= History of the Chagos Archipelago =

History of the Chagos Archipelago in the Indian Ocean

The history of the Chagos Archipelago covers the coral atolls in the central Indian Ocean, about 2,200 kilometres (1,400 mi) north-east of Mauritius, that have formed the British Indian Ocean Territory since 1965. Known to Portuguese navigators and shown on their charts from 1538, the islands had no permanent inhabitants until the late eighteenth century. France claimed them from the 1740s, and planters from Île de France (Mauritius) established coconut plantations there from the 1780s, worked by enslaved people brought mainly from Madagascar and Mozambique. The archipelago was administered as a dependency of Île de France, and it passed to Britain with Mauritius and its other dependencies, first by the capitulation of 1810 and then under the Treaty of Paris of 1814.

For the next 150 years the islands were governed from Port Louis as one of the "Lesser Dependencies" of Mauritius. After the abolition of slavery the freed people stayed on the plantations, which produced coconut oil and later copra for Mauritius, and their descendants, joined by Indian, Mauritian and Seychellois workers, formed a distinct creole-speaking community known as the Ilois, now generally called Chagossians. Mauritius and the United Kingdom have given differing accounts of this period: Mauritius has argued that the archipelago "has always been an integral part of the territory of Mauritius", while the United Kingdom has said that it was administered from Mauritius "purely as a matter of convenience". In 2019 the International Court of Justice found that in 1965 the archipelago "was clearly an integral part of that non-self-governing territory".

In 1965, before Mauritian independence, the United Kingdom detached the archipelago from Mauritius to make it available for a United States military base on Diego Garcia, and between 1967 and 1973 the whole population was prevented from returning or removed to Mauritius and Seychelles. The expulsion was followed by decades of campaigning and litigation by the islanders and by Mauritius's claim to sovereignty, which led to an advisory opinion of the International Court of Justice in 2019 and to a treaty signed in 2025 under which the United Kingdom recognises Mauritian sovereignty over the whole archipelago, including Diego Garcia; as of November 2026 the treaty had not entered into force.

== Geography and names ==
The Chagos Archipelago, with Peros Banhos and the Salomon Islands in the north, the Great Chagos Bank in the centre and Diego Garcia in the south-east

The Chagos Archipelago is a group of coral atolls in the central Indian Ocean, on the Chagos–Laccadive Ridge, a volcanic ridge that continues northwards through the Maldives. The main island of Mauritius lies about 2,200 kilometres (1,400 mi) to the south-west. The archipelago's maritime boundary with the Maldives was delimited in 2023 (see Mauritius–Maldives maritime boundary case).

The Great Chagos Bank, described by the United Kingdom as the world's largest drying coral atoll, has small islands on its rim, including the Eagle Islands and the Three Brothers; Peros Banhos and the Salomon Islands lie to its north, the Egmont Islands to its south, and Diego Garcia, with more than half of the archipelago's land area, to the south-east. Plantations were established on Diego Garcia, Peros Banhos and Salomon, and also on Eagle Island, the Three Brothers and the Egmont group, also called Six Islands.

Eighteenth-century French plan titled Plan de l'Isle et de la Baye de Diego-Gortia. Early maps gave Diego Garcia various names before the present one became fixed in the late 18th century.

The Portuguese knew the archipelago as Chagas, a word that, according to the historian Auguste Toussaint, referred to the wounds of Christ. The origin of the name Diego Garcia is uncertain: the former British Indian Ocean Territory Commissioner Richard Edis mentioned a possible combination of the names of two Portuguese fleet commanders, Diego Lopes and Garcia de Noronha, and an account of a visit by a Spanish navigator named Diego Garcia in 1532, but regarded any explanation as speculation; early maps used other names, such as Don Garzia, and the present name became definitive only in the late 18th century. Mauritius's pleadings attribute the discovery of the archipelago to Diego García de Moguer. Peros Banhos and the Three Brothers (from the Portuguese Tres Irmãos) kept their Portuguese names, while the Salomon Islands, the Egmont Islands and Eagle Island are named after ships that visited them: the French Salomon in 1777, and the British Egmont and Eagle in 1760 and 1772. Boddam Island, in the Salomon group, is named after Rawson Hart Boddam, the Governor of Bombay who ordered a British withdrawal from Diego Garcia in 1786. In the Maldivian language the islands were called Folovahi, which according to Edis means something like "ten islands". In the 19th and early 20th centuries the Chagos and Agaléga were known together as the "Oil Islands", from the coconut oil they produced, and their inhabitants came to call themselves Ilois, "islanders", or Creoles des Iles (see below).

== Early history ==
=== Before European contact ===
The south-western part of the Great Chagos Bank, photographed from space in 1983

According to Edis, the islands may well have been untouched by humans until the modern era. He noted suggestions that the ancestors of the Malagasy may have called there on their way from present-day Indonesia to Madagascar in the early centuries of the Christian era, introducing the coconut, and that Arab sailors who reached the Maldives in the ninth century may have known of islands to the south; the Chinese fleet of Zheng He would also have passed close to the archipelago in 1413–1415. But, he concluded, if any of these voyagers did visit, "we shall never know for they left no mark or record". Citing the limited range of land plants and animals, he suggested that the islands in their present form may have emerged from the sea only a couple of thousand years ago; Diego Garcia has no indigenous mammals.

According to Edis, Dom Manuel, a Christian king of the Maldives (the nearest inhabited islands) installed by the Portuguese in the mid-16th century, laid claim to the Chagos, but two Maldivian attempts to colonise them failed because the settlers could not find the islands. In Edis's account the archipelago remained for a century and a half after 1602 "in a sort of limbo", known to the European powers but rarely visited; David Vine describes it as uninhabited throughout the 17th and early 18th centuries, a refuge and provisioning stop for passing ships. The two governments' accounts agree on this point: Mauritius says the islands remained uninhabited through the Portuguese era, and the British Indian Ocean Territory Administration that they were uninhabited until the late 18th century.

=== Portuguese, Dutch and British navigators (16th–18th centuries) ===
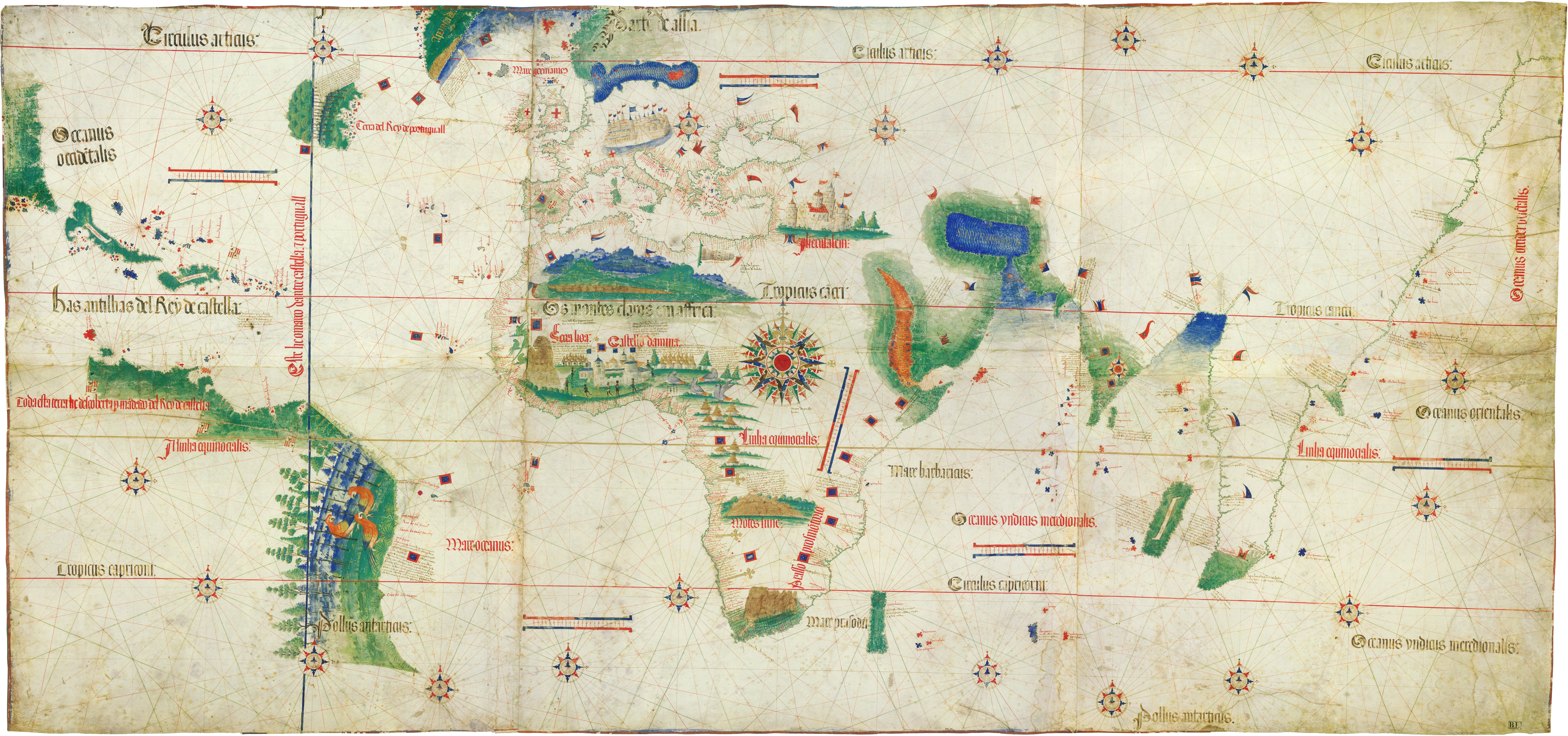
The Cantino planisphere of 1502, on which clusters of islands that probably represent the Chagos appear

Portuguese navigators probably sighted and named the islands in the first two decades of the 16th century, on the route to Goa that Vasco da Gama had opened in 1498; clusters of islands that probably represent the Chagos appear on the Cantino planisphere of 1502, and Edis thought that the discoverer was probably Pedro Mascarenhas. In the account accepted by both parties in the 2015 arbitration, the archipelago appeared on Portuguese charts as early as 1538 but "remained largely untouched". Off the main route to India and ringed with dangerous reefs, it was avoided rather than used as a way station, and more than two centuries passed before its position was reasonably fixed. The Portuguese ship Conceição ran aground on Peros Banhos on 22 August 1555 on her way to India; the main account of the wreck is that of a passenger, Manoel Rangel, and according to Edis the officers took the only undamaged boat and left some 350 people behind, of whom about 50 eventually reached India.

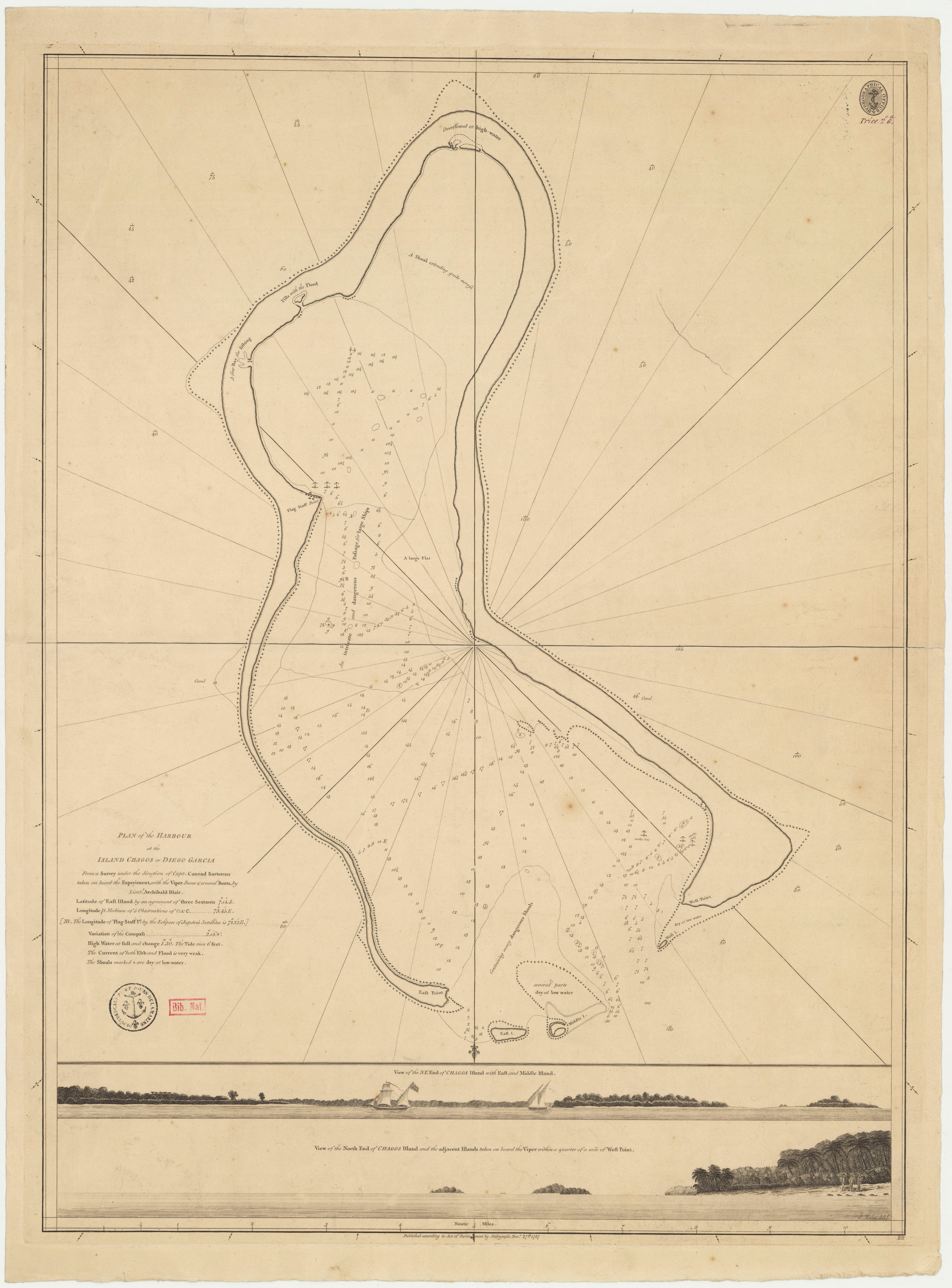
Chart of Diego Garcia from a survey by Lieutenant Archibald Blair, published in 1787

English, Dutch and French ships followed the Portuguese into the Indian Ocean from the late 16th century, and in 1602 an English fleet under James Lancaster was trapped for several days within the reefs of the Great Chagos Bank. Mauritius states that while the Dutch occupied Mauritius, from 1638 to 1710, the archipelago was rarely visited by Europeans; a Dutch captain, van Keulen, reported the position of Diego Garcia in 1744. British ships called at the archipelago from 1719, and from the 1760s ships from British India surveyed several of its atolls and banks.

As Anglo-French rivalry in the Indian Ocean grew, the hydrographer of the East India Company, Alexander Dalrymple, ordered a survey of the islands between the Maldives and Madagascar, and in 1786 the company's Bombay government sent an expedition to set up a victualling station on Diego Garcia. Entering the lagoon on 27 April, it found an establishment of a Monsieur Le Normand, described as "a dozen huts of the meanest appearance"; disregarding it, the British took formal possession of Diego Garcia and its dependencies for George III and the company on 4 May. The planting failed, the company's directors objected to the cost, and the French Governor of Île de France, the Vicomte de Souillac, protested to Bombay; the Bombay Council under Governor Boddam decided to withdraw, and the settlers left in October 1786. A French frigate sent to expel them arrived after they had gone; Magon de Médine formally reasserted the French claim, and a stone marker proclaiming French sovereignty was put up. Lieutenant Archibald Blair, who surveyed Diego Garcia in May 1786 and stayed to survey the rest of the archipelago, produced a map of the atoll that Edis considered highly accurate.

== French colonial period (1770s–1810) ==
=== French claims and the first settlement ===
French plan of Peros Banhos, titled Plan des isles de Chagas, from the voyage of Lazare Picault in the Élisabeth in 1744

France took possession of Mauritius in 1715 as Île de France, and from the 1740s its ships systematically explored the islands to the north. Lazare Picault visited Peros Banhos in the Élisabeth in 1744, the year in which France is said to have claimed that atoll; in September 1769 two French ships surveyed Diego Garcia, and in 1770 La Fontaine made the first survey of its lagoon. Mauritius dates the French claim to Diego Garcia to 1769. Concessions for coconut plantations granted by the French authorities on Île de France followed, "leading to permanent settlement".

Accounts differ on when settlement began. A grant of Diego Garcia to a Monsieur Dupuit de la Faye in 1778 is recorded. Mauritius's pleadings and Vine date permanent settlement to a concession that Pierre Marie Le Normand, a planter on Île de France, obtained in February 1783; the Mauritian historian Satyendra Peerthum, citing the National Archives of Mauritius, adds that Le Normand sailed for Diego Garcia in 1784. Mauritius's Memorial also suggests that the first slave colony was probably on Peros Banhos. Edis and the geographer D. R. Stoddart instead place the coconut concessions, Le Normand's among them, in the late 1780s, after the British episode; Stoddart wrote that the French had not tried to settle before 1786, and Edis that it is unclear whether the first concessions involved permanent establishments. The British Indian Ocean Territory Administration dates the first French copra plantations to 1793, when Lapotaire, of Port Louis, was allowed to set up a factory on Diego Garcia to export copra and coconut oil rather than whole nuts.

French plan of Diego Garcia by La Fontaine, capitaine de brûlot, 1770, the year in which he made the first survey of the atoll's lagoon

Other planters from Île de France, among them the brothers Cayeux, Dauguet and Didier, set up plantations and a fishing settlement on Diego Garcia in the 1790s and 1800s, encouraged by the rise in the price of oil caused by the British blockade of Île de France. In 1809 the Captain-General, Decaen, allotted the east of the atoll to newcomers and banned oil-making there, fearing that it would attract British raids. Plantations were opened on Six Islands in 1808 and, after the British conquest, on Peros Banhos, the Three Brothers, Eagle Island and the Salomon Islands in 1813. People with leprosy were also sent from Île de France to Diego Garcia, apparently in the belief that turtle meat could cure them, and accepting them was a condition of the 1809 concessions; according to Peerthum, the French and then the British authorities sent them there by force until 1828.

France administered the archipelago, like Seychelles, as a dependency of Île de France. The two governments later differed over what that meant: Mauritius told the 2015 tribunal that throughout French rule, from 1715 to 1810, the archipelago "was administered as part of Mauritius". The United Kingdom replied that no authority was cited for this, that on Mauritius's own account France claimed Diego Garcia only in 1769, and that "if one entity is administered as part of another, that does not mean that it forms part of the latter's territory".

=== Enslaved people and the origins of the population ===
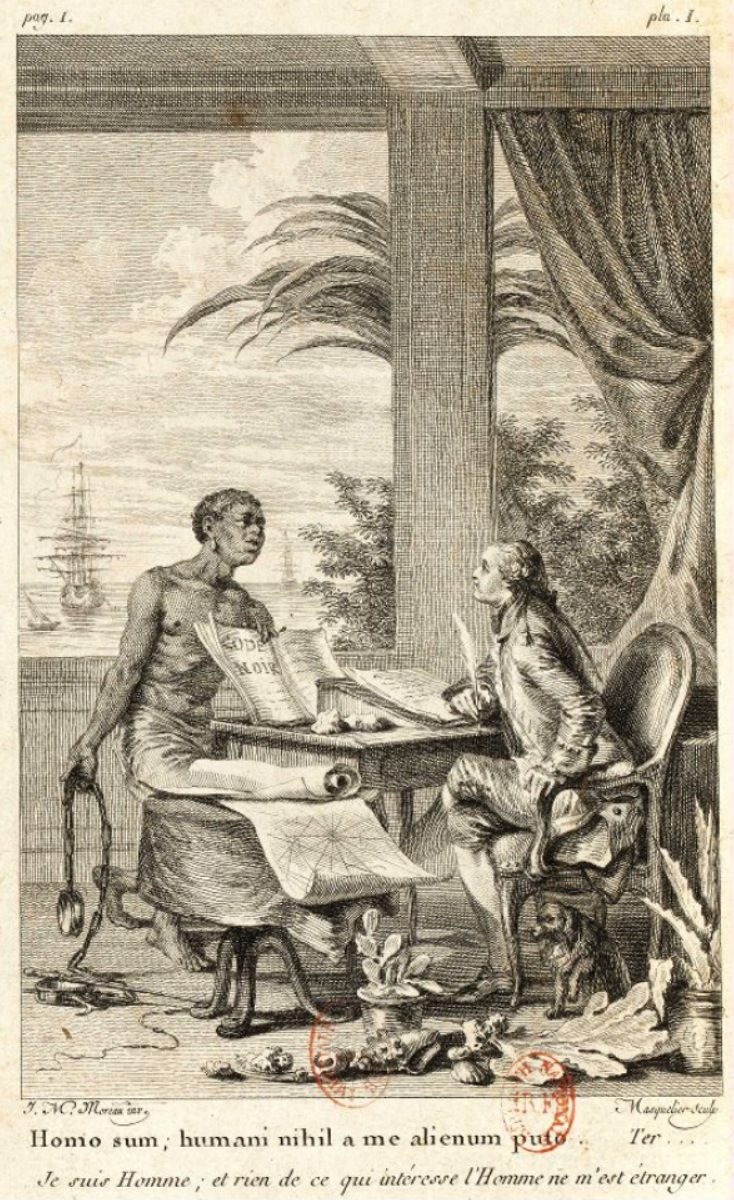
Frontispiece by Jean-Michel Moreau for Bernardin de Saint-Pierre's Voyage à l'Isle de France (1773)

French settlers on Île de France had built a society on enslaved labour, for which the French Company of the Indies developed a slave trade from Madagascar and Mozambique; most of the people enslaved on the Chagos came from these two regions, to work on coconut plantations established by Franco-Mauritians. Most arrived through Mauritius, though some may have come through Seychelles, or directly from Madagascar and the African mainland in an illegal trade that took advantage of the islands' isolation.

Vine wrote that the archipelago's first permanent inhabitants were probably 22 enslaved Africans brought to Diego Garcia by Le Normand around 1783, some of whose descendants are likely to be among today's Chagossians; Mauritius adopted this account in its 2012 Memorial. Peerthum's account, from the Mauritian archives, is that Le Normand sailed in 1784 with two ships carrying 79 enslaved Mozambicans and Malagasies and a few free people of colour who were skilled workers. By 1808 about 100 enslaved people worked for Lapotaire alone, and a similar number worked at Peros Banhos by 1813. The plantations were held under indefinite leases by a small number of proprietors living in Mauritius.

Edis wrote that contemporary accounts do not suggest that the overseers actively mistreated the enslaved workers, and that their tasks of gathering and preparing coconuts were relatively light, with rations of rice and rum that they could supplement with what they could catch or raise themselves. Vine, by contrast, sets planters' descriptions of their workforce as "happy and content" against a working day "from sunrise to sunset for six days a week", and notes that the small garden plots (petites plantations) allowed to enslaved workers were the beginnings of Chagossian land tenure. According to Edis, they would soon have adopted Creole, a French-based language, as their common tongue.

Returns for 1826, under British rule, recorded 377 enslaved people in the archipelago (269 men and 108 women), 9 white and 22 free inhabitants; Diego Garcia had 275 inhabitants, including 218 enslaved people and 37 people with leprosy. Peerthum gives a total for 1826 of 448 inhabitants, including 42 people with leprosy. Slavery remained the defining feature of life on the islands until its abolition in the 1830s, and the descendants of the enslaved came to form the community of islanders known as the Ilois (see below).

=== Capture by Britain (1810) and the Treaty of Paris (1814) ===
French chart entitled Carte de l'archipel au Nord de l'Isle de France, covering Seychelles, the Amirantes, the Chagos and the Maldives, drawn up by the Chevalier Grenier in 1776

During the Napoleonic Wars a British force from India captured Rodrigues, Réunion and finally Île de France, which capitulated on 3 December 1810; the capitulation covered its dependencies, including the Chagos. The island, renamed Mauritius, remained under British military occupation until the Treaty of Paris of 30 May 1814. By Article VIII Britain undertook to return the colonies France had held on 1 January 1792, except for some, including "the Isle of France and its Dependencies, especially Rodrigue and les Séchelles", which France ceded "in full right and Sovereignty". French law continued to apply in Mauritius and its dependencies.

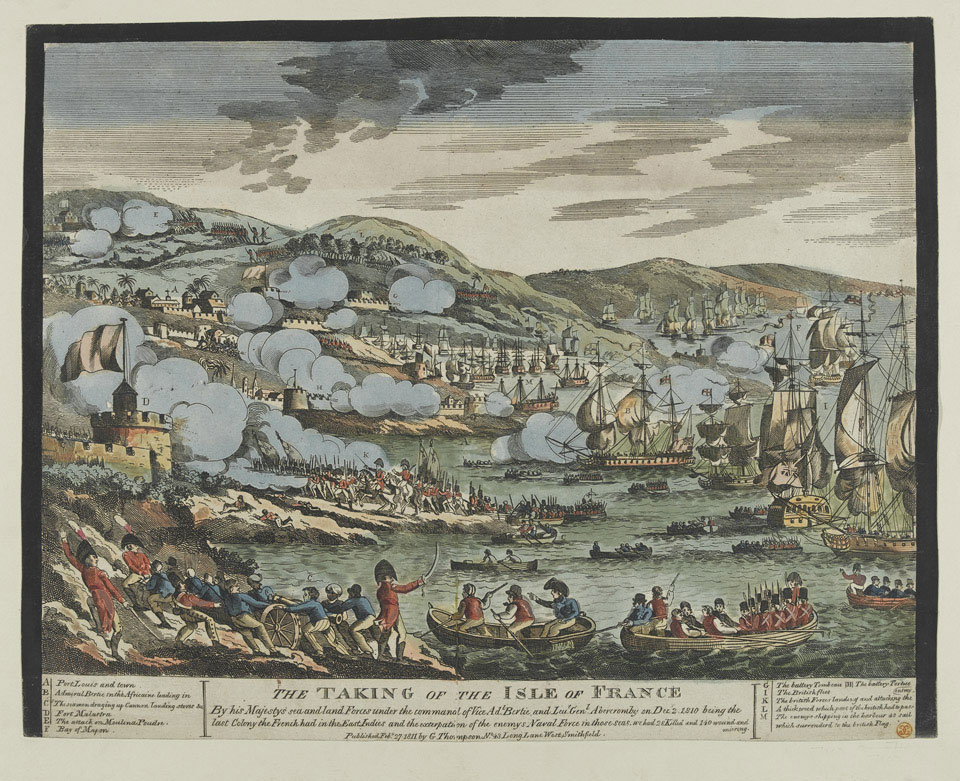
The taking of the Isle of France (Mauritius), 2 December 1810, a print published by G. Thompson in 1811

Both governments accept that the Chagos were among the dependencies ceded in 1814, and the arbitral tribunal recorded that "[t]hese early historical events are not in dispute between the Parties". They differ, however, on what the cession signified: Mauritius argues that the treaty "clearly recognised the Chagos Archipelago as part of the territory of Mauritius", and points out that Rodrigues, also named as a dependency in Article VIII, remained part of Mauritius at independence. The United Kingdom's position is that the islands "were never an integral part of Mauritius, but were among its Dependencies", and that the treaty, which speaks only of the Isle of France and its dependencies, "did no such thing". Mauritius said that its account of the early history "stands unchallenged"; the United Kingdom answered that points it had not contested were not thereby accepted but were "simply irrelevant" to the islands' territorial status. The International Court of Justice recorded in 2019 that by the treaty France ceded Mauritius "and all its dependencies" to the United Kingdom, and English courts have treated the territory as part of a colony acquired by cession in 1814.

== Dependency of Mauritius (1814–1965) ==
=== Administration from Port Louis ===
After the British captured Isle de France in 1810 and renamed it Mauritius, France ceded the island and all its dependencies, including the Chagos Archipelago, to the United Kingdom by the Treaty of Paris of 30 May 1814. From then until 8 November 1965 the United Kingdom administered the archipelago as a dependency of the colony of Mauritius. Governor Sir Lowry Cole listed Diego Garcia, the Six Islands, the Three Brothers, Salomon and Peros Banhos among the dependencies of Mauritius in 1826, and ordinances of 1852 and 1872 described the islands in the same way. In the nineteenth and early twentieth centuries the Chagos and the island of Agaléga were known as the "Oil Islands" from the coconut oil they produced, and with St. Brandon they formed the "Lesser Dependencies" of Mauritius, as distinct from the larger dependency of Rodrigues.

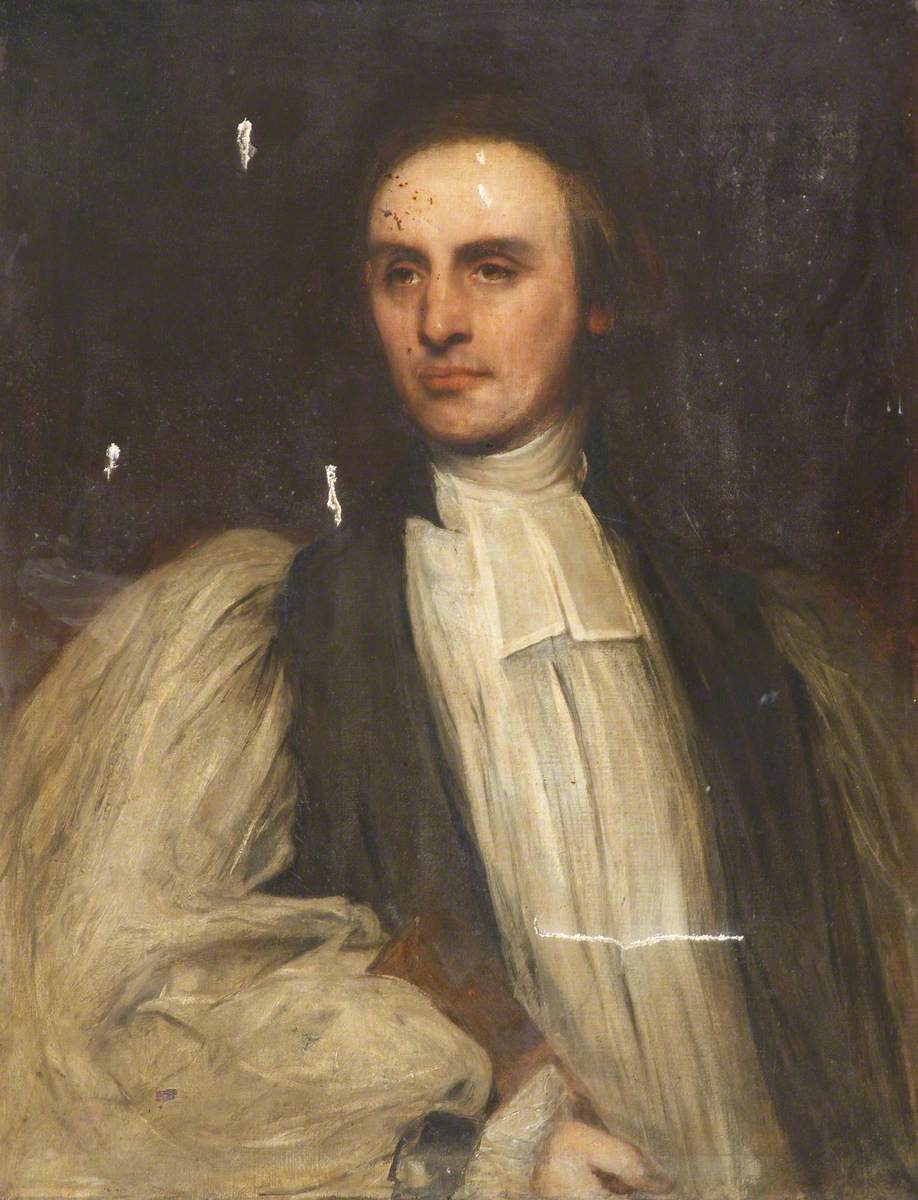
Vincent Ryan, Anglican Bishop of Mauritius, who sailed with the commissioners sent to the island dependencies in 1859

Ordinances of 1852 and 1853 empowered the Governor, and then the Governor in Executive Council, "to extend to the Seychelles Islands and other Dependencies of Mauritius any laws and regulations published in this Colony", adapted to local circumstances. The first British official on Diego Garcia was appointed in 1824, after unrest among the planters, the slaves and the lepers who were still being sent there. For a quarter of a century after emancipation, Edis writes, the concession-holders, all absentees in Mauritius, ran the islands largely as private estates. In 1859 the Mauritius government sent two commissioners to report on conditions in the island dependencies; Vincent Ryan, the Anglican Bishop of Mauritius, who sailed with them, recorded that their task was to inquire into the workers' state, treatment and wages.

A district magistrate was appointed for the islands in 1864, and an ordinance of 1872 made the Junior District Magistrate of Port Louis the district magistrate for the islands, with the same jurisdiction as if they formed part of the district of Port Louis. Ordinance No. 41 of 1875 created a police and stipendiary magistrate for "the smaller Dependencies commonly called 'Oil Islands'", who was to visit them to administer justice and report to the Governor, and provided for permanent officers of the civil status. The plantation managers were appointed both as peace officers, with limited criminal jurisdiction and police powers, and as civil status officers, who recorded births, marriages and deaths and notified them to the Registrar General of Mauritius.

Government House and a view of Port Louis from the Citadel, photographed between 1880 and 1899

Regular magistrates' tours began in 1875. Visiting officials were instructed to make sure that nobody was held on the islands against their will or treated with cruelty; on the first tour E. P. Brooks fined an under-manager at Pointe Marianne for striking a labourer and the manager of East Point for imprisoning three labourers without sufficient cause. The Lesser Dependencies Ordinance of 1904 provided for district and stipendiary magistrates for the islands, each of which was to be visited, as far as possible, at least once a year; from 1945, under the Courts Ordinance, magistrates were appointed as "Magistrates for Mauritius and the Dependencies". Reviewing the evidence in 2003, Mr Justice Ouseley found that "visits by Mauritian officials were rare and the Magistrate was at best an annual visitor", which left the plantation managers in day-to-day charge.

In 1903 Seychelles, which had also been a dependency of Mauritius, became a separate colony; Coëtivy and Farquhar were transferred to it in 1908 and 1921, after which the Lesser Dependencies of Mauritius consisted of the Chagos Archipelago, Agaléga and St Brandon. Letters Patent of 1885 defined the colony as "the Island of Mauritius and its Dependencies", and the Mauritius (Constitution) Order 1964 defined it as "the island of Mauritius and the Dependencies of Mauritius".

=== Slavery, apprenticeship and emancipation ===
In a proclamation of 1815 the first British Governor of Mauritius, Sir Robert Farquhar, declared that the Acts of Parliament abolishing the slave trade "extend to every, even the most remote and minute portion" of the Crown's possessions and dependencies. Slavery was abolished in Mauritius and its dependencies under the Slavery Abolition Act 1833, after which the former slaves were apprenticed to their former owners for a transitional period; Edis dates abolition to August 1834 and final emancipation to 1840, while Vine dates abolition to 1835, followed by about four years of apprenticeship. George Harrison, an Assistant Protector of Slaves, visited the Chagos in 1835 to supervise emancipation, and Special Justice Charles Anderson followed in 1838. Anderson found conditions for the 135 apprentices on Diego Garcia "decidedly inferior to those of labourers on the other islands I have visited" and ordered their daily tasks reduced, but the Governor, citing the islands' remoteness, declined to impose the full penalties on the owners. Owners were compensated through the Mauritius claims under the Act: one claim relating to 28 enslaved people, lodged by an owner on Diego Garcia, was awarded £865 6s 9d, all of which went to creditors who had made counterclaims.

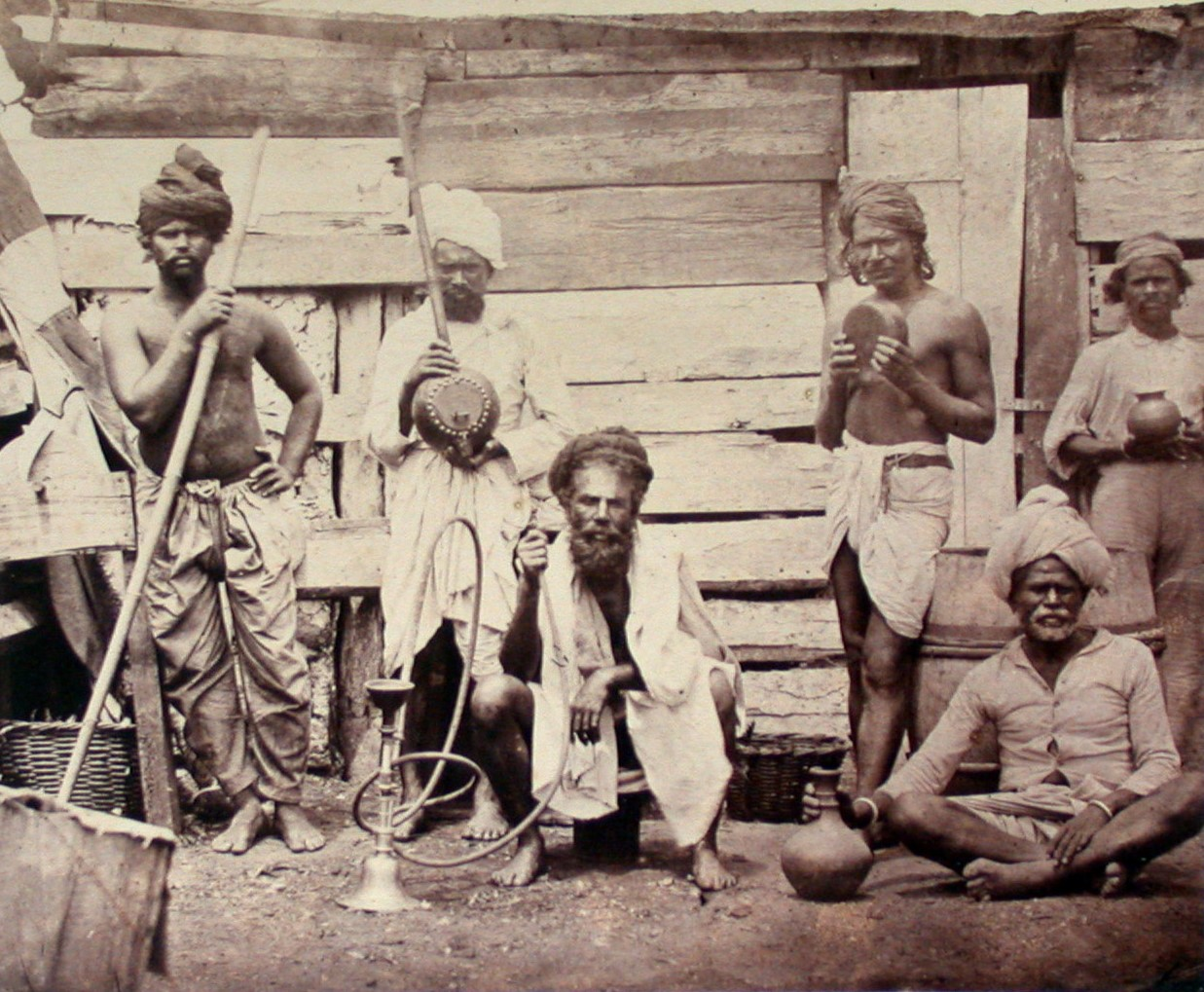
Indian indentured labourers on a sugar estate in Mauritius, 1870. Indentured labourers were also brought to the Chagos, but in relatively small numbers.

Because freed slaves were entitled to remain in the colony where they had been freed, many continued to work on the plantations. Edis writes that after emancipation the labourers worked under contracts for wages but that life otherwise continued much as before; the historian Charles Pridham remarked in 1845 that the slaves on the Chagos were "now free, that is to say nominally". Unlike Mauritius, where planters turned to indentured labour from India after emancipation, the archipelago saw no large-scale departure of freed slaves; Indian indentured labourers were also brought to the islands, but in relatively small numbers. There was periodic labour protest: in 1856 four workers who had been "kidnapped from Cochin" rose up and killed the manager of the Six Islands. Further labour was recruited from Mauritius, Madagascar and Mozambique, Mauritian labourers being employed in theory on contracts of one or two years renewable before the visiting magistrate. Recruits from Mauritius who stayed on married into the families of the descendants of slaves, and after the Second World War labourers were also recruited from Seychelles; those born in the islands came to be known as the Ilois, and now generally call themselves Chagossians.

=== Plantation economy ===
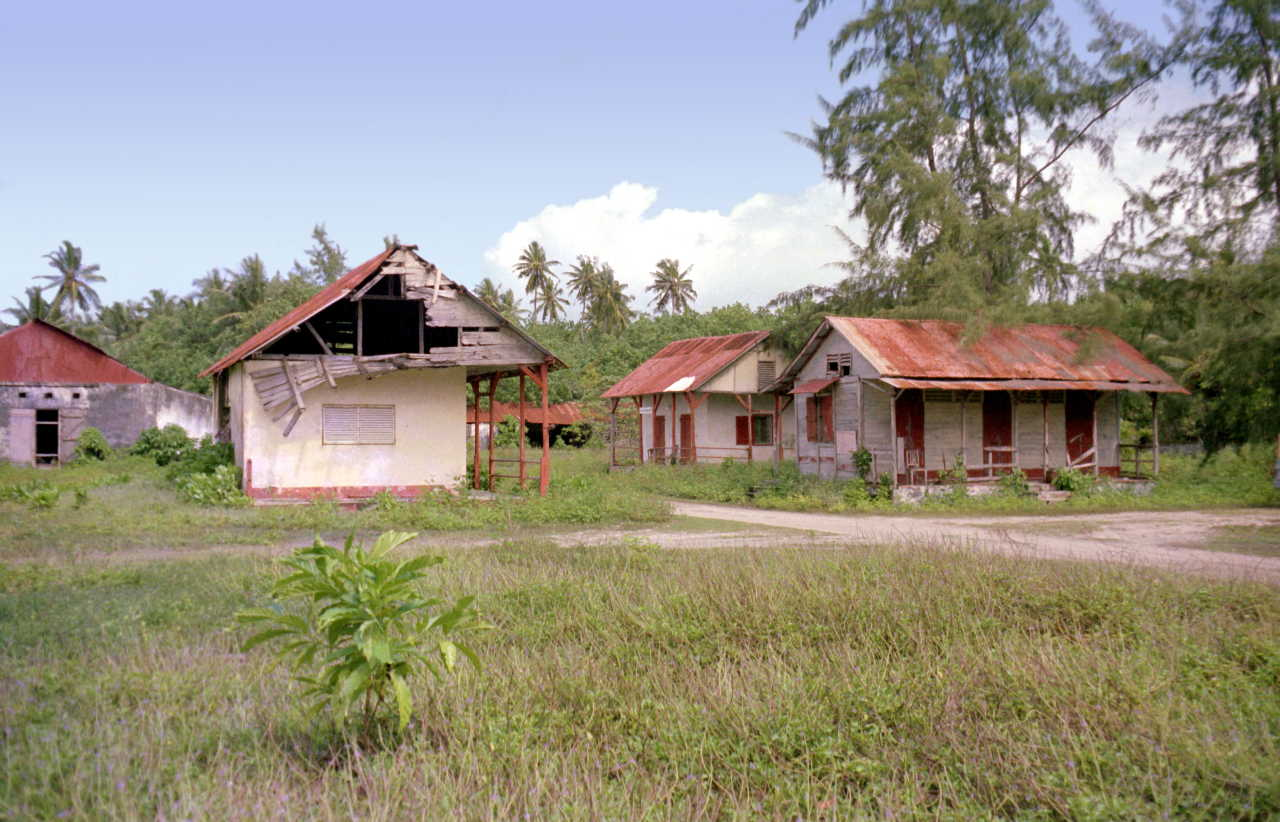
Former plantation buildings on Diego Garcia, photographed in 1982

The plantations were held as concessions (jouissances) by owners who lived in Mauritius; the estates were run by managers, usually white Mauritians, assisted by overseers known as commandeurs. In 1865 the government offered the concession-holders freeholds in perpetuity for a payment of two shillings per velte of oil produced, based on the output of 1864, and nearly all of them bought their freeholds. In 1864 Diego Garcia's three estates, East Point, Pointe Marianne and Minni Minni, were assessed as producing some 99,000 gallons of coconut oil a year. In 1883 they were merged into the Société Huilière de Diégo et Péros, which ran them, together with the plantations of the outer islands, until 1962.

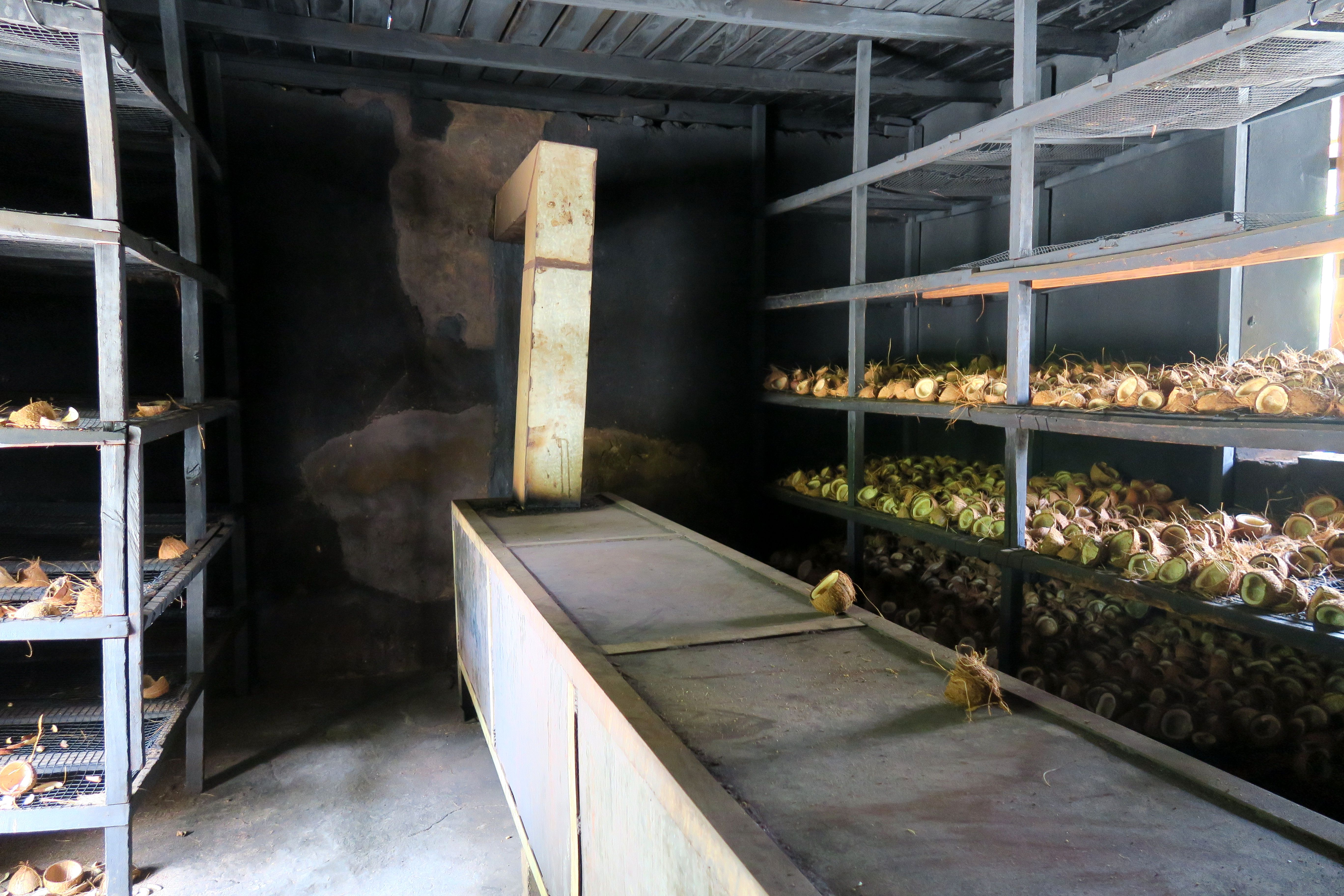
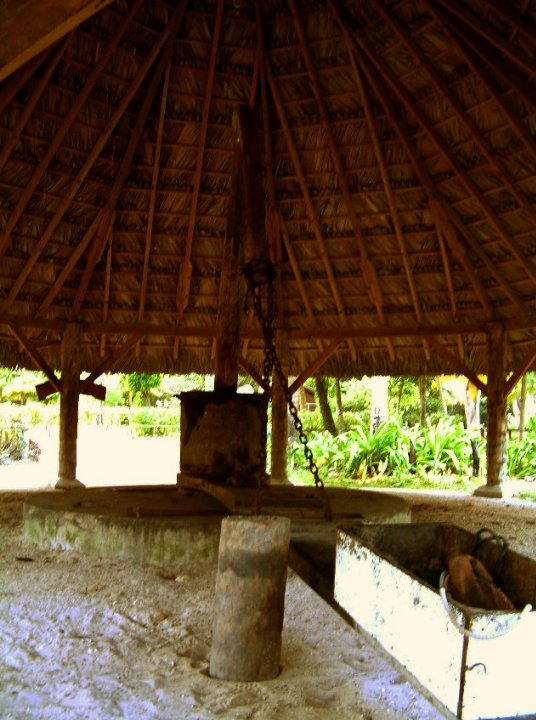
Copra drying in a kiln (left, 2018) and copra oil mills (right, 2004) on La Digue, Seychelles. On the Chagos plantations the dried kernels, or copra, were ground in donkey-driven mills.

Men gathered and husked a daily quota of coconuts, women broke the nuts and extracted the kernels, and the dried kernels, or copra, were ground in donkey-driven mills. The naturalist Gilbert Bourne reported in the 1880s that "All the oil is exported to Mauritius by the oil company's ship, which calls three times a year at Diego Garcia." In the early twentieth century, as oil fell out of use for lighting and more efficient methods of drying copra were introduced, copra replaced oil as the main product; by about 1910 it was the main coconut product exported from the islands to Mauritius, where the oil was extracted. The islands also produced timber, honey, pigs, salt fish, wooden boats and guano; guano for the sugar fields of Mauritius made up a third of Diego Garcia's exports by 1957.

According to Vine, labourers earned about 10 shillings a month around 1860, plus a weekly ration of rice counted as part of their wages. By the 1960s men harvesting coconuts earned about £2 a month and the women who shelled them less than half that, with rations, holidays with free passage to Mauritius, free health care and pensions on retirement. Ouseley J described the companies as running the islands "in a somewhat feudal manner"; wages were very low, but the companies provided rations, a dispensary, basic medical attention, limited schooling and a priest.

In the twentieth century the main plantations belonged to two closely associated Mauritian companies, Diego Garcia Ltd and Agalega Ltd, which also ran a ship to the islands and a factory in Port Louis that made refined oil and soap. In financial difficulty, they sold the islands in 1962 for Rs 1.5 million to Chagos Agalega Ltd, a company formed in Seychelles whose largest shareholders were the Colonial Steamship Company of Mauritius and the Seychelles businessman Paul Moulinié. The population of the archipelago was about 760 in 1880 and approached 1,000 by 1900. Outlying islands were abandoned as production was concentrated: the Three Brothers in the 1850s, and Eagle Island and the Egmont Islands in the 1930s.

=== Coaling station, surveys and the world wars ===
Admiralty chart of the Chagos Archipelago from the 1837 survey by Commander Robert Moresby and Lieutenant F. T. Powell, published in 1839 and corrected to 1906

In 1837 Commander Robert Moresby of the Indian Navy made the first full hydrographic survey of Diego Garcia; his charts remained in use for a century, and he planted breadfruit trees brought from Ceylon. The opening of the Suez Canal in 1869 and the spread of steamships made the atoll, on the route between the Red Sea and Australia, attractive as a coaling station. In 1882 the Orient Steam Navigation Company moved its coaling station for the Australian run from Aden to Diego Garcia, and the London firm of Lund and Company also set up there; in the second half of 1883, 34 large steamers and two Royal Navy warships coaled at the atoll. The need for safe navigation by ships calling to coal led to a survey of the lagoon by HMS Rambler in 1885.

Imported labourers, visiting crews and passengers brought disorder, and a magistrate from Mauritius reported that he had no means of enforcing his judgments. A police post was set up at Minni Minni in 1885, but it was withdrawn in 1888 after disputes between the Mauritius government and London over its cost. The coaling business proved unprofitable as ships gained range, the Orient company left in 1888, and by 1900 Diego Garcia was again simply a supplier of coconut products.

In October 1914, early in the First World War, the German cruiser SMS Emden put in at Diego Garcia to take on coal and clean her hull. The islanders had not heard that war had broken out; one of the ship's officers, Hellmuth von Mücke, wrote that the crew learned from a visitor that "Diego Garcia receives a mail only twice a year, by way of Mauritius". The Emden was destroyed at the Cocos (Keeling) Islands on 9 November 1914.

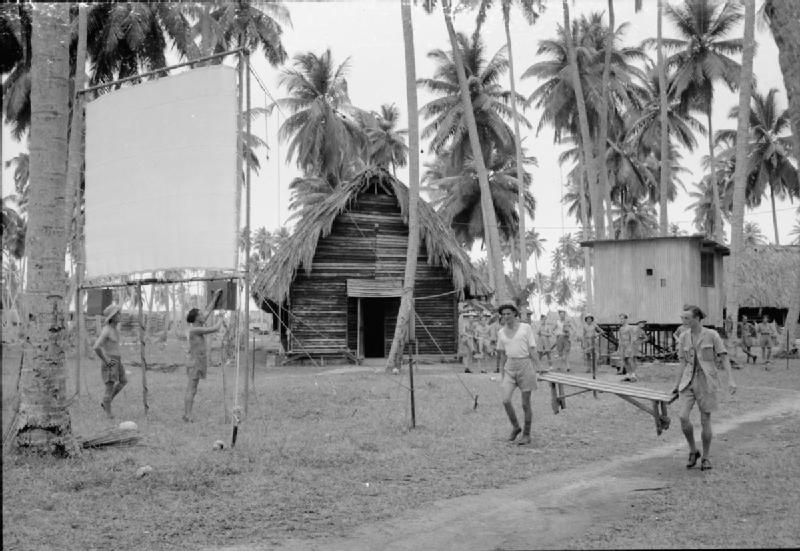
Royal Air Force personnel building an open-air cinema at the RAF base on Diego Garcia during the Second World War

After the Japanese attack on Colombo in April 1942, Diego Garcia became one of several fuelling and minor operational bases for naval craft and flying boats, defended by six-inch guns. According to the territory's administration, an RAF station with an advanced flying-boat unit was opened at East Point in 1942, and two six-inch naval guns at Cannon Point were manned by Mauritian and Indian troops; nine members of these units are buried in a Commonwealth war graves cemetery at Pointe Marianne. The Catholic priest Roger Dussercle ministered to the garrison and conducted the funerals of soldiers buried there. The military interest was short-lived, and the installations had fallen into decay by 1948.

=== Twentieth-century society and links with Mauritius ===
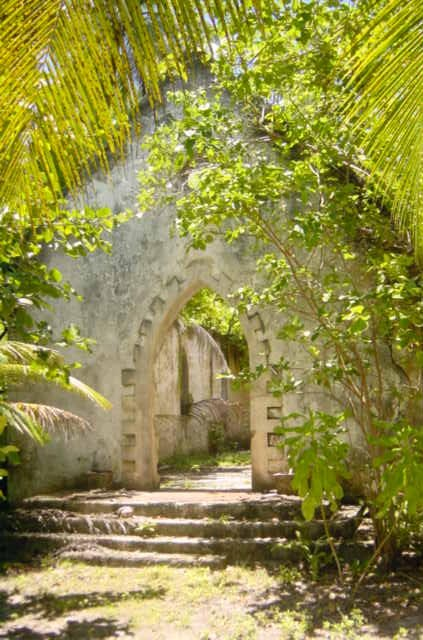
The abandoned church on Boddam Island, Salomon Atoll, in 2008

In 1935, according to Vine, new owners established the first regular steamship connection between Mauritius and the Chagos. The ship, run by the companies' agent with a subsidy from the Mauritius government, brought rations and supplies and carried workers going on leave or needing medical treatment; expectant mothers often went to Mauritius to give birth. By the mid-twentieth century wireless at the meteorological stations, which were important for cyclone warnings, linked the main islands with Mauritius and Seychelles.

The colonial government in Mauritius took a growing interest in the islanders' welfare: specialists investigated health and agricultural conditions, and nurseries, schools and a refuse-collection service were set up. In 1964 the Colonial Office official Robert Newton recorded that magistrates from Mauritius inspected the islands about once a year and that the Mauritius government maintained meteorological stations on Diego Garcia and Agaléga and supplied schoolteachers, midwives and dispensers, but he described the administrative connection with Mauritius as tenuous and administration in any practical sense as left to the managers.

Religious ministry also came from Mauritius: Bishop Ryan toured the islands with the 1859 commissioners, and Catholic priests visited in 1875 and 1884. A chapel was built at East Point in 1895, followed by a church there and chapels on other islands, and most islanders came to regard themselves as Roman Catholic. From 1933 the Archbishop of Port Louis sent a French priest, Roger Dussercle, who visited repeatedly until and during the Second World War; he found that about 60 per cent of Diego Garcia's people had been born in the islands and that they spoke a Creole similar to that of Mauritius. After a strike by workers on Peros Banhos in August 1931, a magistrate and police officers were sent from Mauritius; an attempt by a manager on Salomon to ban the séga dance in 1937 led to an insurrection.

The Governor of Mauritius, Sir Robert Scott, toured the islands in 1955 and described them in his book Limuria (1961). Low wages, monotonous work, a lack of facilities and the great distance to Mauritius and Seychelles discouraged recruitment, and the islands' population fell from about 1,100 in the early 1950s to 747 in 1962. Diego Garcia's population halved between 1952 and 1962, labour had to be brought in from Seychelles, and by the mid-1960s imported workers outnumbered those born on the atoll by two to one. Scott described a "drift" of islanders to Mauritius, drawn by its shops, cinemas and football matches, while the new owners after 1962 relied increasingly on single male labourers from Seychelles. The Anglo-American survey of 1964 counted 993 people in the archipelago, 483 of them on Diego Garcia, and the British government told Parliament in November 1965 that the population was approximately 1,000. On 8 November 1965 the archipelago was separated from Mauritius by Order in Council to form part of the British Indian Ocean Territory (see Detachment of the Chagos Archipelago).

== Relationship with Mauritius ==
The islands of the Republic of Mauritius and the Chagos Archipelago, which Mauritius claims

=== Historical ties ===
The archipelago's association with Mauritius dates from the French period, when France administered it as a dependency of Isle de France, and the United Kingdom continued that arrangement from 1814 until 1965; neither the early history nor the broad outlines of British administration are disputed between the two states. Throughout that time magistrates and, on occasion, police were sent from Mauritius, births, marriages and deaths were notified to its Registrar General, the plantation owners lived there and their managers were usually Mauritians, and the islands' oil and copra were shipped to Mauritius. The geographer David Stoddart wrote in 1971 that Diego Garcia had "simply been used as a supplier of coconut products, and to a lesser extent of dried fish and turtles, for Mauritius". Families were linked through migration: recruits from Mauritius married into island families, children left for Mauritius where they had relatives, and islanders went there for leave, medical care and childbirth. The islands also had ties with Seychelles, especially in the twentieth century, through Seychellois labour and the Seychelles-based owners of 1962; Newton reported in 1964 that, in so far as the islands had a distinctive social and economic life, it was Seychellois rather than Mauritian. When Mauritius became independent on 12 March 1968, its constitution conferred Mauritian citizenship on people born in the part of the territory that had been detached from Mauritius, except those whose fathers were born in Seychelles.

=== Mauritius's account ===
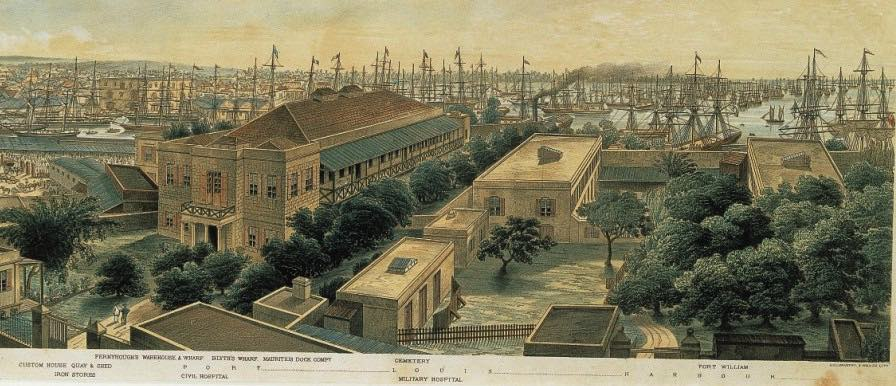
Western Port Louis, the capital of Mauritius, in 1859, by Frederick Fiebig. The United Kingdom administered the archipelago as a dependency of the colony of Mauritius from 1814 until 1965.

Before the arbitral tribunal and the International Court of Justice, Mauritius argued that the archipelago "has always been an integral part of the territory of Mauritius". Its Memorial stated that the administration of the archipelago "as a constituent part of Mauritius continued without interruption throughout that period of British rule". It relied on three kinds of evidence: the constitutional, legislative and administrative arrangements, from the 1826 list and the ordinances of 1852 to 1945 to the constitutions that defined Mauritius as including its dependencies; what it called the "close economic, cultural and social links between Mauritius and the Chagos Archipelago", including owners and managers from Mauritius, copra shipped there free of duty, free passage for workers and a shared Creole; and British conduct before and after 1965, such as official statements in 1965 that the islands were legally part of the colony, the compensation and the undertaking to return the archipelago. It called the British case "unhappily formalistic", and argued that if the link had been one of mere administrative convenience there would have been no need to provide for the islanders to become Mauritian citizens at independence. Before the Court it argued that the label of "Dependency" could not be decisive—"What counts is substance, not form"—since Rodrigues, Agaléga and St Brandon, also dependencies, had remained part of Mauritius at independence. It also cited a 1980 Foreign Office research note which observed that, had the islands not been detached, "they would presumably have done the same" as Agaléga and St Brandon.

=== United Kingdom's account ===
The United Kingdom accepts that the archipelago was administered from Mauritius as a dependency from 1814 to 1965, but denies that it was an integral part of Mauritius. In its Counter-Memorial and its Written Statement to the ICJ it said that the islands were administered "purely as a matter of convenience" as a dependency of Mauritius, that they were "very loosely administered from Mauritius", and that contact was minimal because of the distance of some 2,150 kilometres; the Counter-Memorial added that they "had no economic relevance to Mauritius, other than as a supplier of coconut oil and an employer of a limited number of contract labourers". Citing colonial practice elsewhere, it argued that dependencies "could be, and often were, detached or attached as between one colony and another by exercise of the Royal Prerogative". In its view the legislation showed the islands to be "in law and in fact quite distinct from the Island of Mauritius": Mauritian laws reached them only by express provision, the islands' magistrate held a separate office even when the same person also sat in Port Louis, and no part of the archipelago lay in a Mauritian electoral constituency. It noted that the statutory definition of "Mauritius" was amended to name the archipelago only in 1982. It argued that "if one entity is administered as part of another, that does not mean that it forms part of the latter's territory", and that social ties were irrelevant: "Many places have close cultural and social ties, but this does not mean they come under the same territorial sovereignty." Before the ICJ it described the connection as "loose and remote", said that the islands had been "remote in terms of social, cultural, political and legal connections with Mauritius", and cited a later description by Seewoosagur Ramgoolam, the Mauritian Premier in 1965, of islands "virtually unknown to most Mauritians".

=== Findings of courts and tribunals ===
The Peace Palace in The Hague, seat of the International Court of Justice, which gave its advisory opinion on the separation of the archipelago in 2019

The arbitral tribunal in Mauritius v United Kingdom (2015) recorded that "the broad outlines of British Administration of the colony during this period are not in dispute", but that the parties disagreed "as to the extent of economic activity in the Chagos Archipelago and its significance for Mauritius, and on the significance of the Archipelago's status as a dependency". By three votes to two it held that it lacked jurisdiction over what it characterised as a dispute about land sovereignty. Judges James Kateka and Rüdiger Wolfrum, dissenting on that point, concluded that the archipelago "was more closely linked to Mauritius than is conceded by the United Kingdom". In its 2019 advisory opinion the International Court of Justice recalled that after 1814 "the island of Mauritius and the Dependencies of Mauritius", including the Chagos Archipelago, had been administered by the United Kingdom without interruption and listed as a non-self-governing territory, and concluded that "at the time of its detachment from Mauritius in 1965, the Chagos Archipelago was clearly an integral part of that non-self-governing territory". Judges in the United Kingdom have also described the relationship: in 2008 Lord Hoffmann said that the islands were "a dependency of Mauritius when it was ceded to the United Kingdom by France in 1814 and until 1965 were administered as part of that colony"; the United Kingdom argued that he had not said that they were part of the territory of Mauritius, while Mauritius pointed to his remark later in the same judgment that "the territory of BIOT was, until the creation of the colony in 1965, part of Mauritius". In 2016 Lord Kerr, dissenting in the Supreme Court, wrote that "Since the early 19th century they had been part of the British colony of Mauritius", and in Chagos Islanders v United Kingdom (2012) the European Court of Human Rights noted that until 8 November 1965 the archipelago had been part of the colony of Mauritius to which the European Convention on Human Rights had been extended.

== The Chagossian people ==
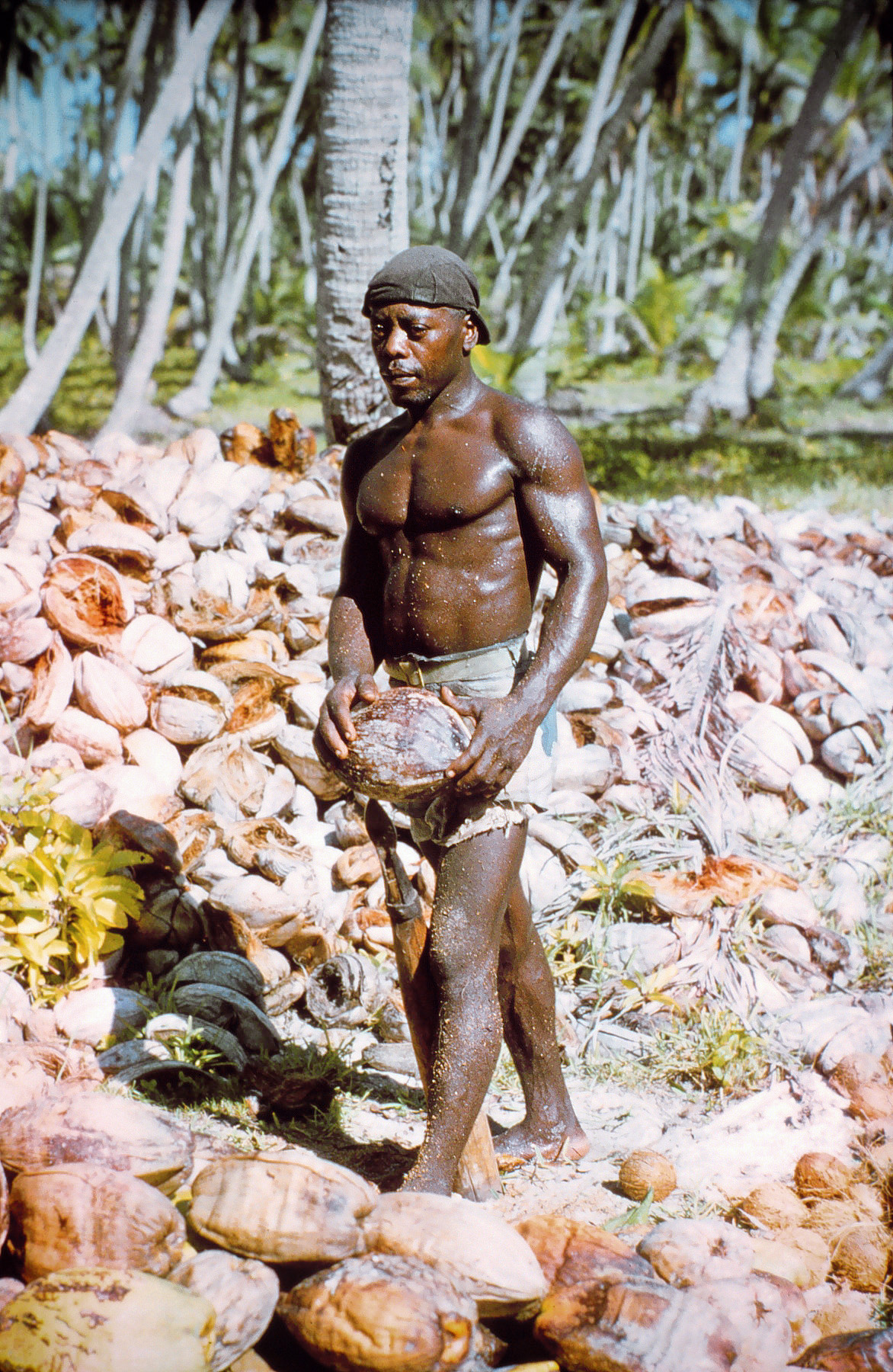
An inhabitant of Diego Garcia in 1971, at the time of the US encampment

The Chagossians are descended mainly from the enslaved Africans and Malagasy brought to the archipelago's coconut plantations from the 1780s, most of whom arrived through Mauritius, and from the labourers recruited in Mauritius and later in Seychelles who joined them after emancipation (see § Enslaved people and the origins of the population and § Slavery, apprenticeship and emancipation). According to Vine, a distinct society had formed by the end of the nineteenth century: the population was close to 1,000, a Chagos Kreol related to the creoles of Mauritius and Seychelles had emerged, and people born in the islands had become known by the Kreol name Ilois, "islanders". Wenban-Smith describes them as "a community of islanders—the Ilois—distinct from the increasingly Indianised population of Mauritius". The two governments use the names differently: Mauritius calls the Chagossians "Mauritian nationals", while the United Kingdom uses "Chagossian" on the basis that the term has "no implications for the legal status of the islands or the nationality of the Chagossians".

Island life was organised around the plantations, which, in the words of the High Court, the companies ran "in a somewhat feudal manner"; by the 1960s, according to Vine, everyone was guaranteed work and a pension, housing was free, and workers had regular leave with free passage to Mauritius. Most islanders were Roman Catholics, although religious practices of African, Malagasy and Indian origin persisted. Their music and dance, the séga, was inscribed by UNESCO in 2019 as Sega tambour Chagos on its list of intangible cultural heritage in need of urgent safeguarding.

The 1964 Anglo-American survey counted 993 people on the three inhabited atolls; the arbitral tribunal in Mauritius v United Kingdom put the Chagossian population in 1965, including people born in the islands, at between 1,500 and 1,750. When the base was planned, British officials described the inhabitants as contract labourers, and in 1970 a legal adviser listed among the purposes of an immigration ordinance "to maintain the fiction that the inhabitants of Chagos are not a permanent or semi-permanent population". The United Kingdom told the International Court of Justice in 2018 that it "regrets not putting before the United Nations in the 1960s a complete picture as to the number of second and third generation inhabitants".

After their removal most of the islanders lived in Mauritius and a minority in Seychelles. The British Overseas Territories Act 2002 made them, and some of their children, British citizens, and many then moved to the United Kingdom, mainly to Crawley in West Sussex; in 2022 the British government estimated that there were about 10,000 Chagossians in the United Kingdom, Mauritius and Seychelles. Since 2022 the direct descendants of Chagossians born in the islands have been able to register as British citizens. Chagossians most often describe their removal with the Kreol word derasine, from the French déraciner, "to uproot", and the anthropologist Laura Jeffery has said that the displacement has become central to their cultural identity.

== Detachment and depopulation (1965–1973) ==
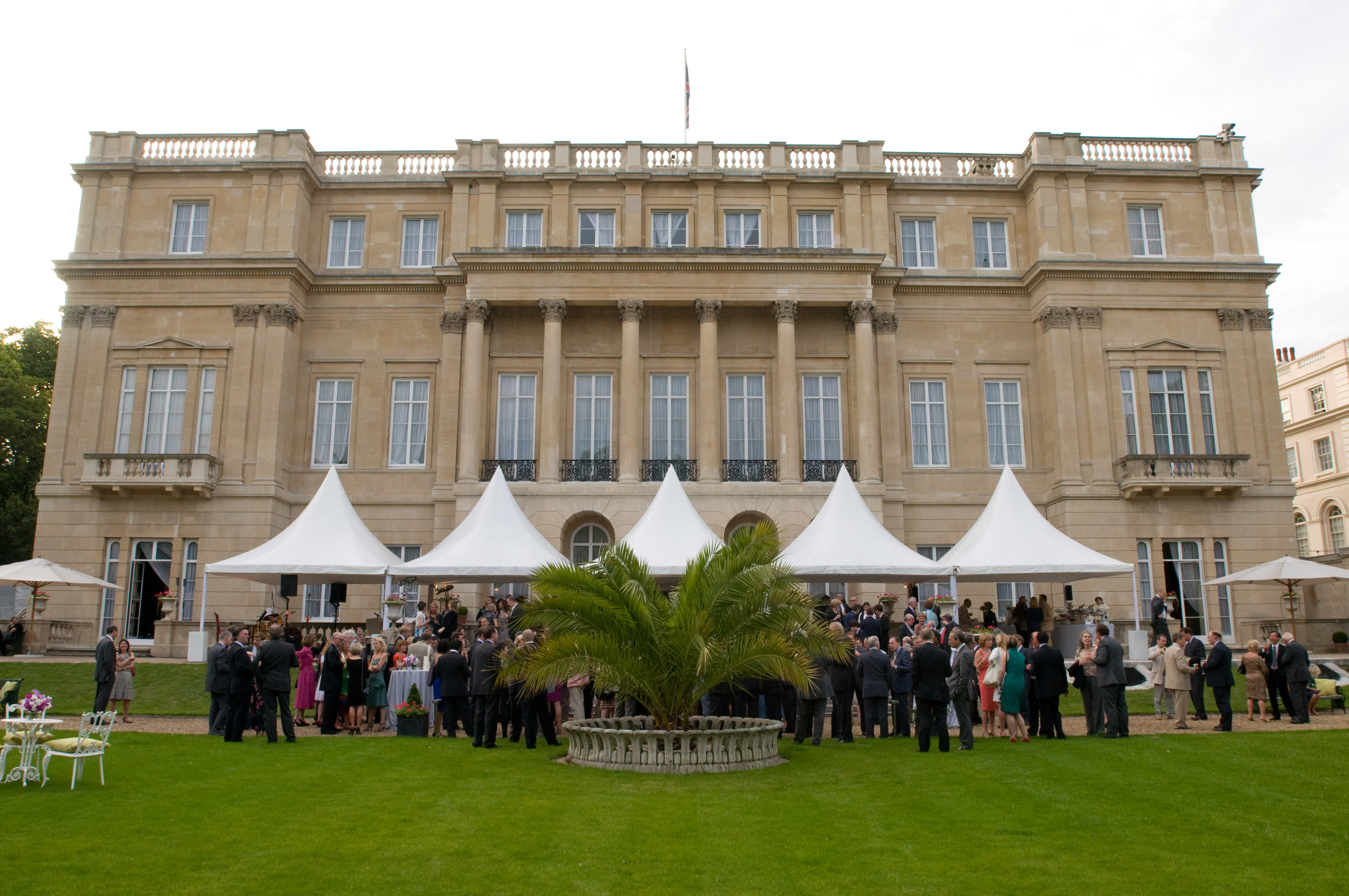
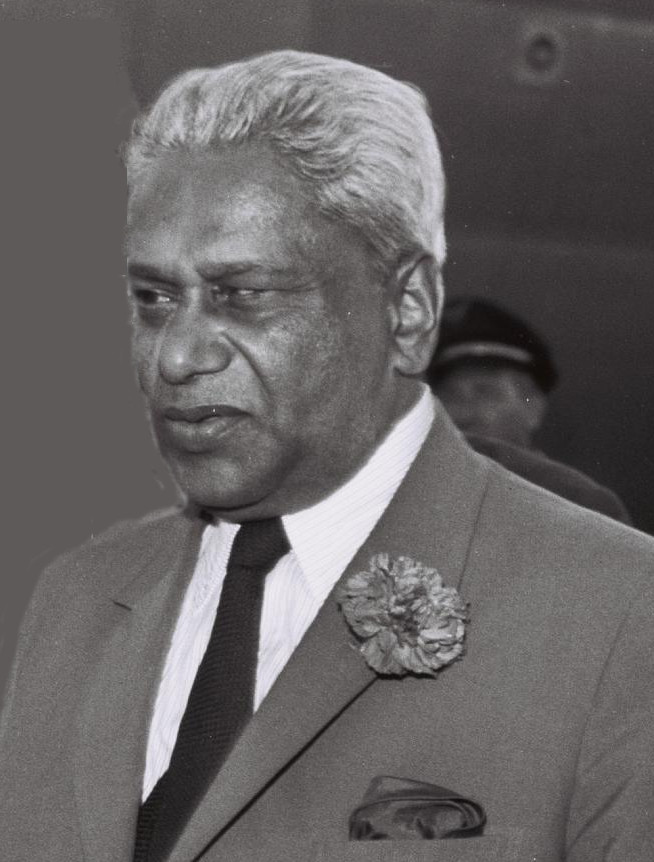
Lancaster House, London (left), where on 23 September 1965 the Premier of Mauritius, Seewoosagur Ramgoolam (right, photographed in the early 1960s), and two other ministers agreed in principle to the detachment of the archipelago islands after being told that the islands could still be detatch without their consent and Mauritius independence will not be granted

In 1964 the United States sought a military facility on Diego Garcia, and British officials agreed to recommend that the United Kingdom should acquire the land, resettle the population and pay compensation, while the United States built and maintained the facility. Not wanting the base to depend on newly independent states, the Americans asked for the whole archipelago to be detached. At Lancaster House on 23 September 1965, during the conference on Mauritian independence, the Premier, Seewoosagur Ramgoolam, and two other ministers agreed in principle to detachment in return for compensation of £3 million and undertakings that included the islands' return to Mauritius when they were no longer needed for defence. The British Indian Ocean Territory was created on 8 November 1965 from the archipelago and three islands detached from Seychelles, which were returned to Seychelles in 1976. Whether Mauritius's consent was freely given is disputed: Mauritius argues that "the choice that was given to the Mauritian Ministers was, in fact, no choice at all", while the United Kingdom calls the agreement "a freely negotiated package". In 2019 the International Court of Justice concluded that the detachment "was not based on the free and genuine expression of the will of the people concerned".

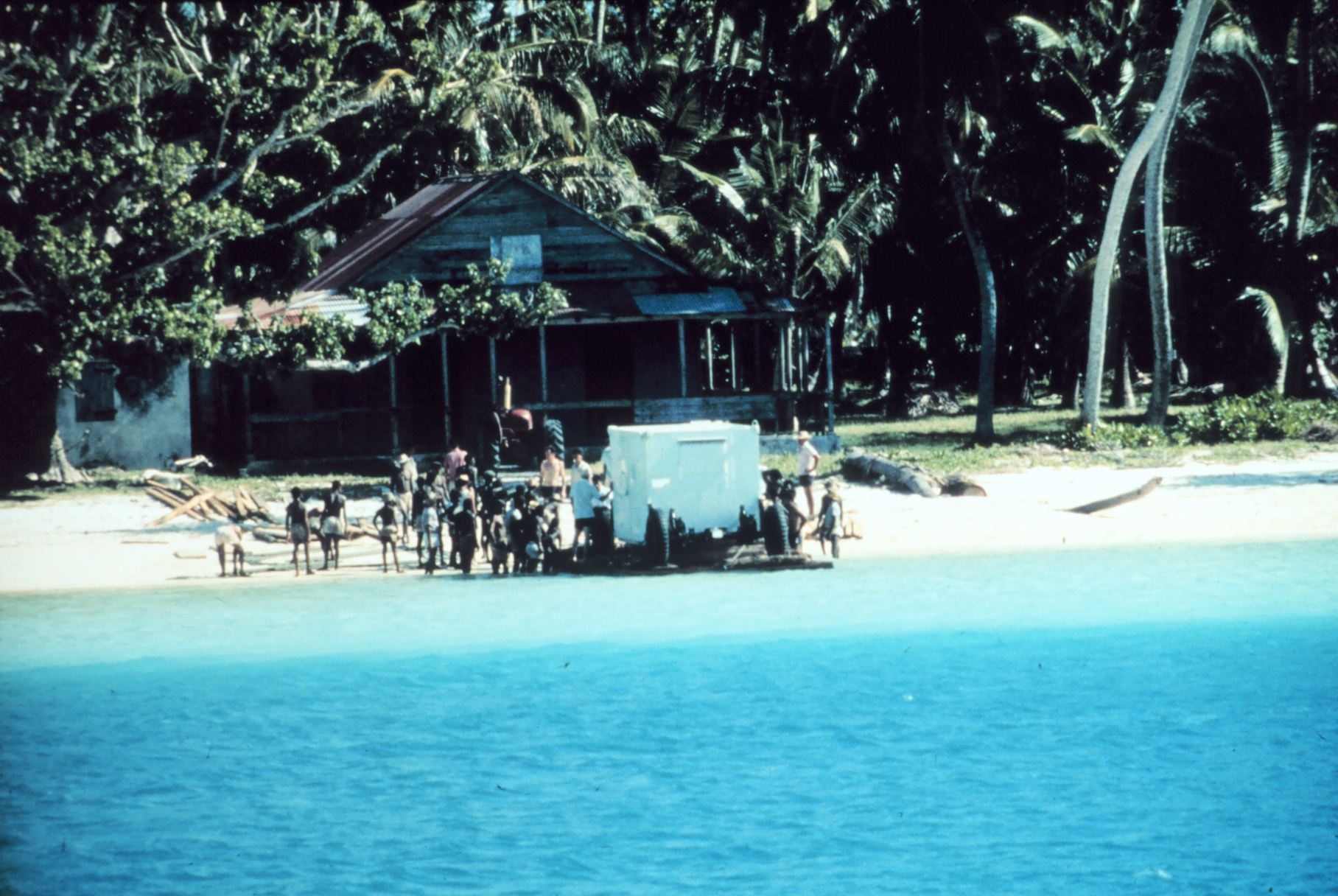
Ilois helping US personnel to bring equipment ashore on Diego Garcia, 1971

Under notes exchanged on 30 December 1966, the territory was made available for the defence needs of both governments for an initial 50 years. A confidential Agreed Minute listed "resettling any inhabitants" among the administrative measures the United Kingdom was to take. Islanders who went to Mauritius in 1967 and 1968 on leave, at the end of their contracts or for medical treatment were refused passage home. In 1969 ministers decided to aim at moving the whole population to Mauritius and Seychelles. In January 1971 the people of Diego Garcia were told that the island would close, and an Immigration Ordinance of 16 April 1971 made it unlawful to be in the territory without a permit. Between July and October 1971 they were shipped to Peros Banhos and the Salomon Islands or to Seychelles and Mauritius. As the remaining plantations closed, the people of Salomon and Peros Banhos were taken to Mauritius in 1972 and 1973; the last ship left Peros Banhos on 26 May 1973.

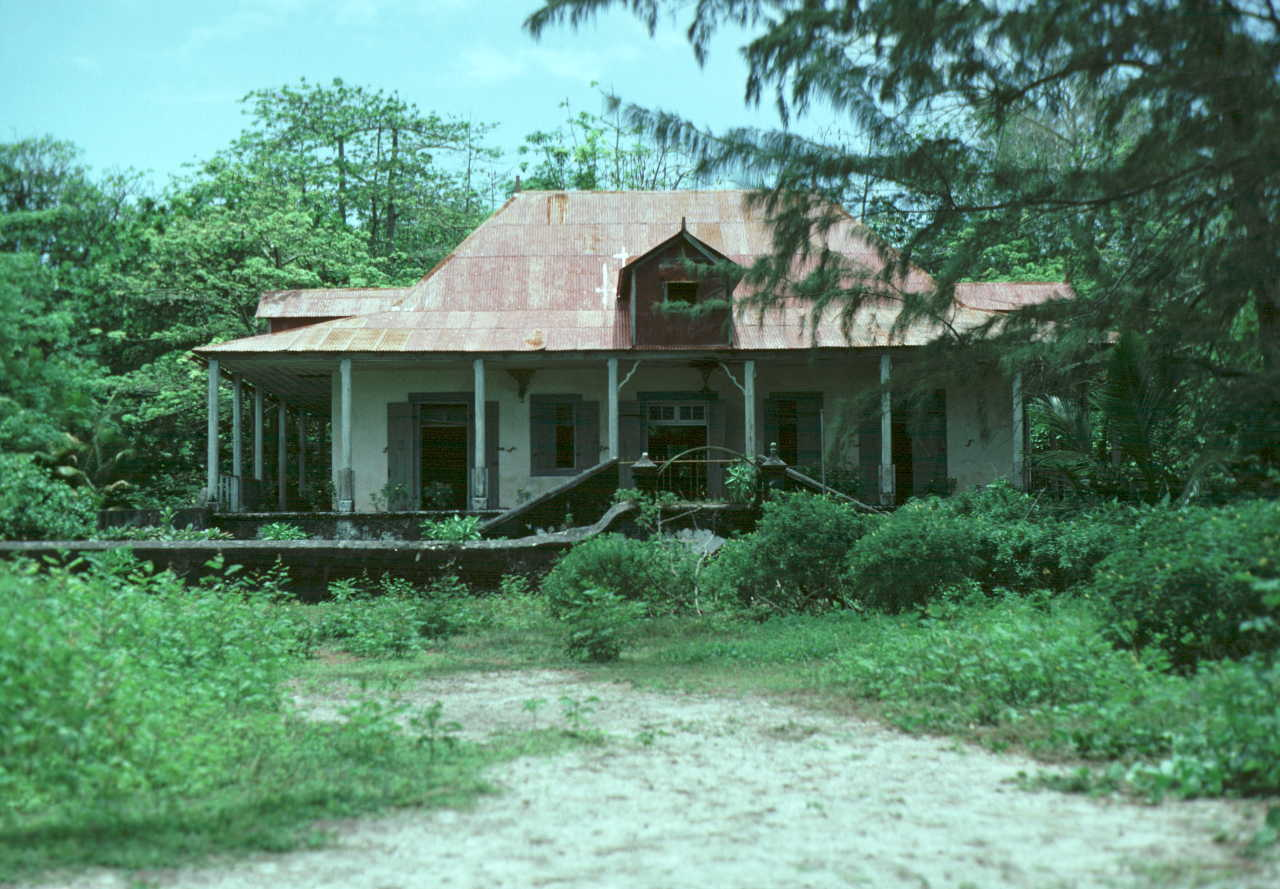
Dilapidated plantation buildings on Diego Garcia in 1982. The island's inhabitants had been removed between July and October 1971.

The International Court of Justice found that the whole population had been "either prevented from returning or forcibly removed and prevented from returning by the United Kingdom". The High Court found no evidence that physical force had been used. Lord Hoffmann said that there was no evidence that the 1971 ordinance had ever been used to expel anyone; those who left did so because the alternative was "being abandoned without support or supplies". The British government accepted in 2008 that the removal had been carried out "with a callous disregard of their interests". In 1972 Mauritius accepted £650,000 "in full and final discharge" of the British undertaking to meet resettlement costs. The money was paid out to the islanders in cash only in 1977 and 1978. In 1975 a former inhabitant, Michel Vencatessen, brought a damages claim in London (Vencatessen v Attorney General). Under a 1982 agreement with Mauritius that followed, the United Kingdom paid a further £4 million ex gratia, without admitting liability. The money was paid to 1,344 islanders, who were asked to sign or thumbprint a renunciation form written in English.

== Exile and the sovereignty dispute (1973–present) ==
Peros Banhos atoll from the International Space Station, 2014. Chagossians landed on Île du Coin, in the atoll, in February 2026.

No resettlement scheme awaited the islanders in Mauritius, and the High Court found that "extreme poverty routinely marked their lives". From the late 1970s Ilois committees campaigned for compensation and the right to return, and demonstrations and hunger strikes by women became a feature of the campaign. Mauritian politicians also used the issue to attack Ramgoolam's government. The Chagos Refugees Group was founded in about 1983; Olivier Bancoult told the High Court that it was set up "as an Ilois group for Ilois, because they felt betrayed by Mauritian politicians and intellectuals". Bancoult, its leader, brought the series of cases in the English courts that began in 1998.

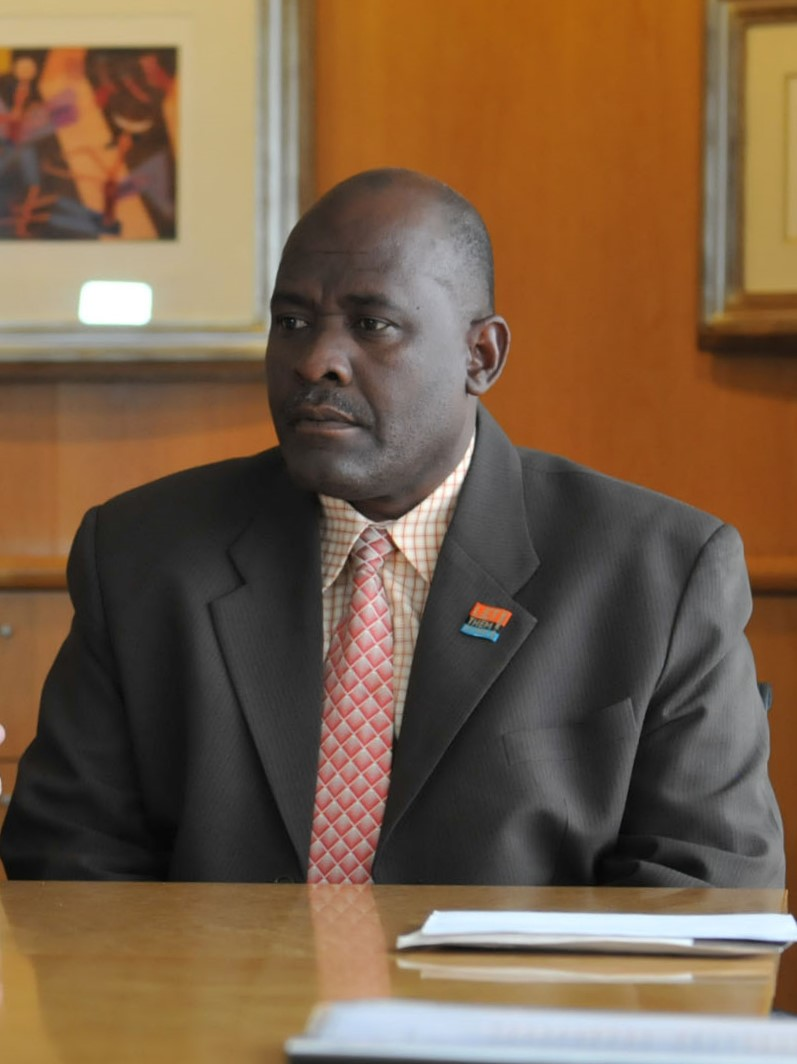
Olivier Bancoult, leader of the Chagos Refugees Group, in 2013. He brought the series of cases in the English courts that began in 1998.

In 2000 the Divisional Court quashed the provision of the 1971 ordinance that excluded the islanders (Bancoult (No 1)). In 2003 the High Court gave summary judgment against a group claim for compensation (Chagos Islanders v Attorney General). Orders in council of 2004 again declared that no one had the right of abode, and the House of Lords upheld them by three votes to two in 2008 (Bancoult (No 2)). The European Court of Human Rights declared an application by 1,786 Chagossians inadmissible in 2012 (Chagos Islanders v United Kingdom). Later challenges to the marine protected area and to the government's 2016 decision against resettlement, which it accompanied with a support package of about £40 million for Chagossian communities, also failed.

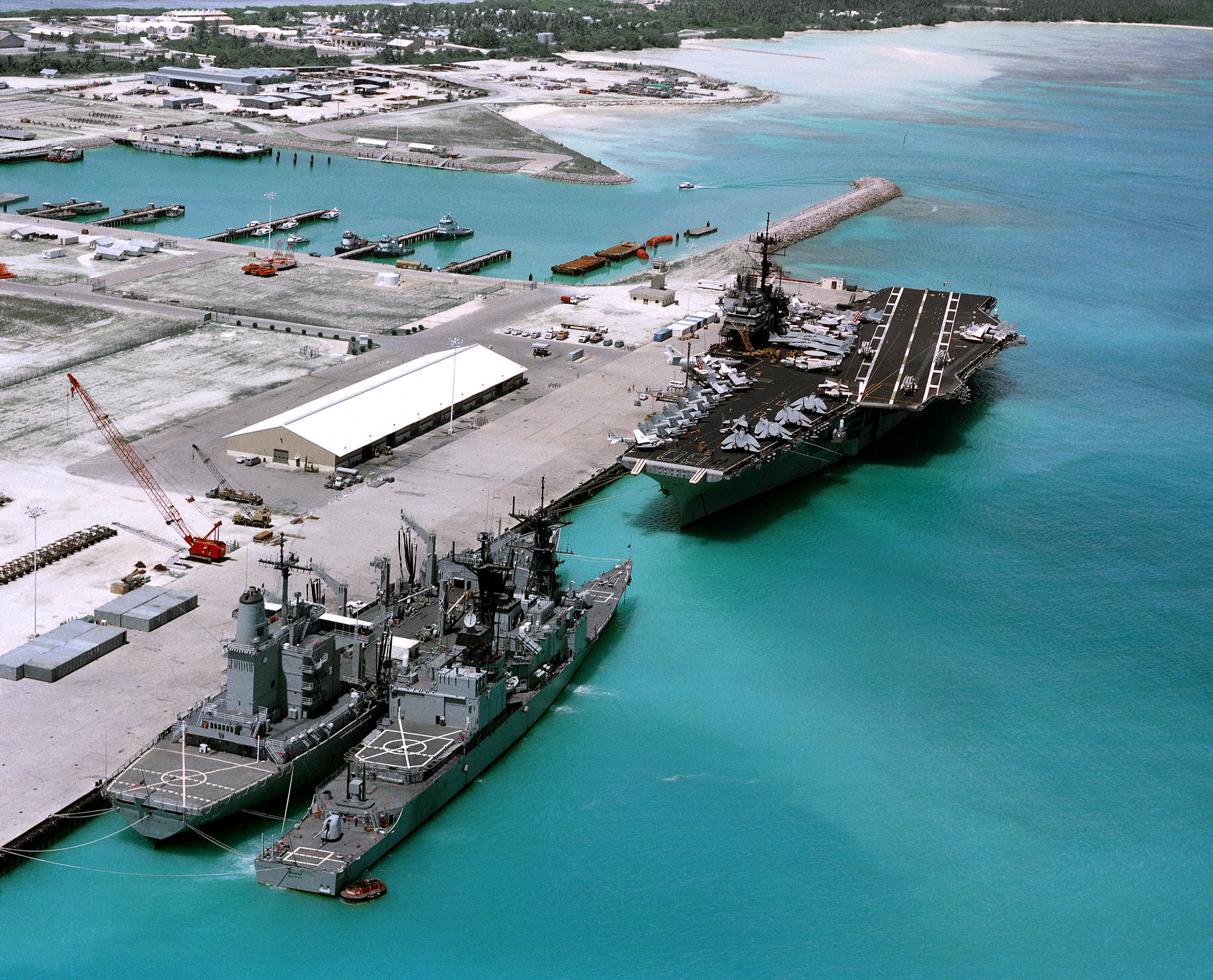
The aircraft carrier USS Saratoga and other US Navy ships moored at Diego Garcia in December 1985

Construction of the base on Diego Garcia began in March 1971. Notes of 1972 approved "a limited naval communications facility on Diego Garcia", and a 1976 agreement allowed it to become "a support facility of the United States Navy". Bombers flying from the island were used in the war in Afghanistan from 2001 and in the invasion of Iraq. In 2008 the British government acknowledged that, despite earlier assurances, the island had been used for two rendition flights in 2002.

Mauritius took up its claim in 1980, when Ramgoolam asked the UN General Assembly to restore the archipelago to Mauritius. Since 1992 the Constitution of Mauritius has included the archipelago in the national territory. The United Kingdom maintained that the territory "is British and has been since 1814" and would be ceded to Mauritius "when no longer required for defence purposes". After the United Kingdom declared the Chagos Marine Protected Area in 2010, Mauritius brought an arbitration under the Law of the Sea Convention (Mauritius v United Kingdom). In 2015 the tribunal held that the Lancaster House undertakings were legally binding and that the protected area had been declared in breach of the convention, but declined jurisdiction over sovereignty. At the General Assembly's request, the International Court of Justice advised in 2019 that the decolonisation of Mauritius "was not lawfully completed" and that the United Kingdom must end its administration "as rapidly as possible" (Legal Consequences of the Separation of the Chagos Archipelago from Mauritius in 1965). The Assembly endorsed the opinion in resolution 73/295. In 2021 and 2023 a special chamber of the International Tribunal for the Law of the Sea treated Mauritius as the coastal state when it fixed the maritime boundary with the Maldives (Mauritius–Maldives maritime boundary case). The British government said that the opinion "is not a legally binding judgment".

The two governments opened negotiations in November 2022. On 22 May 2025 they signed a treaty whose first article provides that "Mauritius is sovereign over the Chagos Archipelago in its entirety, including Diego Garcia". Under the treaty Mauritius authorises the United Kingdom to operate the base on Diego Garcia for an initial 99 years, and Mauritius is "free to implement a programme of resettlement" on the other islands. Chagossians were divided: the Chagos Refugees Group supported the treaty because it allowed resettlement, while, according to Bancoult, three groups, Chagos Asylum People, Chagossian Voices and BIOT Citizens, opposed it. UN special rapporteurs said that the treaty "appears to be at variance with the Chagossians' right to return", and the Committee on the Elimination of Racial Discrimination called for its ratification to be suspended. Two Chagossian women born on Diego Garcia who opposed the treaty said that they had asked the committee to act. Ratification stalled in 2026 after the position of the US President changed, and the British implementing bill lapsed in April. As of November 2026 the treaty had been signed but had not entered into force, and the British government said that it could not obtain American consent for the existing arrangements. In December 2025 Chagossians in Britain who opposed the transfer formed a self-declared Chagossian Government‑in‑Exile under Misley Mandarin. On 16 February 2026 Mandarin and three others landed without permits on Île du Coin in Peros Banhos, intending to resettle it (Resettlement of Île du Coin). On 31 March 2026 the territory's Supreme Court quashed the 2004 provision that "no person has the right of abode in the Territory", while holding that the group were on the island unlawfully. Its decision was stayed pending an appeal, which was heard in July; judgment was due on 12 November 2026.

== Historiography ==
The National Archives at Kew, London, which Vine identifies, with the Mauritius Archives, as the most important source of primary material on the islands

The earliest accounts of Chagossian society come from colonial records: magistrates' reports, census returns and the writings of visitors such as Dussercle, who published several books in Mauritius about his missions to the islands. Vine identifies the Mauritius Archives and the National Archives at Kew as the most important primary sources. He names two books by former officials as the main histories: Limuria: The Lesser Dependencies of Mauritius (1961) by Scott, a former governor of Mauritius, and Peak of Limuria (1993) by Edis, a former commissioner of the British Indian Ocean Territory. Scott made a plea for understanding of the islanders' "unique condition", and the Chagossians relied on his population estimate in court. Edis quoted Scott's remark that the islands' society "was not a natural island society", and concluded that no community could have survived the closure of the plantations.

Internal British documents disclosed in the Chagossian litigation were summarised by the Divisional Court in 2000 and in a documentary appendix of nearly 800 paragraphs to the High Court's 2003 judgment. Vine's Island of Shame (2009) is an ethnographic study of both the Chagossians and the US officials who planned the base. Wenban-Smith, himself a former commissioner of the territory, and the historian Marina Carter met while researching in the Mauritian national archives. Their 560-page Chagos: A History (2016) covers the islands up to 1973, including the gradual emergence of the island-born Ilois community.

The two governments' accounts of the islands' history (see § Relationship with Mauritius) draw on different material: Mauritius's account of Chagossian society in its 2018 written statement cites Vine and Edis, extracts of whose books it annexed, while the United Kingdom has referred to the facts of the removal "set out in very considerable detail" in the Chagossian cases in the English courts.

== Timeline ==
The following tables list the main events in the history of the archipelago in chronological order.

=== Before 1810 ===
Chart of the islands north-east of Madagascar, covering the Mascarenes, Seychelles and the Chagos, by d'Après de Mannevillette, 1775

View of the Chagos and adjacent islands, published by Alexander Dalrymple in 1784

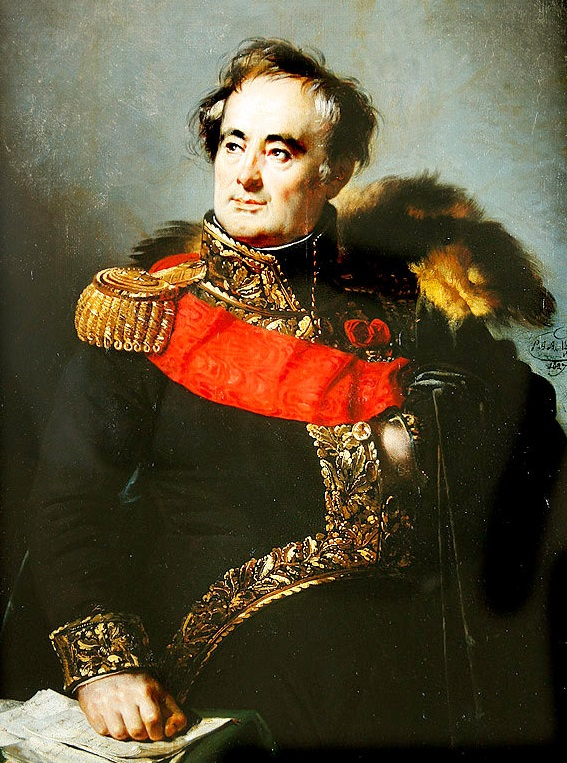
Charles Decaen, Captain-General of Île de France, in an 1827 portrait

Timeline of the Chagos Archipelago before 1810
Date	Event
Early 16th century	Portuguese navigators sighted and named the islands, probably in the first two decades after Vasco da Gama opened the sea route to India in 1498; the Portuguese names Peros Banhos and Three Brothers (Tres Irmãos) survive. (Note: The origin of the name Diego Garcia is uncertain: Edis mentioned a possible combination of the names of two Portuguese fleet commanders, Diego Lopes and Garcia de Noronha, and an account of a visit by a Spanish navigator named Diego Garcia in 1532, but regarded any explanation as speculation, while Mauritius's pleadings attribute the discovery of the archipelago to Diego García de Moguer.)
1538	The archipelago, known to the Portuguese as Chagas, appeared on Portuguese charts as early as 1538 but remained largely untouched.
22 August 1555	The Portuguese ship Conceição, bound for India, ran aground on Peros Banhos; according to the former British Indian Ocean Territory Commissioner Richard Edis, her officers left in the only undamaged boat, abandoning some 350 crew and passengers, of whom about 50 eventually reached India.
Mid-16th century	Dom Manuel, a Christian king of the Maldives installed by the Portuguese, laid claim to the islands, which the Maldivians called Folovahi, but two Maldivian attempts to colonise them failed because the settlers could not locate them.
1602	An English fleet under James Lancaster was trapped for several days within the reefs of the Great Chagos Bank before finding a way out to the north.
1715	After the Dutch, who had occupied Mauritius from 1638, abandoned it in 1710, France took possession of the island and renamed it Île de France, while the archipelago remained rarely visited by Europeans.
1744	Lazare Picault visited Peros Banhos in the Élisabeth, and France claimed the atoll, the first step in a progressive French claim to and survey of the archipelago, which France administered as a dependency of Île de France.
1760–1777	British ships had called at the archipelago since 1719, and in the 1760s and 1770s ships from British India surveyed several of its atolls and banks; the Egmont Islands, Eagle Island and the Salomon Islands are named after the ships Egmont, Eagle and Salomon, which visited them in 1760, 1772 and 1777 respectively.
1769–1770	The French ships L'Heure du Berger and Vert Galant surveyed Diego Garcia in September 1769, and in 1770 La Fontaine made the first survey of its lagoon; Mauritius dates the French claim to Diego Garcia to 1769.
1783	Pierre Marie Le Normand, a planter from Île de France, obtained approval for a concession to settle Diego Garcia; the 22 enslaved Africans he brought there were probably the archipelago's first permanent inhabitants, and coconut plantations worked by enslaved labourers soon spread to other islands. (Note: Accounts of the first settlement differ. A grant of Diego Garcia to a Monsieur Dupuit de la Faye in 1778 is recorded. The anthropologist David Vine dates the colonial government's "favourable reply" to Le Normand's petition to 17 February 1783, and the Mauritian historian Satyendra Peerthum, citing the National Archives of Mauritius, writes that Le Normand sailed for Diego Garcia in 1784 with 79 enslaved Mozambicans and Malagasies and a few free skilled workers. Mauritius's Memorial says that permanent settlement probably came about through the 1783 concession, and that the first slave colony was probably on Peros Banhos. Edis and the geographer D. R. Stoddart instead place the coconut concessions, Le Normand's among them, in the later 1780s, after the British expedition of 1786, and the British Indian Ocean Territory Administration states that the islands "were uninhabited until the late 18th century, when the French established copra plantations using slave labour in 1793".)
April–May 1786	An East India Company expedition from Bombay, sent to set up a victualling station, entered the Diego Garcia lagoon on 27 April, found Le Normand's small establishment, and on 4 May took formal possession of the island and its dependencies for George III and the company.
May 1786	Lieutenant Archibald Blair of the East India Company's marine surveyed Diego Garcia, producing a map that Edis considered highly accurate, and went on to survey the rest of the archipelago.
August–October 1786	After a protest from the Governor of Île de France, the Vicomte de Souillac, and doubts about the settlement's cost and viability, the Bombay Council under Governor Rawson Hart Boddam ordered the settlement to be withdrawn, and the expedition sailed away in October.
Late 1786	The French frigate Minerve, sent from Île de France to remove the British, arrived after they had left; Magon de Médine formally reasserted the French claim, and a stone marker proclaiming French sovereignty was put up.
1793	Lapotaire, of Port Louis, was allowed to set up a factory on Diego Garcia to produce copra and coconut oil on the island, and sent out two ships with 25 to 30 men each and a complement of enslaved workers.
1790s–1808	Encouraged by the high price of oil during the British blockade of Île de France, other planters, among them the brothers Cayeux at East Point and Minni Minni, set up plantations and a fishing settlement on Diego Garcia, and by 1808 about 100 enslaved people worked for Lapotaire alone.
26 April 1809	The Captain-General of Île de France, Decaen, granted the eastern part of Diego Garcia to two newcomers, Blévec and Chépé, banned the making of oil on the atoll, and made the concession-holders responsible for people with leprosy sent there from Île de France. (Note: Edis writes that the French in Mauritius seem to have begun using Diego Garcia as a leper colony, apparently in the belief that turtle meat helped to cure the disease, and records an account of a British ship's crew encountering a small party of lepers there in 1792; according to Peerthum, the French and then the British authorities sent people with leprosy there by force until 1828.)

=== British dependency (1810–1965) ===
Port Louis, from a set of views of the British campaign of 1810 published in 1813

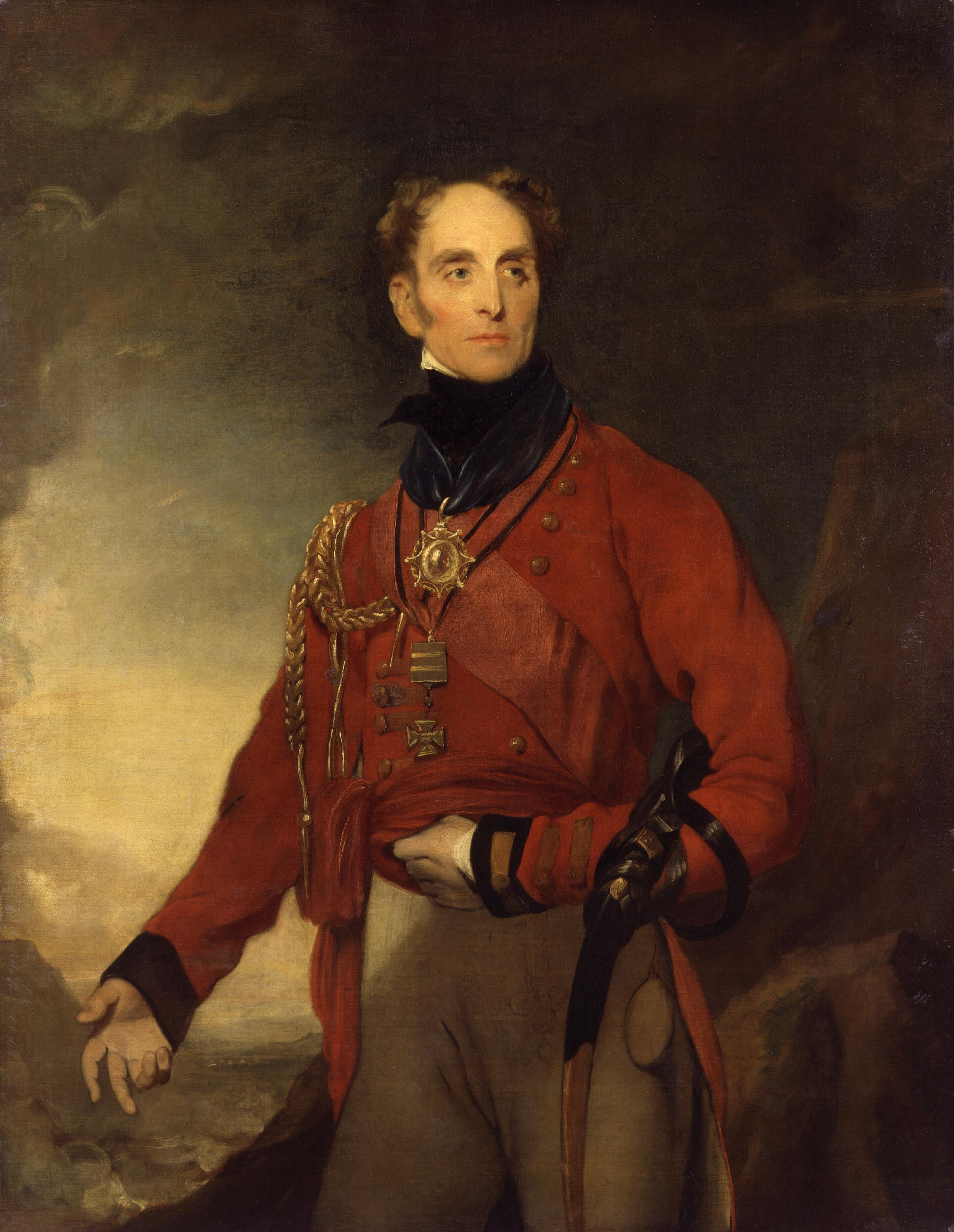
Sir Lowry Cole, Governor of Mauritius, who listed the Chagos islands among its dependencies in 1826

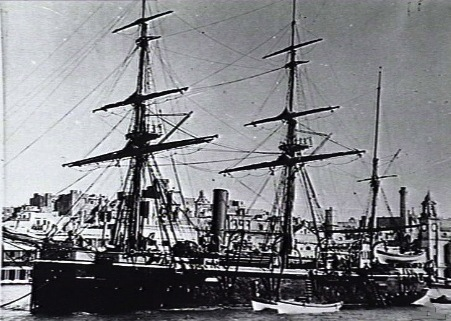
The survey ship HMS Rambler, which resurveyed the lagoon of Diego Garcia in 1885

Admiralty chart of Diego Garcia from the 1885 survey by HMS Rambler, published in 1886

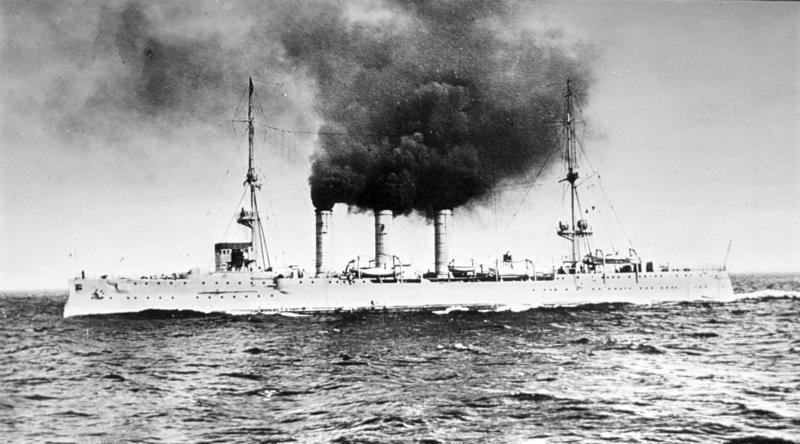
The German cruiser Emden, which called at Diego Garcia in 1914

Timeline of the Chagos Archipelago as a British dependency of Mauritius, 1810–1965
Date	Event
3 December 1810	British forces from India captured Île de France, which was renamed Mauritius; the capitulation covered all its dependencies, including the Chagos.
1813	Governor Robert Farquhar granted a concession for a coconut plantation on Peros Banhos, and plantations were also set up that year on the Three Brothers, Eagle Island and the Salomon Islands, following one on Six Islands (the Egmont group) in 1808.
30 May 1814	By the Treaty of Paris, France ceded Île de France and all its dependencies, including the Chagos Archipelago, to the United Kingdom, which administered the archipelago as a dependency of the colony of Mauritius until 1965. (Note: The two states agree that the archipelago was among the dependencies ceded in 1814, and the arbitral tribunal in Mauritius v United Kingdom recorded that these early events "are not in dispute between the Parties". They differ on what the cession meant: Mauritius argues that the treaty "clearly recognised the Chagos Archipelago as part of the territory of Mauritius", while the United Kingdom maintains that the islands "were never an integral part of Mauritius, but were among its Dependencies".)
1815	In a proclamation, the first British Governor, Sir Robert Farquhar, declared that the Acts of Parliament abolishing the slave trade extended to "every, even the most remote and minute portion" of the Crown's possessions and dependencies, although slaving directly to the islands probably continued in secret for some years.
1824	After unrest among the planters, the enslaved workers and the people with leprosy still being sent there, Le Camus was appointed as the first British official on Diego Garcia, also responsible for the anchorage and a quarantine station.
19 September 1826	A list of the dependencies of Mauritius sent by Governor Sir Lowry Cole included Diego Garcia, Six Islands, the Three Brothers, Salomon and Peros Banhos.
1826	Colonial returns recorded 377 enslaved people in the archipelago, 269 men and 108 women, with 22 free people and 9 white people; Diego Garcia had 275 inhabitants, including 218 enslaved people and 37 people with leprosy. (Note: Peerthum, using the same returns, gives 375 enslaved people and a total of 448 inhabitants, including 42 people with leprosy.)
1835	Slavery was abolished in Mauritius and its dependencies, freeing the enslaved workers of the Chagos plantations, most of whom had been brought from Mozambique and Madagascar; an Assistant Protector of Slaves, George Harrison, visited the islands that year to supervise their emancipation. (Note: Edis dates the formal abolition of slavery in Mauritius and its dependencies to August 1834, Peerthum dates emancipation to February 1835, and Vine dates abolition to 1835; Mauritius's written statement to the International Court of Justice and the High Court's judgment of 2003 in Chagos Islanders v Attorney General refer to the abolition of slavery in 1833, the year of the Slavery Abolition Act.)
1837	Commander Robert Moresby of the Indian Navy made the first full hydrographic survey of Diego Garcia, whose charts remained in use for a century, and planted breadfruit trees brought from Ceylon.
1838	Special Justice Charles Anderson, sent to report on the apprentices, found conditions on Diego Garcia "decidedly inferior to those of labourers on the other islands I have visited" and ordered a reduction in their daily tasks.
1839–1840	The apprenticeship of former slaves came to an end, after which labourers worked under contracts for wages, although, according to Edis, life on the islands otherwise continued much as before. (Note: Stoddart dates the final abolition of slavery to 1839 and Edis final emancipation to 1840, while Vine describes a period of apprenticeship lasting about four years after abolition in 1835.)
2 June 1852	An ordinance empowered the Governor of Mauritius to extend to "the Seychelles Islands and other Dependencies of Mauritius" laws published in the colony, adapted to local circumstances; an ordinance of 1853 transferred the power to the Governor in Executive Council.
1859	Two special commissioners appointed by the Mauritius government, Berkeley and Caldwell, toured the island dependencies to inquire into the workers' "state, treatment, and wages", accompanied by the Anglican Bishop of Mauritius, Vincent Ryan. (Note: The United Kingdom dates the commissioners' tour to 1859–1860, and says that the holders of the concessions were "little troubled by the Government in Mauritius" until then.)
1864	Diego Garcia's three estates, East Point, Pointe Marianne and Minni Minni, produced some 99,000 gallons of coconut oil, and several of the buildings that survive at East Point bear the date 1864.
1865	The government allowed the holders of the plantation concessions (jouissances) to convert them into freeholds for a payment based on their oil output, and nearly all of them did so.
10 February 1872	An ordinance made the Junior District Magistrate of Port Louis the District Magistrate for the islands, with the same jurisdiction "as if the said Islands formed part of the District of Port Louis". (Note: Stoddart dates the appointment of a district magistrate for the islands to 1864, and Edis dates visits by district magistrates from that year; the United Kingdom states that a District Magistrate was appointed to the Lesser Dependencies in 1872.)
1875	An ordinance created a police and stipendiary magistrate for "the smaller Dependencies commonly called 'Oil Islands'", and E. P. Brooks made the first regular magistrate's tour, fining an under-manager for striking a labourer and the manager of East Point for imprisoning three labourers without sufficient cause. (Note: Mauritius dates the ordinance (No. 41 of 1875) to 28 December 1875 and the United Kingdom to 31 December 1875.)
1882	After the opening of the Suez Canal, the Orient Steam Navigation Company moved its coaling station for the Australian route from Aden to Diego Garcia, where Lund and Company also set up, and 34 large steamers called to coal in the second half of 1883.
1883	Diego Garcia's three estates were merged into the Société Huilière de Diégo et Péros, which ran them, with the plantations of the outer islands, until 1962.
16 September 1885	Letters Patent defined the colony as "the Island of Mauritius and its Dependencies". (Note: The United Kingdom's position is that such definitions included the islands in the colony only "for some purposes", and that they were "in law and in fact quite distinct from the Island of Mauritius".)
1885	With order disrupted by imported labourers and by the crews and passengers of visiting ships, a police post of an inspector, a sergeant and six constables from Mauritius was set up at Minni Minni, and HMS Rambler resurveyed the lagoon for ships calling to coal.
1888	The Orient company stopped coaling at Diego Garcia after six unprofitable years, and the police post was withdrawn after disputes between Mauritius and London over its cost; regular British police officers were not stationed on the island again until 1973.
1895	A chapel was built at East Point, followed by a church there and chapels on other islands, and most islanders came to regard themselves as Roman Catholics.
c. 1900	The archipelago's population, about 760 in 1880, approached 1,000, and a distinct society had emerged, with its own Kreol and a collective name for the island-born, the Ilois.
1903	Seychelles, until then a dependency of Mauritius, became a separate colony; the Chagos Archipelago remained one of the Lesser Dependencies of Mauritius. (Note: The United Kingdom describes the separation of Seychelles as the most important of several administrative rearrangements, and argues that dependencies "could be, and often were, detached or attached as between one colony and another by exercise of the Royal Prerogative"; Mauritius points out that Rodrigues, Agaléga and St. Brandon, which were also dependencies, remained part of Mauritius at independence.)
1903 – c. 1910	After the Seychelles government introduced copra-drying platforms in 1903, copra replaced coconut oil as the islands' main export to Mauritius by about 1910, so that, in Stoddart's words, the "Oil Islands" were "oil islands no longer".
18 April 1904	The Lesser Dependencies Ordinance provided for district and stipendiary magistrates for the islands, each of which was to be visited, as far as possible, at least once a year.
1908–1921	Coëtivy in 1908 and Farquhar in December 1921 were transferred to Seychelles, after which the Lesser Dependencies of Mauritius consisted of the Chagos Archipelago, Agaléga and St Brandon.
October 1914	Early in the First World War, the German cruiser SMS Emden called at Diego Garcia to take on coal and clean her hull; the islanders, who received mail only twice a year by way of Mauritius, had not heard that war had broken out. (Note: Stoddart dates the visit to 9 October 1914; the British Indian Ocean Territory Administration gives 5 October 1914 and says that the ship stayed for about a week.)
August 1931	After a strike by plantation workers on Peros Banhos, a magistrate and 12 police officers were sent from Mauritius to suppress the disturbance.
November 1933	Roger Dussercle, a French Catholic priest sent by the Archbishop of Port Louis, began a series of pastoral visits, recording that about 60 per cent of Diego Garcia's people had been born and raised there and that they spoke a Creole similar to that of Mauritius.
1935	New owners established the first regular steamship connection between Mauritius and the Chagos.
1937	A manager's attempt to ban the séga dance on Salomon led to an insurrection.
1942	During the Second World War, after the Japanese attack on Colombo in April 1942, Diego Garcia became a fuelling and minor operational base for naval craft and flying boats, with a Royal Air Force station at East Point and two six-inch naval guns at Cannon Point manned by Mauritian and Indian troops.
3 March 1945	The Courts Ordinance provided for "Magistrates for Mauritius and the Dependencies", with jurisdiction in every district of the colony and in the dependencies.
1946–1947	From 1946 the United Kingdom regularly transmitted information to the UN General Assembly on Mauritius as a non-self-governing territory, and its 1947 report described Mauritius as comprising the island and its dependencies, including the Oil Islands group, whose principal island is Diego Garcia.
1952–1962	The archipelago's population, which according to Nigel Wenban-Smith peaked at 1,158 in 1952, fell to 747 by 1962 as low wages, monotonous work, a lack of facilities and the distance from Mauritius and Seychelles discouraged recruitment, and that of Diego Garcia halved.
October 1955	The Governor of Mauritius, Sir Robert Scott, toured the Oil Islands, finding 680 people on Diego Garcia, and later described the islands in his book Limuria (1961).
1962	Chagos Agalega Company, a company formed in Seychelles, one of whose main shareholders was Paul Moulinié, acquired almost all of the plantation islands from the Mauritian companies that had owned them. (Note: Mauritius describes Chagos Agalega as a joint Mauritian and Seychellois company.)
25–27 February 1964	At talks in London on American defence interests in the Indian Ocean, the United States sought a communications facility on Diego Garcia, and British officials undertook to recommend that the administration of the archipelago be transferred from Mauritius and that Britain acquire the land and resettle the population.
26 February 1964	The Mauritius (Constitution) Order 1964 defined Mauritius as "the island of Mauritius and the Dependencies of Mauritius". (Note: Mauritius relies on the definition as showing that the archipelago was part of Mauritius until its detachment in 1965; the United Kingdom argues that the distinction between Mauritius and its dependencies was maintained in that constitution, which had to state expressly that Mauritius included its dependencies so that it would apply to them.)
July–August 1964	A joint Anglo-American team surveyed the archipelago and several islands of Seychelles, counting 993 people in the archipelago, 483 of them on Diego Garcia; its British member, Robert Newton, reported that the civilian population of islands required for military purposes could be removed and resettled.

=== Detachment and depopulation (1965–1976) ===
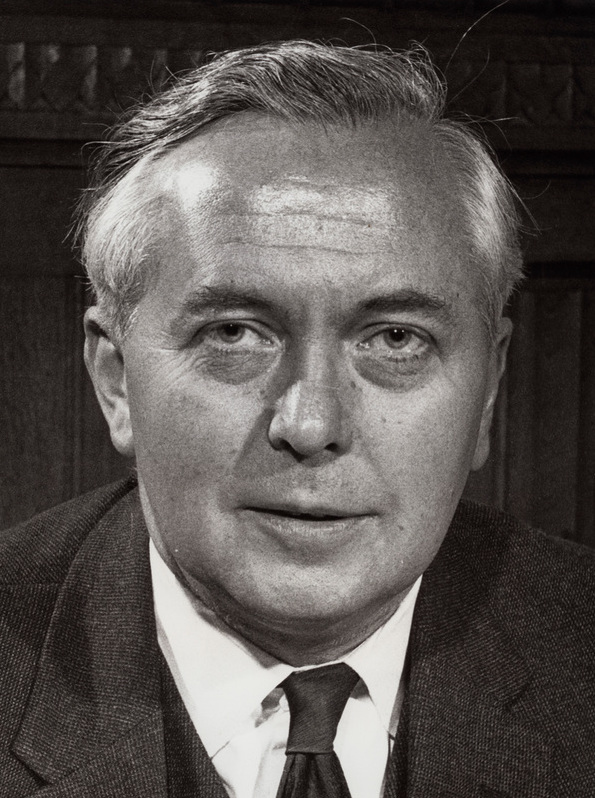
Harold Wilson (photographed in 1962), who as Prime Minister agreed in 1969 that the government should aim at moving the islanders to Seychelles and Mauritius

Timeline of the detachment and depopulation of the Chagos Archipelago, 1965–1976
Date	Event
23 September 1965	After being told that Britain could separate the islands without Mauritian consent and Mauritius independence would not be granted at the Lancaster House, the Premier of Mauritius, Seewoosagur Ramgoolam, and two other Mauritian ministers agreed in principle to the detachment of the archipelago in return for undertakings that included £3 million in compensation and the return of the islands to Mauritius when no longer needed for defence.
8 November 1965	The British Indian Ocean Territory Order 1965 detached the archipelago from Mauritius and combined it with Aldabra, Farquhar and Desroches, detached from Seychelles, to form a new colony, the British Indian Ocean Territory (BIOT).
16 December 1965	The General Assembly adopted resolution 2066 (XX) by 89 votes to none, with 18 abstentions, inviting the United Kingdom "to take no action which would dismember the Territory of Mauritius and violate its territorial integrity".
30 December 1966	The United Kingdom and the United States concluded an exchange of notes making the BIOT available for the defence purposes of both governments for an initial 50 years; an Agreed Minute of the same date listed "resettling any inhabitants" among the British administrative measures.
1967–1968	The depopulation of the archipelago began: islanders who had travelled to Mauritius on leave, at the end of their contracts or for medical treatment were refused passage home.
7 August 1967	Parties favouring independence won the Mauritian general election.
12 March 1968	Mauritius became independent; its constitution defined the country as the territories that had made up the colony immediately before independence, which did not include the archipelago.
July 1968	The BIOT Administration acquired the cargo ship Nordvaer to link the territory with Seychelles, and the shipping link between Mauritius and the archipelago largely ceased.
26 April 1969	Harold Wilson agreed to the Foreign Secretary's proposal that the government should "aim at the return of the inhabitants of the whole Chagos Archipelago to the Seychelles and Mauritius".
March 1971	United States Navy construction units (Seabees) landed on Diego Garcia to begin building a communications station and airstrip, whose runway was operational by July.
16 April 1971	The BIOT Commissioner enacted the Immigration Ordinance 1971, making it unlawful to enter or remain in the territory without a permit and allowing the removal of anyone there unlawfully.
July–October 1971	After the BIOT Administrator announced in January that Diego Garcia would be closed, its inhabitants were removed, mainly in July and September, to Peros Banhos, Salomon, Seychelles and Mauritius; the evacuation was completed on 31 October.
4 September 1972	Mauritius accepted £650,000 in full and final discharge of the British undertaking of 1965 to meet the cost of resettling people displaced from the archipelago; the money was paid in March 1973.
1972–1973	As the plantations on Salomon and Peros Banhos ran down, their inhabitants were shipped to Mauritius; Salomon closed in 1972, and the last ship left Peros Banhos on 26 May 1973, reaching Port Louis on 13 June with the last of the population.
25 February 1976	The Diego Garcia Agreement 1976 approved the development of the facility into a support facility of the United States Navy, its use other than in normal circumstances to be a matter for the joint decision of the two governments.
29 June 1976	Aldabra, Farquhar and Desroches were returned to Seychelles on its independence, leaving the Chagos Archipelago as the whole of the BIOT. (Note: By an exchange of notes of 22 June 1976, the United Kingdom and the United States removed the three islands from their 1966 agreement with effect from 28 June 1976.)

=== Exile, litigation and sovereignty (1977–present) ===
Map of Diego Garcia, with an inset of the Chagos Archipelago, produced by the US Central Intelligence Agency in 1980

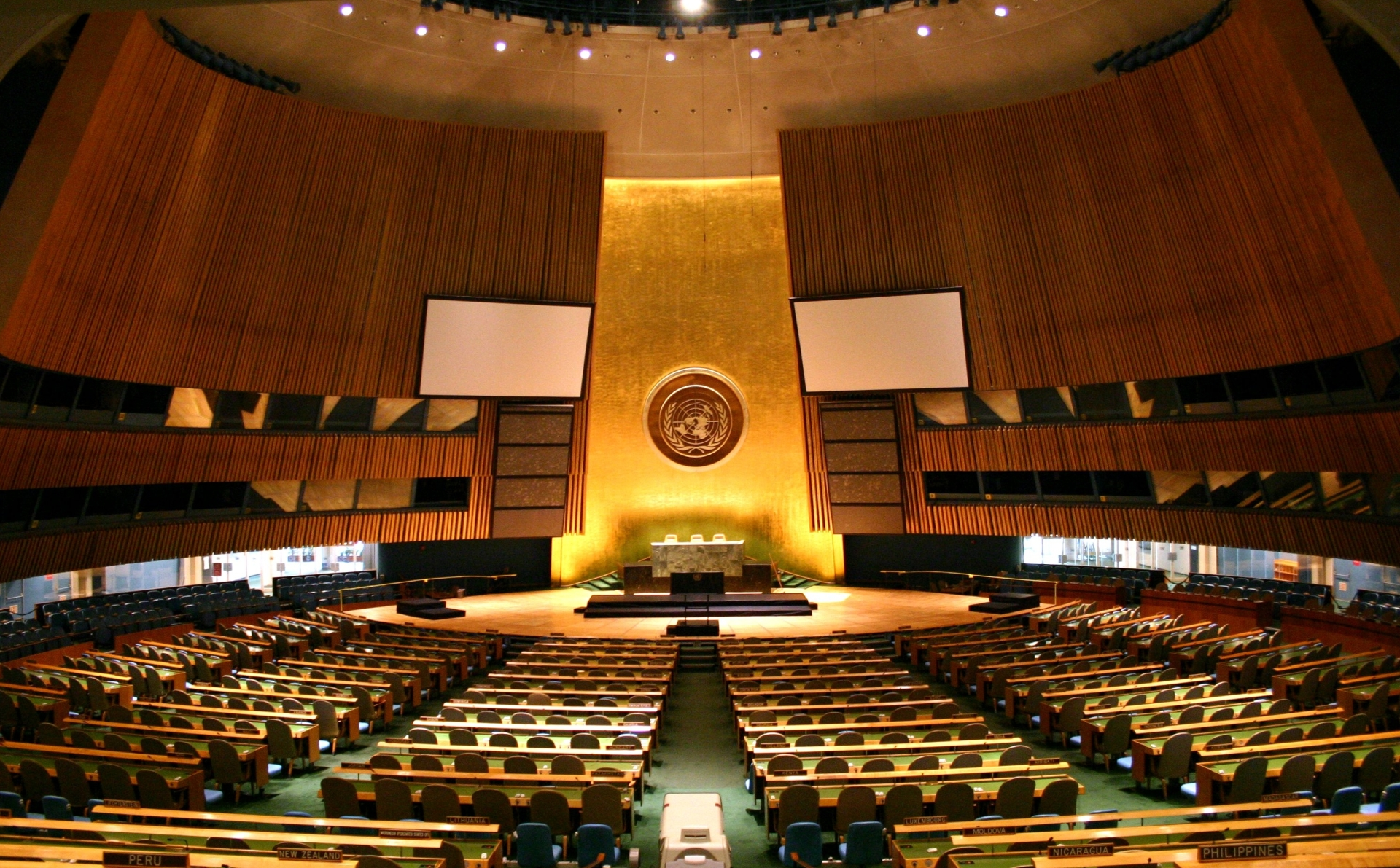
The General Assembly Hall at United Nations Headquarters in New York

Keir Starmer speaking at the Permanent Joint Headquarters, Northwood, on 22 May 2025, the day the treaty was signed

Navin Ramgoolam, Prime Minister of Mauritius, who signed the treaty for Mauritius

Location of Île du Coin in Peros Banhos

Timeline of the Chagos Archipelago from 1977
Date	Event
1977–1978	The £650,000, with accrued interest, was finally paid out in cash to 595 Ilois families in Mauritius, including 169 families who had come to Mauritius before 1965; nothing was paid to those in Seychelles.
July 1980	The Organisation of African Unity adopted a resolution demanding that Diego Garcia be "unconditionally returned to Mauritius".
9 October 1980	Having generally not raised the question in public since independence, Mauritius, through its Prime Minister, told the General Assembly that the BIOT should be disbanded and the territory restored to Mauritius.
7 July 1982	The United Kingdom and Mauritius agreed that the United Kingdom would pay £4 million, ex gratia and without admission of liability, in full and final settlement of the claims of the islanders who had gone to Mauritius.
7 July 1982	The Mauritian Parliament amended the Interpretation and General Clauses Act to include "the Chagos Archipelago, including Diego Garcia" in the legal definition of Mauritius.
1983	Chagossians in Mauritius founded the Chagos Refugees Group; one of its founders, Olivier Bancoult, told the High Court that it was set up "as an Ilois group for Ilois, because they felt betrayed by Mauritian politicians and intellectuals". (Note: Another witness in Chagos Islanders v Attorney General, Mrs Alexis, said that the group was founded in 1980.)
1992	The Constitution of Mauritius, as amended with effect from 1992, defined Mauritius as including the Chagos Archipelago and Diego Garcia.
3 November 2000	In Bancoult (No 1), brought by the Chagossian Olivier Bancoult, the High Court quashed the provision of the 1971 Ordinance excluding the islanders; the government did not appeal, and its Immigration Ordinance 2000, made the same day, allowed Chagossians to enter and live on the islands other than Diego Garcia.
21 May 2002	The British Overseas Territories Act 2002 came into force, under which British overseas territories citizens, other than those connected only with the Sovereign Base Areas of Akrotiri and Dhekelia, became British citizens, as did people born between 26 April 1969 and 1 January 1983 to mothers who were citizens of the United Kingdom and Colonies by birth in the British Indian Ocean Territory.
10 June 2004	Two Orders in Council made under the royal prerogative, the British Indian Ocean Territory (Constitution) Order 2004 and the British Indian Ocean Territory (Immigration) Order 2004, declared that no person had the right of abode in the territory and restored immigration control over all the islands.
22 October 2008	In Bancoult (No 2), the House of Lords allowed the government's appeal by three votes to two, upholding the 2004 Orders.
1 April 2010	The United Kingdom declared a marine protected area around the archipelago.
11 December 2012	The European Court of Human Rights declared inadmissible an application by 1,786 Chagossians, partly because their claims had been settled under the 1982 agreement (Chagos Islanders v United Kingdom).
18 March 2015	In Mauritius v United Kingdom, the arbitral tribunal held that the United Kingdom had breached the Law of the Sea Convention in declaring the marine protected area and that its undertaking to return the archipelago when no longer needed for defence was legally binding.
16 November 2016	The British government decided against resettling the Chagossians "on the grounds of feasibility, defence and security interests, and cost to the British taxpayer", announced a support package of about £40 million, and confirmed that the defence agreements with the United States would continue until 30 December 2036.
22 June 2017	The General Assembly adopted resolution 71/292 by 94 votes to 15, with 65 abstentions, requesting an advisory opinion from the International Court of Justice on the separation of the archipelago from Mauritius. (Note: Paragraph 53 of the advisory opinion gives the date as 23 June 2017; the resolution itself and paragraph 1 of the opinion give 22 June 2017.)
25 February 2019	In its advisory opinion, the court found, by 13 votes to 1, that the decolonisation of Mauritius had not been lawfully completed in 1968 and that the United Kingdom was under an obligation to end its administration of the archipelago "as rapidly as possible".
22 May 2019	The General Assembly adopted resolution 73/295 by 116 votes to 6, with 56 abstentions, affirming that the archipelago "forms an integral part of the territory of Mauritius" and demanding that the United Kingdom withdraw its colonial administration within six months.
28 January 2021	In the Mauritius–Maldives maritime boundary case, a special chamber of the International Tribunal for the Law of the Sea rejected the Maldives' preliminary objections, holding that Mauritius "can be regarded as the coastal State in respect of the Chagos Archipelago" for the purpose of the delimitation.
1 September 2022	The Home Office announced that descendants of Chagossians would be able to apply for British citizenship, without fees, from November, under an amendment to the bill that became the Nationality and Borders Act 2022.
3 November 2022	Following a meeting at the UN General Assembly between the prime ministers Liz Truss and Pravind Jugnauth, the Foreign Secretary, James Cleverly, announced that the United Kingdom and Mauritius would begin negotiations on the exercise of sovereignty over the archipelago.
3 October 2024	The two governments announced a political agreement under which the United Kingdom would agree that Mauritius is sovereign over the archipelago, including Diego Garcia, and would be authorised to exercise Mauritius's sovereign rights over Diego Garcia for an initial 99 years; the US President, Joe Biden, applauded the agreement.
22 May 2025	After an out-of-hours injunction obtained by a Chagossian, Bertrice Pompe, was discharged around noon, the prime ministers Keir Starmer and Navin Ramgoolam signed the Agreement concerning the Chagos Archipelago including Diego Garcia, under which the United Kingdom accepts that Mauritius is sovereign over the whole archipelago, including Diego Garcia, and Mauritius authorises the United Kingdom to exercise sovereign rights over Diego Garcia for an initial 99 years.
December 2025	Chagossians in the United Kingdom opposed to the transfer formed a "government-in-exile" and, after a poll to which about 1,300 responded, chose Misley Mandarin as interim "first minister" (Chagossian Government-in-Exile).
16 February 2026	Four Chagossians led by Mandarin, accompanied by the former MP Adam Holloway, landed on Île du Coin in Peros Banhos in protest against the transfer.
31 March 2026	In R (Mandarin), the territory's Supreme Court quashed section 9 of the 2004 Constitution Order and the removal notices served on the four, staying its orders pending an appeal.
29 April 2026	The parliamentary session ended without the implementing bill completing its passage, the government having told the Commons on 13 April that a change in the US President's position had made it "impossible to agree at political level" an update to the 1966 exchange of notes needed for ratification.
October 2026	The treaty had been signed but had not entered into force, and a Foreign Office minister told the House of Lords on 13 October that an agreement with Mauritius "must protect UK interests and command US support" and that the government would "return to the Bill in due course".
4 November 2026	The British and Mauritian prime ministers, Andy Burnham and Navin Ramgoolam, met at the Commonwealth Heads of Government Meeting in Antigua and agreed "to work on a shared plan to make further progress by the end of the year".

== See also ==
- History of Mauritius
- History of Seychelles
- History of the Maldives
- Outer islands of Mauritius
- Sega tambour Chagos

== Sources ==
=== Court and tribunal decisions ===
- R v Secretary of State for the Foreign and Commonwealth Office, ex parte Bancoult, EWHC (Admin) 413 (High Court (Divisional Court) 3 November 2000).
- R (Bancoult) v Secretary of State for Foreign and Commonwealth Affairs (No 2), UKHL 61 (House of Lords 22 October 2008).
- R (Bancoult No 2) v Secretary of State for Foreign and Commonwealth Affairs, UKSC 35 (Supreme Court 29 June 2016).
- "Cause list, 15–17 July 2026: HM Commissioner for the British Indian Ocean Territory v The King (on the application of Mandarin & Ors), [2026] BIOT CA (Civ) 1" (PDF). British Indian Ocean Territory Court of Appeal. 2026.
- "Notice of judgment hand down: His Majesty's Commissioner for the British Indian Ocean Territory v The King (on the application of Mandarin & Ors), [2026] BIOT CA (Civ) 1" (PDF). British Indian Ocean Territory Court of Appeal. 4 November 2026.
- Chagos Islanders v Attorney General and HM BIOT Commissioner, EWHC (QB) 2222 (High Court 9 October 2003).
- Chagos Islanders v United Kingdom, Application no. 35622/04 (European Court of Human Rights 11 December 2012).
- R (Hoareau and Bancoult) v Secretary of State for Foreign and Commonwealth Affairs, EWCA Civ 1010 (Court of Appeal 30 July 2020).
- Legal Consequences of the Separation of the Chagos Archipelago from Mauritius in 1965, Advisory Opinion (PDF). I.C.J. Reports 2019. International Court of Justice. 25 February 2019. p. 95.
- Dispute concerning delimitation of the maritime boundary between Mauritius and Maldives in the Indian Ocean (Mauritius/Maldives), Judgment (PDF). International Tribunal for the Law of the Sea. 28 April 2023.
- Dispute concerning delimitation of the maritime boundary between Mauritius and Maldives in the Indian Ocean (Mauritius/Maldives), Preliminary Objections, Judgment (PDF). ITLOS Reports 2020–2021. International Tribunal for the Law of the Sea. 28 January 2021. p. 17.
- Kateka, James; Wolfrum, Rüdiger (18 March 2015). Dissenting and Concurring Opinion of Judge James Kateka and Judge Rüdiger Wolfrum. Permanent Court of Arbitration.
- R (Mandarin and others) v HM Commissioner for the British Indian Ocean Territory: Order (Supreme Court of the British Indian Ocean Territory 31 March 2026), Text.
- R (Mandarin and others) v HM Commissioner for the British Indian Ocean Territory (Supreme Court of the British Indian Ocean Territory 31 March 2026), Text.
- Memorial of the Republic of Mauritius. Vol. I. Permanent Court of Arbitration. 1 August 2012.
- Reply of the Republic of Mauritius. Vol. I. Permanent Court of Arbitration. 18 November 2013.
- Written Comments of the Republic of Mauritius (PDF). Vol. I. International Court of Justice. 15 May 2018.
- Written Statement of the Republic of Mauritius (PDF). Vol. I. International Court of Justice. 1 March 2018.
- In the Matter of the Chagos Marine Protected Area Arbitration (Mauritius v. United Kingdom): Award (PDF). Permanent Court of Arbitration. 18 March 2015.
- R (Pompe) v Secretary of State for Foreign, Commonwealth and Development Affairs; R (Mandarin) v Secretary of State for Foreign, Commonwealth and Development Affairs, EWHC (Admin) 529 (High Court 10 March 2026).
- Counter-Memorial of the United Kingdom. Permanent Court of Arbitration. 15 July 2013.
- Rejoinder Submitted by the United Kingdom. Permanent Court of Arbitration. 17 March 2014.
- Written Comments of the United Kingdom (PDF). International Court of Justice. 15 May 2018.
- Written Statement of the United Kingdom (PDF). International Court of Justice. 15 February 2018.
- Written Statement of the United States of America (PDF). International Court of Justice. 1 March 2018.

=== United Nations documents ===
- Committee on the Elimination of Racial Discrimination (2 December 2025). Decision 1 (2025): Mauritius and the United Kingdom (early warning and urgent action procedure, INT/CERD/EWU/11263), advance unedited version (Report). Office of the United Nations High Commissioner for Human Rights.
- "Agreement between Mauritius and the UK fails to guarantee rights of Chagossians, say UN experts" (Press release). Office of the United Nations High Commissioner for Human Rights. 10 June 2025.
- "Sega tambour Chagos". Intangible Cultural Heritage. UNESCO. 2019.
- United Nations General Assembly (22 June 2017). Official Records, Seventy-first session, 88th plenary meeting, Thursday, 22 June 2017 (A/71/PV.88) (Report). United Nations.
- United Nations General Assembly (22 May 2019). Official Records, Seventy-third session, 83rd plenary meeting, Wednesday, 22 May 2019, 10 a.m. (A/73/PV.83) (Report). United Nations.
- United Nations General Assembly (22 June 2017). Resolution adopted by the General Assembly on 22 June 2017: 71/292. Request for an advisory opinion of the International Court of Justice on the legal consequences of the separation of the Chagos Archipelago from Mauritius in 1965 (A/RES/71/292) (Report). United Nations.
- United Nations General Assembly (24 May 2019). Resolution adopted by the General Assembly on 22 May 2019: 73/295. Advisory opinion of the International Court of Justice on the legal consequences of the separation of the Chagos Archipelago from Mauritius in 1965 (A/RES/73/295) (Report). United Nations.

=== Treaties and official documents ===
- Memorandum of U.K./U.S. London Discussions: U.S. Defence Interests in the Indian Ocean (PDF). 27 February 1964. TNA FCO 31/3437 – via ICJ Annex 25.
- Biden, Joe (3 October 2024). "Statement on the Agreement Between Mauritius and the United Kingdom on the Status of the Chagos Archipelago". The American Presidency Project.
- "History". British Indian Ocean Territory Administration.
- "Remembrance Day 2019". British Indian Ocean Territory Administration. 11 November 2019.
- "British Overseas Territories Act 2002 (c. 8)". legislation.gov.uk.
- "The British Overseas Territories Act 2002 (Commencement) Order 2002 (SI 2002/1252)". legislation.gov.uk. 1 May 2002.
- Duncan, Alan (16 November 2016). "Update on the British Indian Ocean Territory (HCWS260)". UK Parliament: Written questions, answers and statements.
- Duncan, Alan (30 April 2019). "British Indian Ocean Territory (HCWS1528)". UK Parliament: Written questions, answers and statements.
- "Diego Garcia Military Base and British Indian Ocean Territory Bill". Hansard, House of Commons. 13 April 2026.
- "Diego Garcia Military Base and British Indian Ocean Territory Bill". Hansard, House of Lords. 13 October 2026.
- "Topical Questions". Hansard, House of Commons. 27 October 2026.
- Home Office (2022). "Nationality and Borders Bill: Chagossian nationality factsheet". GOV.UK.
- Newton, Robert (1964). Report on the Anglo-American Survey in the Indian Ocean (PDF) (Report). TNA CO 1036/1332 – via Memorial of Mauritius, Annex 2.
- "PM meetings with world leaders at CHOGM" (Press release). Prime Minister's Office, 10 Downing Street. 5 November 2026.
- Rammell, Bill (15 June 2004). "British Indian Ocean Territory (written ministerial statement)". Hansard, House of Commons. pp. 32WS–34WS.
- Permanent Mission of the United Kingdom to the United Nations (19 January 2023). Note No. 004/23 to the Secretary-General, with the Written Ministerial Statement of 3 November 2022 (PDF) (Report). United Nations.
- Agreement between the Government of the United Kingdom of Great Britain and Northern Ireland and the Government of the Republic of Mauritius concerning the Chagos Archipelago including Diego Garcia (CS Mauritius No.1/2025, CP 1334) (Report). Foreign, Commonwealth and Development Office. 22 May 2025.
- "UK and Mauritius joint statement, 3 October 2024" (Press release). Foreign, Commonwealth and Development Office. 3 October 2024.
- Exchange of notes constituting an agreement supplementing the above-mentioned agreement, concerning a United States naval support facility on Diego Garcia, British Indian Ocean Territory and replacing the supplementary agreement of 24 October 1972. London, 25 February 1976 (PDF). United Nations Treaty Series. Vol. 1018. United Nations. 1976. pp. 372–381.
- Exchange of notes constituting an agreement amending the above-mentioned agreement, as supplemented. London, 22 June 1976 (PDF). United Nations Treaty Series. Vol. 1032. United Nations. 1977. pp. 323–324.
- Exchange of notes constituting an agreement between the Government of the United Kingdom of Great Britain and Northern Ireland and the Government of the United States of America concerning the availability for defence purposes of the British Indian Ocean Territory. London, 30 December 1966 (No. 8737) (PDF). United Nations Treaty Series. Vol. 603. United Nations. 1967. pp. 273–290. Also published as UK Treaty Series No. 15 (1967), Cmnd 3231; 18 UST 28; TIAS 6196.
- Exchange of notes constituting an agreement supplementing the above-mentioned agreement concerning a limited United States naval communications facility on Diego Garcia, British Indian Ocean Territory. London, 24 October 1972 (PDF). United Nations Treaty Series. Vol. 866. United Nations. 1973. pp. 302–307.

=== Books and journals ===
- Ballgobin, Dehoutee Vina (2014). "Le patrimoine musical de la République de Maurice : L'Archipel des Chagos (1900–1950)". Revue historique de l'océan Indien (in French) (11): 600–615.
- Edis, Richard (1993). Peak of Limuria: The Story of Diego Garcia (PDF). London: Bellew Publishing. ISBN 1-85725-070-2 – via Written Statement of the Republic of Mauritius (ICJ), vol. IV, Annex 136 (extracts).
- Hendry, Ian; Dickson, Susan (2011). British Overseas Territories Law (PDF). Oxford: Hart Publishing – via Written Statement of the Republic of Mauritius (ICJ), vol. V, Annex 157.
- Mücke, Hellmuth von (1917). The "Emden". Translated by Helene S. White. Boston: Ritter & Company.
- Ryan, Vincent W. (1864). Mauritius and Madagascar: Journals of an Eight Years' Residence in the Diocese of Mauritius, and of a Visit to Madagascar. London: Seeley, Jackson, and Halliday.
- Stoddart, D. R. (1971). "Settlement and development of Diego Garcia". Atoll Research Bulletin (149). Smithsonian Institution: 209–217.
- Vine, David (2009). Island of Shame: The Secret History of the U.S. Military Base on Diego Garcia (PDF). Princeton University Press. ISBN 978-0-691-13869-5 – via Written Statement of the Republic of Mauritius (ICJ), vol. V, Annex 151 (extracts).

=== News and other sources ===
- AFP (18 February 2026). "Chagos islanders say they refuse to leave in protest against UK handover". Arab News.
- Arjanee, Ameerah (2 October 2026). "UK-Mauritius Chagos sovereignty deal stalls amid fears of further delays". Al Jazeera English.
- Badshah, Nadeem (17 February 2026). "Four Chagossians return to islands in attempt to stop British transfer to Mauritius". The Guardian.
- Chambers, Bala (22 October 2021). "Will Britain give citizenship rights to all Chagos islanders?". Al Jazeera English.
- Baldwin, Clive; Human Rights Watch (15 February 2023). "That's When the Nightmare Started": UK and US Forced Displacement of the Chagossians and Ongoing Colonial Crimes (PDF) (Report). Human Rights Watch. ISBN 979-8-88708-029-1.
- "Ile Maurice: «Qui sont les plus légitimes ? Les déracinés ou les troisièmes générations nées au pays ?»". L'Express (in French). 8 November 2025 – via allAfrica.
- "Mauritius 3966". Legacies of British Slavery. University College London.
- Mallinder, Lorraine (11 February 2025). "'Tug of war': Chagos Islands deal tearing families apart in Mauritius". Al Jazeera English.
- Martin, Daniel (16 December 2025). "Chagos Islanders defy Starmer by forming government in exile". The Telegraph. Archived from the original on 17 December 2025.
- "Chagossians take struggle for justice to the heart of British government". Minority Rights Group International. 22 November 2004.
- "A new history book on Chagos". News on Sunday. Le Défi Media Group. 4 March 2017.
- Peerthum, Satyendra (16 October 2018). "The Story of the Settlement of Diego Garcia and the Chagos Archipelago". Le Mauricien.
- "Chagossian activists challenge legality of new bilateral agreement". Seychelles Nation. 10 June 2025.
- Stacey, Kiran (5 November 2026). "Burnham wants to 'recast' Chagos Islands deal after US resistance". The Guardian.
- Syal, Rajeev (1 September 2022). "Evicted Chagos Islanders' descendants to get British citizenship". The Guardian.
- Wenban-Smith, Nigel (31 January 2007). "The Conception: a 450-year-old mystery" (PDF). Factsheet 002. Chagos Conservation Trust.
- Wenban-Smith, Nigel (11 January 2008). "History of the Chagos Archipelago" (PDF). Factsheet 058. Chagos Conservation Trust.
