= Jessy Marcelin =

Chagossian musician and activist

Jessy Marcelin (born 1934) is a Chagossian musician and activist who was born in the Chagos Islands and forced to leave as part of Britain's displacement of the Chagossian people.

Marcelin was born in 1934 on the atoll of Peros Banhos, part of the Chagos Archipelago.

In 1970, she was forced to leave Chagos during the expulsion of the Chagossians from the archipelago, as the United Kingdom pursued the construction of a military base in what is now formally known as British Indian Ocean Territory. Marcelin was pregnant at the time of her expulsion; she is a mother of 14 children, two of whom are buried back on her native atoll.

Having settled in the Seychelles, she began composing music nostalgic for her former home, including the song "Payanke dan lizur" ("Tropicbird in the light") and "Bato ale laba" ("The ship goes over there"). Her music is written in her home islands' sega style.

She also became active in Chagossian exile groups, primarily the Seychelles Chagossian Committee, a partner organization of the Chagos Refugee Group, eventually becoming a veteran member of the movement. At a 2008 protest in front of the House of Lords, she said, "We want the Americans and their military base off the islands so we can live in peace in our homeland. And we want compensation for the 40 years of suffering in exile."
