= Sega tambour Chagos =

Genre of music from Mauritius

- Stylistic origins: Sega
- Cultural origins: Mauritian music

Sega tambour Chagos
- UNESCO Intangible Cultural Heritage
- Country: Mauritius
- Reference: 01490
- Region: Africa

Inscription history
- Inscription: 2019 (14th session)
- List: Need of Urgent safeguarding

Islands of the Republic of Mauritius labelled in black; Chagos Archipelago is claimed by Mauritius

Sega tambour Chagos is one of the types of Sega music of Mauritius, with origins in the Chagos Archipelago. It is sung in the Chagossian creole language of the islands.

== History ==
Chagos is part of the British Indian Ocean Territory and is claimed by Mauritius. Diego Garcia, the largest and most southerly of the islands, is inhabited. It contains a joint UK-US naval support facility. Between 1967 and 1973, former agricultural workers, earlier residents in the islands, were relocated primarily to Mauritius, but also to the Seychelles.

== Instruments ==
Instruments used in Chagos Sega include:

- Tambour, a large, circular, percussive instrument that provides the basic rhythm
- Whistle
- Triangle
- rattle

== See also ==
- Music of Mauritius
- Sega
- Jessy Marcelin
