= Music of Mauritius =

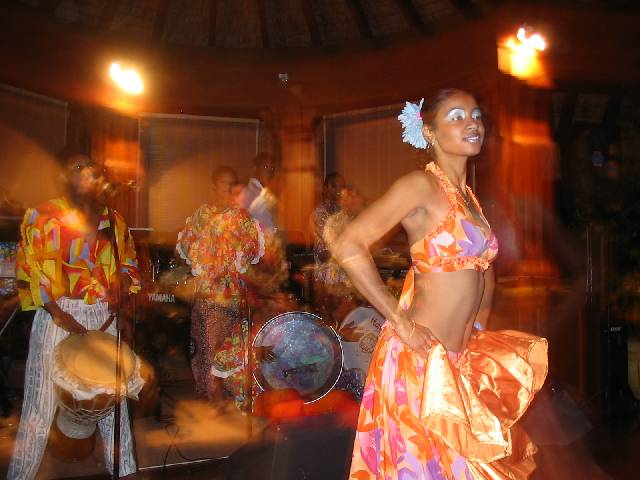
A woman performs the Sega in Pointe-aux-Piments, Mauritius

Mauritius has 2 genres of music that originate from the Island. The traditional music of Mauritius which is known as Sega music (includes Modern Sega and Sega typique) and also Seggae music. Other genres also exist like Reggae, Ragga, Zouk, Soukous and; Indian music like Bhojpuri songs as well as Bollywood-themed Hindustani songs are also popular, but these genres do not originate from Mauritius. Despite famous local singers such as Kaya, who successfully combined Reggae music with Sega music to create Mauritian Seggae. Well-known traditional sega singers from Mauritius include Ti Frére, Marlene Ravaton, Serge Lebrasse, Michel Legris and Fanfan.

Musicians in Mauritius are quite talented and through the years Mauritian music has evolved to international standards. There are many jazz and blues artists around the island.

Sega, seggae and reggae remain the most popular produced music in Mauritius amongst Mauritian artists. Based on popular internet connection there are evolved artists performing R&B, hip hop, soul, dubstep, club, techno and other popular music styles.

The Sega is usually sung in Creole, the Mauritian mother tongue. Some singers planned to also publish an English version of their Sega songs but later abstained in order to preserve the uniqueness and cultural richness of the local music of Mauritius.

The original instruments - the “Ravanne”, “Triangle”, the “Maravanne” and the traditional guitar - are often replaced by more conventional orchestra instruments. However, all along the coastal fishing villages, the traditional instruments are still being used.

By 2015, some of the popular Mauritian sega artists were Alain Ramanisum, Desiré Francois and Ziakazom. Other top known Mauritian artists are Kaka Zulu and The Prophecy.

== Sega ==
The sega is the most popular form of music and dance of Mauritius. The traditional instrumentation includes the ravanne, a goat-skin covered drum, the triangle, and the maravanne.

It is not clear when sega originated. Most claim that sega music and dance origins are found in the slavery epoch, most probably started in Mauritius at the end of 17th century to early 18th century during the French colonisation of the island, but research has not established the exact date. Nowadays, Mauritians sing sega as a form of self-expression. Rural forms of music include Mauritian Bhojpuri songs, kawals, that date from the epoch of indentured labour and remained popular in Mauritian villages but are now fast disappearing.

There have been many groups that have been formed that fuse these two as well as others that have a deeper connection to the roots of each genre. Cassiya is an example of a group that has become popular not only in Mauritius but also in the neighboring islands such as Reunion. Their single "Mo fami Peser" gives an idea of how life has evolved for the black indentured laborer post-slavery. It tells about how life as a fisherman becomes more difficult as the seas become more polluted and even though they tried to find a normal city job, they still prefer peaceful life of a fisherman.

== Asian music in Mauritius ==
Indian immigrants have brought their own styles of music and dance, along with instruments like the sitar and tabla. Mauritian-based Bhojpuri music has also been popular with people of Indian-descent, but is now gaining mainstream appeal through the work of artists such as 'Neeraj Gupta Mudhoo' or The Bhojpuri Boys. Their fusion of Bhojpuri lyrics, sega beats, and more traditional Indian as well as Bollywood-style music has gained popularity among Mauritians, "Langaroo" being one of their famous songs. Chinese immigrants have also infused Mauritian culture with elements from Chinese musical traditions.

== Rock music in Mauritius ==
Rock music has recently become very popular in Mauritius, many bands have become famous, including XBreed Supersoul, Feedback, Skeptikal, Kelp, Reborn Orlean which is nearer to metal/hard rock. In 2018, with the advent of the yearly Maytal, Underground Rock Festival and Decibel Assault initiative, many other bands such as Cryptic Carnage, Apostrophe, Ryoshi, Devived, UnMind, Revolt and King of None have started to get mainstream recognition.

== Musical groups and singers ==
A list of notable musical groups and singers from Mauritius.

=== Groups ===
- 666Armada
- Abaim
- Bhojpuri Boys
- Blackmen Bluz
- Blakkayo
- Cassiya
- Cardiac Rage
- Damien Elisa
- Don Panik
- Double K
- Evolozik
- Gangsta Beach
- Grup Latanier
- Jah Mike
- Kadanse Tropical
- Kreol Jazz Pioneers
- Steel Grooving band
- Mauritian All Stars
- Nas-T Black
- Natty Jah
- Otentik Street Brothers (OSB)
- Reborn Orleans
- Skeptikal
- Solda Kazbad
- Supa Sane
- The Prophecy
- Versaya
- Wake Up Team (WU TEAM)
- Xbreed Supersoul
- Zenfant L'ocean
- ZBS
- Zotsa

=== Singers ===
- Alain Ramanisum
- Alphonse Ravaton (Ti-Frère)
- Bam Cootayen
- Berger Agathe
- Bigg Frankii
- Blakkayo
- Brinda
- Bruno Raya
- Clarel Armelle
- Clarisse Sisters
- Claudio Veeraragoo
- Coulouce
- Dagger Killa
- Dave Dario
- Denis Azor
- Denis Claude Gaspard
- Desiré François
- Didier Clarel
- Eric Triton
- Fanfan
- Frico Labelle
- Gassen Singaron (Cozé Mamé)
- Jasmine Toulouse
- Jean Claude Gaspard
- Havana Brown
- Isabelle de Villecourt
- Kenjee Kennedy
- Kaya
- King
- Laura Beg
- Laval Disco
- Linzy Bacbotte
- Mamie Kloune
- Marki Evolution
- Mario Armel
- Mario Ramsamy
- Mario Justin
- Mary Jane Gaspard
- Menwar
- Michel Legris
- Mr Love (Ludovic Lamarque)
- Natty Jah
- Nancy Derougère
- Negro Pou La Vi
- Neeraj Gupta Mudhoo
- Nitin Chinien
- Nitish Joganah
- Ras Natty Baby
- Renel Trapu
- Richard Beaugendre
- Sandra Mayotte
- Serge Lebrasse
- Siven Chinien
- Sky To Be (Jean Patrice Kevin Dina)
- Sona Noyan
- Suchita Ramdin
- Sylvain Kaleecharan
- System R
- Tian Corentin
- Vishnu Carombayeni
- Yoan Catherine
- ZENO
- Ziakazom
- Zonatan
- Zulu

== See also ==
- Sega music
- Seggae
- Santé engagé
- Category:Mauritian singers
- Category:Mauritian musicians
- Category:Mauritian musical instruments
