= Lapel lorizon =

Lapel Lorizon

Studio album by Grup Latanier
- Released: 1985
- Recorded: 1985
- Genre: Santé engagé

Grup Latanier chronology
| Nuvo simé (1981) | Lapel Lorizon (1985) | Rapor Lepep (1987) |

Lapel Lorizon is the second studio album by Mauritian committed song (santé engazé) band Grup Latanier, released in 1985.

It was originally released in 1985 on compact audio cassette. A CD version of the album has later been released in 2004.

== Overview ==
After the immense popular success of their first studio Album Krapo Kriyé, Grup Latanier took four years to write and compose the songs of their second studio album. This album features several songs from Bruno Mooken, who joined the Group after 1981.

== Track listing ==
The list of the songs of the album as shown below is not necessarily in the order in which it was originally released.

1. Ti Bato
2. Ekute
3. Lete ek Liver
4. Nu Kalou
5. Lapriyer
6. Lavi enn grand papa
7. Gandhi
8. Spektater
9. Ki Lavenir
10. Dan l'Afrik
