= Latanier =

Latanier may refer to

- Grup Latanier, a musical group from Mauritius
- Latanier palm, a common name for several species of palm trees
