= 2020 Mauritian protests =

2020 Mauritian oil spill protests

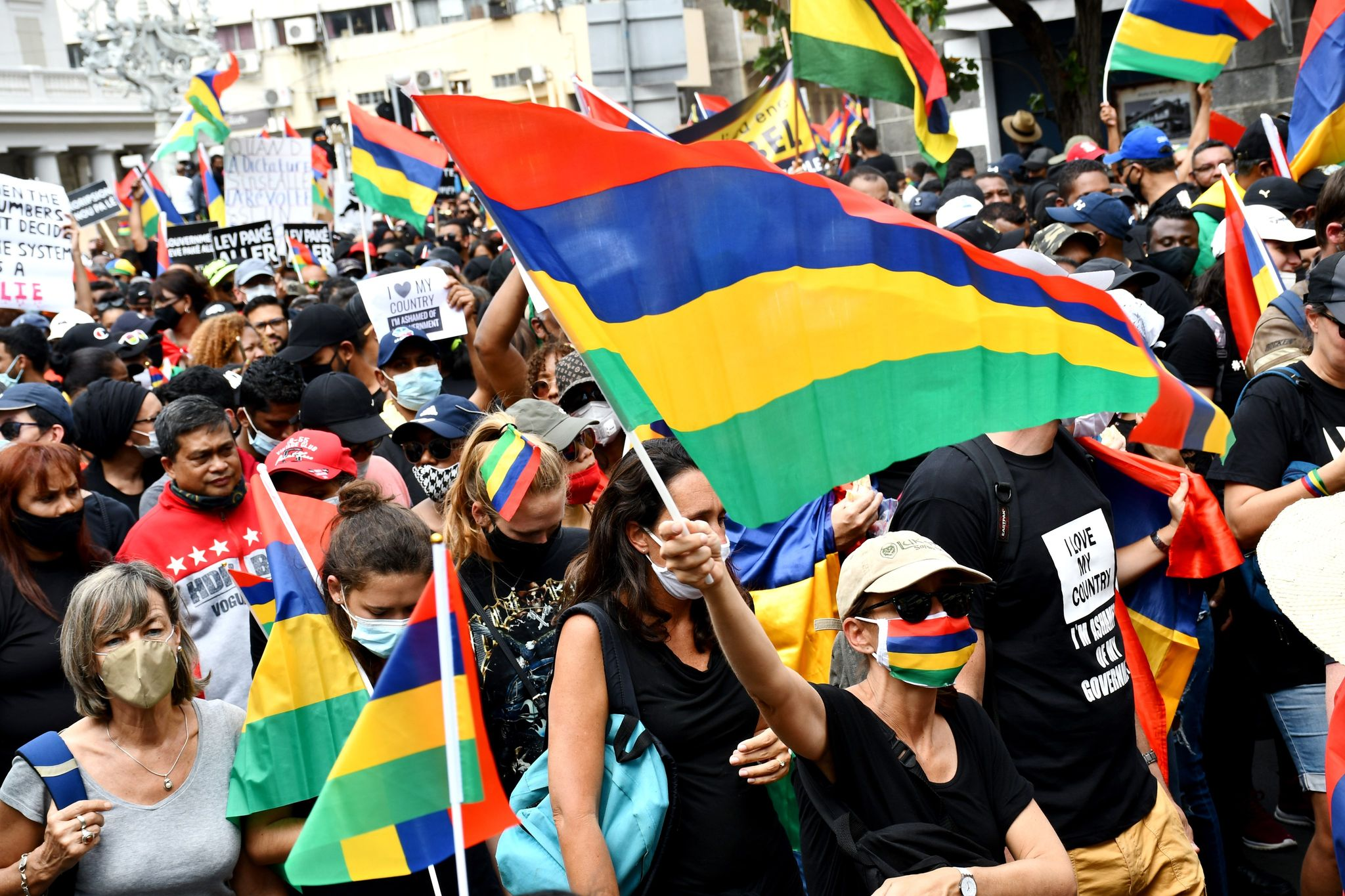
Port Louis protest (31 August 2020)

The 2020 protests in Mauritius were a series of large rallies and nonviolent demonstrations held in Mauritius following the MV Wakashio oil spill. Protests came in three waves of marches on 29–31 August, 12–13 September and September 14–15. Demonstrator’s main demanded that the Mauritian government launch an inquiry into the cause of the oil spill.

== Protests ==
Thousands people marched to the capital of Mauritius in protest of the government’s response to the oil spill, calling on an investigation into the spill. Protesters also chanted and protested with banners and placards in other towns. Demonstrators called for an uprising against the spill, asking the government to respond to the spill. Protesters denounced the report of dozens of dolphins dead, calling also for an investigation into the deaths of the dolphins.

On 12 September, thousands led protest actions and rallies in support of protesters on the streets. Street protests and opposition marches denounced the oil spill, calling on an investigation into the tanker split and 1000 tons of fuel that spilled into the water. Thousands called for probes and justice over the confusions over the spill of fuel into the ocean. Strikers used whistles, honked horns and chanted slogans against who government, calling on it to resign.

== See also ==
- 1999 Mauritian riots
