= Cassiya =

Sega music group from Mauritius

Cassiya is one of the most popular sega music groups from Mauritius founded in 1988.

They were most popular in the mid-1990s. Their influence was not limited to their home island; they also influenced sega musicians on Réunion. They formed their own record label, Cassiya Productions. Their 1996 album Cassiya II "balanced the hypnotic and excitable percussive rhythms of the ravanne with an underlying mournful tone, reminding its listeners of the plight of their ancestors".

== Discography ==
- Album d'or (Cassiya Productions, 2000)
- Cassiya, la Suite (2001, includes the single "Le Morne", named after the mountain)

== Members ==
- Alain La Fleur
- Désiré François
- Gérard Louis
- Rico Clair
- Bruno François
- Damien Elisa (left group)
- Alain Ramanisum (left group for a solo career)
- Silvio Ravina (died in 2005)
- Eddy Armel (died in 2021)

== Former member ==
- Alain Ramanisum (now has a solo career)
