= Sega (genre) =

Music genre of Mauritius, Seychelles and Reunion island

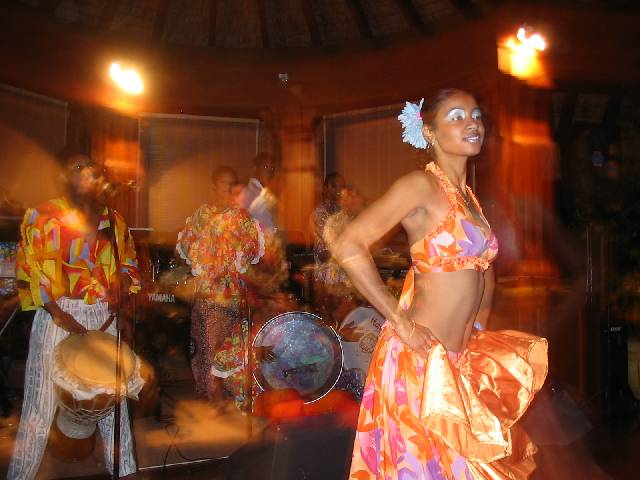
- Group performing the sega at Pointe-aux-Piments, Mauritius
- Stylistic origins: African music (most notable Malagasy music) and Mozambique
- Cultural origins: Mauritius, Reunion, Madagascar

Fusion genres
- Santé engagé, seggae

Regional scenes
- Mauritius, Rodrigues, Reunion, Seychelles

Other topics
- Maloya, Moutya

Traditional Mauritian Sega
- UNESCO Intangible Cultural Heritage
- Country: Mauritius
- Reference: 01003
- Region: Africa

Inscription history
- Inscription: 2014 (9th session)
- List: Representative

Sega (French: séga) is one of the major music genres of Mauritius and Reunion. It is a complete performance art, involving music, story-telling and traditional dance. Musically, the most modern forms common in Mauritius are its fusion genre seggae and bhojpuri variations, whilst Reunion also features maloya, the latter being much closer to the older, typical music influences originating from Madagascar. The variety of different sega forms is reflected in the multi-ethnic populous of the indigenous population of Mauritius.

Sega (traditional Mauritian sega, sega tambour Chagos, sega tambour of Rodrigues Island) has been included in UNESCO's Intangible Cultural Heritage lists.

Sega has its roots in the music of slaves as well as their descendants Mauritian Creole people and is usually sung in Mauritian Creole or Reunionese Creole. Sega is also popular on the islands of Agaléga and Rodrigues as well as Seychelles, though the music and dances differ and it is sung in these islands' respective creole languages. In the past, sega music focused on traditional percussion instruments such as the ravanne and the triangle, it was sung to protest against injustices in the Mauritian society, this particular version of sega is known as Santé engagé.

== Description ==
The music's traditional form was largely improvised and intensely emotional and expressed the tribulations of a subjugated, initially enslaved, people. It is primarily music to dance to but was also used for dirges and as part of traditional exorcisms.

=== Instruments ===
Traditional instruments include:

- the maravanne (rattle)
- moutia (hand drum)
- the goatskin drum ravanne
- triangle
- and the bobre (bow).

There is also the tantam, which is a stringed instrument consisting of a gourd with a bow attached, played in time to the drum. Nowadays, electric guitars and keyboards are used.

=== Lyrics ===
The lyrics of modern sega music usually relate to the lives of the inhabitants; they do not usually relate to the musicians' ancestral homeland.

=== Dance ===
Sega is danced without the feet ever leaving the ground. Instead, the rest of the body moves, with an emphasis on the hips and waist. For women this involves the use of large, colourful, circular skirts and short sleeved, sleeveless or off the shoulder tops, baring the midriff (belly), to accentuate their moves. Traditionally, men wear colourful shirts and shorts and straw hats are popular in the ancient styles.

== History ==
=== Origins ===
Sega music originated among the slave populations of Mauritius and Réunion and later spread throughout the Seychelles. It is usually in 6/8 meter and has an associated dance form.

Sega's exact origins outside the islands are unknown. However, it is understood to have Afro-Malagasy roots and be a fusion of African or Malagasy music with European music. The European influence includes folk dance music like polka, waltz and quadrilles.

Gatan Benoit suggested that sega came from Madagascar and Boswell notes there may be a link between sega and famadihana, a Merina death ritual. Arago instead identifies it with (t)chéga from Mozambique. He states that it is similar to the fandango and chica (dance) from Brazil whose origins are in African music from Mozambique and Angola. It was termed "African" by sega musician Jacques Cantin.

=== Place in society ===
Historically, Sega was looked down upon because it was the music of slaves. It was also looked down upon by the Catholic Church, which was not keen on its association with sexuality and alcohol.

Until the Mauritian artist Ti Frère became popular in the 1960s, sega was only played in private places. A particularly big turning point was his performance at the Night of the Sega at Mount Le Morne on 30 October 1964. It is now considered the national music of Mauritius and not restricted by ethnicity.

== Modern varieties ==
Sega is now popular across the islands of Mauritius, Réunion, Seychelles, Comoros, Mayotte and Rodrigues, along with parts of Madagascar. In its modern form, sega is combined with genres like jazz, zouk, and its fusion genre with reggae known as Seggae. Elements of African music have been added to sega since the 1980s.

=== Santé engagé ===
Santé engagé is a genre of Mauritian music which consists of singing protest songs. It is a way to protest against injustices through music. The genre mixes traditional Mauritian sega with Indian influences.

=== Seggae ===
Seggae is a fusion of sega with reggae, a kind of Jamaican popular music that is very popular across sega's range. Seggae musicians include Ras Natty Baby, Sonny Morgan and the man seen as being the founder, Kaya. Kaya, whose real name is Joseph Reginald Topize, was at the height of his career in 1999 when he was found dead in a prison cell. Riots followed soon after causing one of the major social upheavals in Mauritius, termed the 1999 Mauritian riots. Kaya's music is, however, still very popular and has inspired contemporary musicians to expand the Seggae genre.

== Regional varieties ==
=== Réunion ===
In Réunion, sega is relatively slow, and is danced by couples who are not as physically close as on Mauritius. There is some confusion as to the usage of the words maloya and sega. What was called sega in historical accounts from previous centuries is similar to what is nowadays called maloya. The word "sega", on the other hand, is used to describe the fusion genre of the Afro-Malagasy and the European.

=== Rodrigues ===
Traditional Rodriguan sega is Sega tambour, where the drum is more prominent. Sega tambour is considered to be truer to the origins of sega than Mauritian sega, due to Rodrigue's geographical isolation. The accordion groups of Rodrigues, segakordeon, include European folk dance music such as polkas, quadrilles, waltzes and Scottish reels. Rodrigue music is extremely swift compared to other varieties. These sega tambours are sung mostly by women and are danced only by one couple at a time, accompanied by clapping or the use of improvised percussion instruments like table legs and glasses. The accordion was not being played so much by young people but an initiative involving the European Union are giving accordion lessons to young Rodriguans.

=== Seychelles ===
One form of Seychellois sega is called Moutya and is similar to Réunionnais sega. Seychellois music is influenced by Western ballads, and especially country music. Increasingly, Reggae, Rock, hip hop, jazz, electronic dance music, house music and pop style Seychellois music have become popular locally as well as internationally with the wider Seychellois community.

=== Chagos Islands ===
The Chagos Islanders also had their own variety of sega before they were deported from the islands to make way for the American military base Diego Garcia.

== See also ==
- Music of Mauritius
- Seggae
- Santé engagé
