= Malaise =

Feeling of general discomfort

- Other names: Discomfort, uneasiness
- Pronunciation: /məˈleɪz/ mə-LAYZ
- Specialty: Primary care, pediatrics, geriatrics, psychiatry, clinical psychology
- Symptoms: Feeling of uneasiness or discomfort
- Diagnostic method: Based on symptoms
- Differential diagnosis: Pain, anxiety, depression

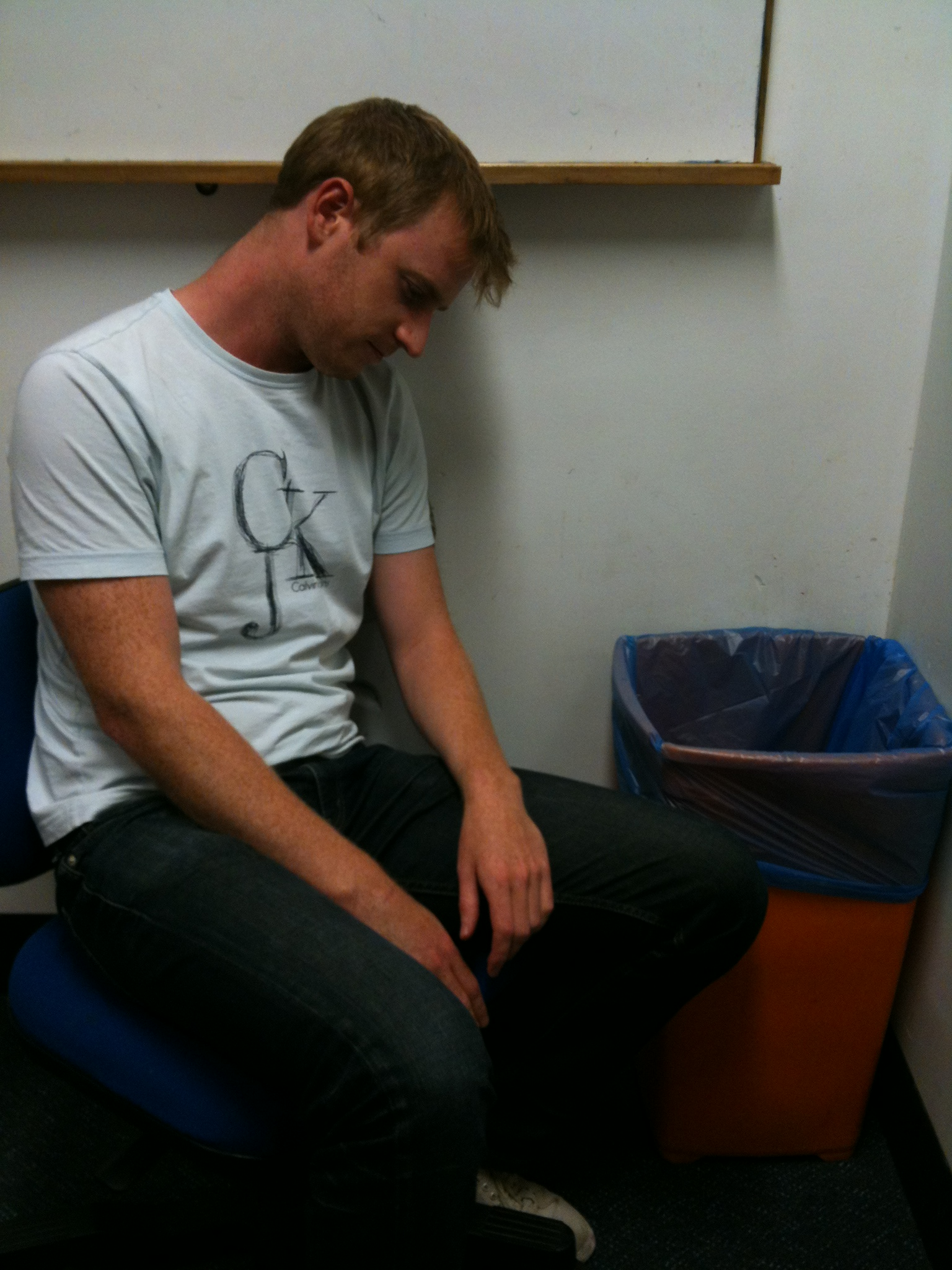
Sufferers of malaise often report a feeling of being unwell.

In medicine, malaise is a feeling of general discomfort, uneasiness or lack of wellbeing and often the first sign of an infection or other disease. It is considered a vague term – describing the state of simply not feeling well. The word has existed in French since at least the 12th century.

The term is often used figuratively in other contexts, in addition to its meaning as a general state of angst or melancholia.

== Cause ==
Malaise is a non-specific symptom and can be present in the slightest ailment, such as an emotion (e.g., causing fainting, a vasovagal response) or hunger (e.g., light hypoglycemia), to more serious conditions (e.g., cancer, stroke, heart attack, internal bleeding).

Malaise expresses a patient's uneasiness that "something is not right" that may need a medical examination to determine the significance.

Malaise is thought to be caused by the activation of an immune response, and the associated pro-inflammatory cytokines.

== See also ==
- Ennui – Emotion of uninterest in surroundings
- Fatigue (medical) – State of tiredness, exhaustion or loss of energy
- Malaise Créole – Social exclusion of Mauritius Creoles
- Nosology – Branch of medicine that deals with classification of diseases
- Post-exertional malaise – Worsening of symptoms with activity
- Prodrome – Premonitory signs or symptoms of disease
- Torpor – State of decreased physiological activity in an animal
