= Malaise Créole =

Social exclusion of Mauritius Creoles

Malaise Créole is a term that was coined in the 1990s to describe the phenomenon of social exclusion of members of the Creole community on the island of Mauritius by the rest of Mauritian society. The literal translation of the term is "Creole Uneasiness".

== Background ==
Ethnographic research amongst Creoles in Mauritius has identified four main facets of the Malaise Créole phenomenon, in addition to the impact of colonialism and slavery:

1. It could be the result of dispossession and physical and psychological violence under slavery, especially as African slaves had to give up their traditions and religion to adopt their masters' religion Roman Catholicism in accordance with the Code Noir. This could explain the fragmented identity and lack of solidarity.

2. Another interpretation of Malaise Créole is that is a social pathology resulting from the lack of a fundamental pre-existing Creole identity.

3. The African heritage and hybridity of Creoles resulted in their destructive tendencies.

4. Lastly Malaise Créole could be considered as a concept which was deployed by political and socio-cultural groups in an attempt to homogenise the very diverse Creole community in order to mobilise them towards a common political goal.

Although the phenomenon dates back to the years of slavery of the 1700s, the Malaise Créole worsened especially in the 1980s, after the uncertainty, mass migration and racial riots around the country's independence in 1968, followed by a reconciliatory alliance between the Labour Party and the PMSD which enabled the economy to recover.

== Manifestation of the phenomenon ==
The 1999 Mauritian riots following the death in custody of popular "seggae" musician Joseph Réginald Topize brought the phenomenon of Malaise Créole to the forefront.

== Independent enquiry and recommendations ==
In 2009 the government of Mauritius instigated the independent Truth and Justice Commission (TJC) to explore the impact of slavery and indentured servitude in Mauritius. It also investigated the dispossession of land and made recommendations for the welfare of descendants of slaves and indentured labourers. The TJC published its report in 2011.
