= Pritam Singh Mattan =

Mauritian politician

Pritam Singh Mattan, born in Mauritius in the village of Bois Cheri, was rather briefly the Chief Executive of Rodrigues Island, Mauritius, from March 5 until August 24, 2010. Prior to this, he was the head of the island's Commission for Tourism since August 2006 and the Director of Rodrigues Tourism Office and Discovery Rodrigues Co Ltd. He worked in different managerial positions in the private and public sector in Mauritius in organizations such as the Compagnie Mauricienne De Textile Ltee, the Grand Port Savanne District Council, the Sugar Insurance Fund Board and the Wastewater Management Authority, before taking employment in Rodrigues with the Rodrigues Regional Assembly. He has a master's degree in Business Administration from the University of Mauritius. He also did his undergraduate studies in Management at the University of Mauritius where he topped his batch and faculty in 1997 and was awarded several bursaries and scholarships. He is also the co-founder of the Revengers Sports Club of Bois Cheri which plays football in the regional football league of Savanne in Mauritius.

Preceded by Jean-Claude Pierre-Louis	Chief Executive of Rodrigues; 2010-September 2010	Succeeded by Joseph Ah-Leong Chang-Siow
