= François Leguat Giant Tortoise and Cave Reserve =

Park and nature reserve on the island of Rodrigues

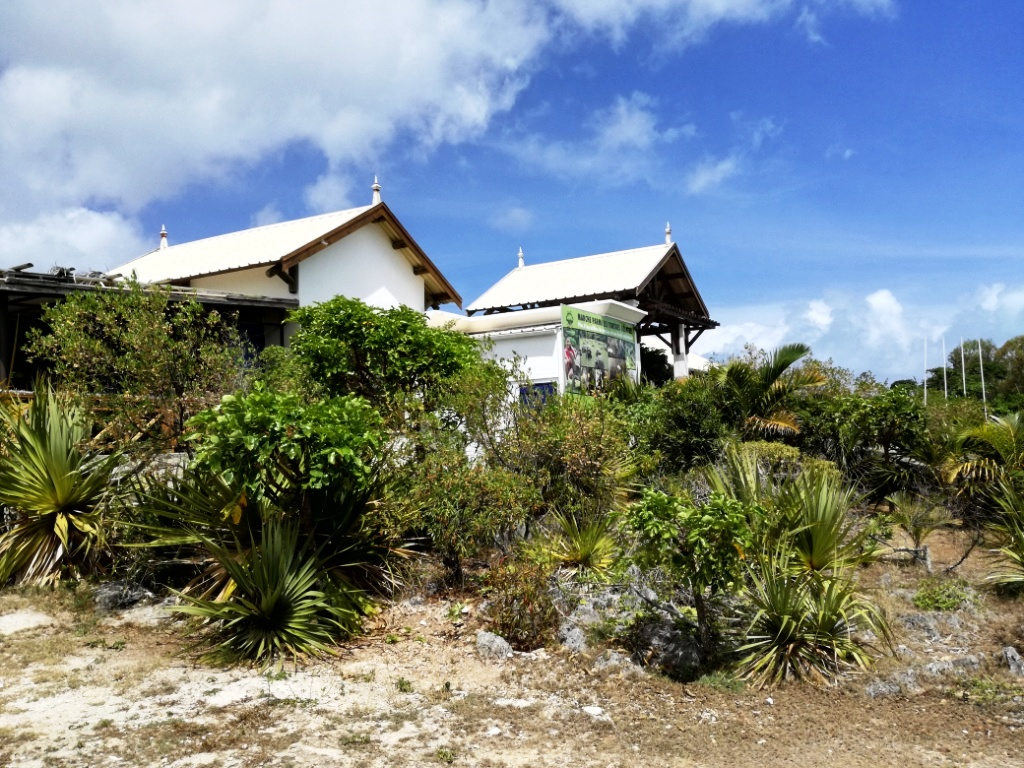
Entrance to the François Leguat Reserve

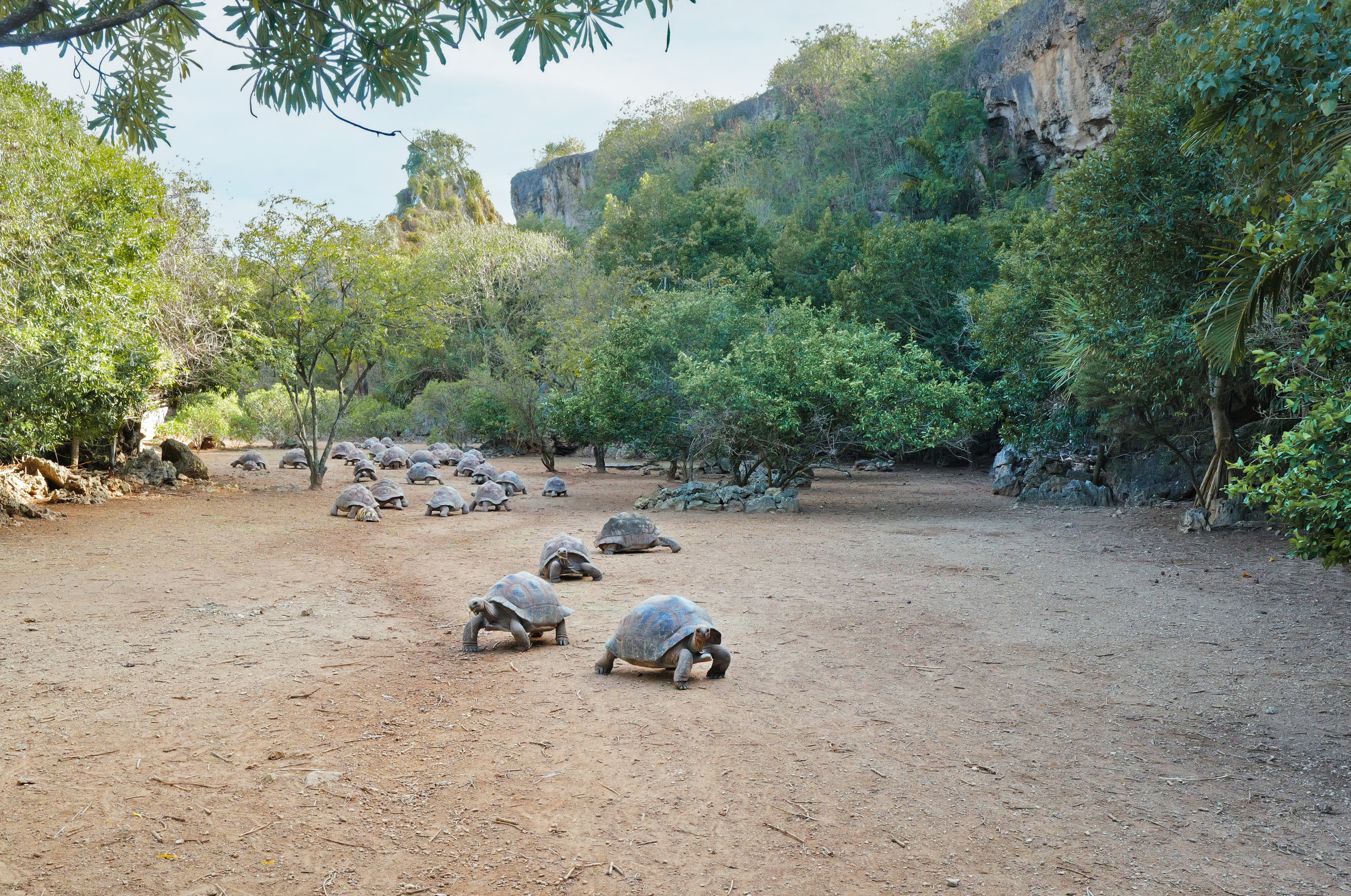
Aldabra giant tortoises living at the bottom of Tiyel Canyon at François Leguat Reserve.

François Leguat Giant Tortoise and Cave Reserve ("Francois Leguat Reserve") is a park and nature reserve on the island of Rodrigues, dedicated to protecting the fauna and flora of the island. The reserve first opened in August 2007 as part of the same project as La Vanille Reserve in Mauritius. It is named after the 18th century Huguenot settler François Leguat, who recorded much of the island's natural flora and fauna before it went extinct. The reserve includes a museum, several education centres and information areas, and a restaurant.

== Description ==
=== The fauna ===
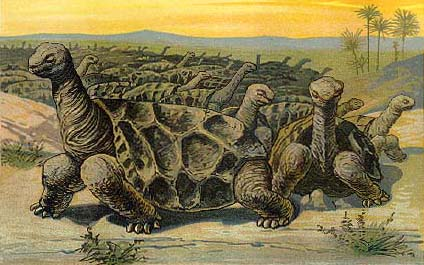
Drawing of a moving herd of Cylindraspis vosmaeri on Rodrigues

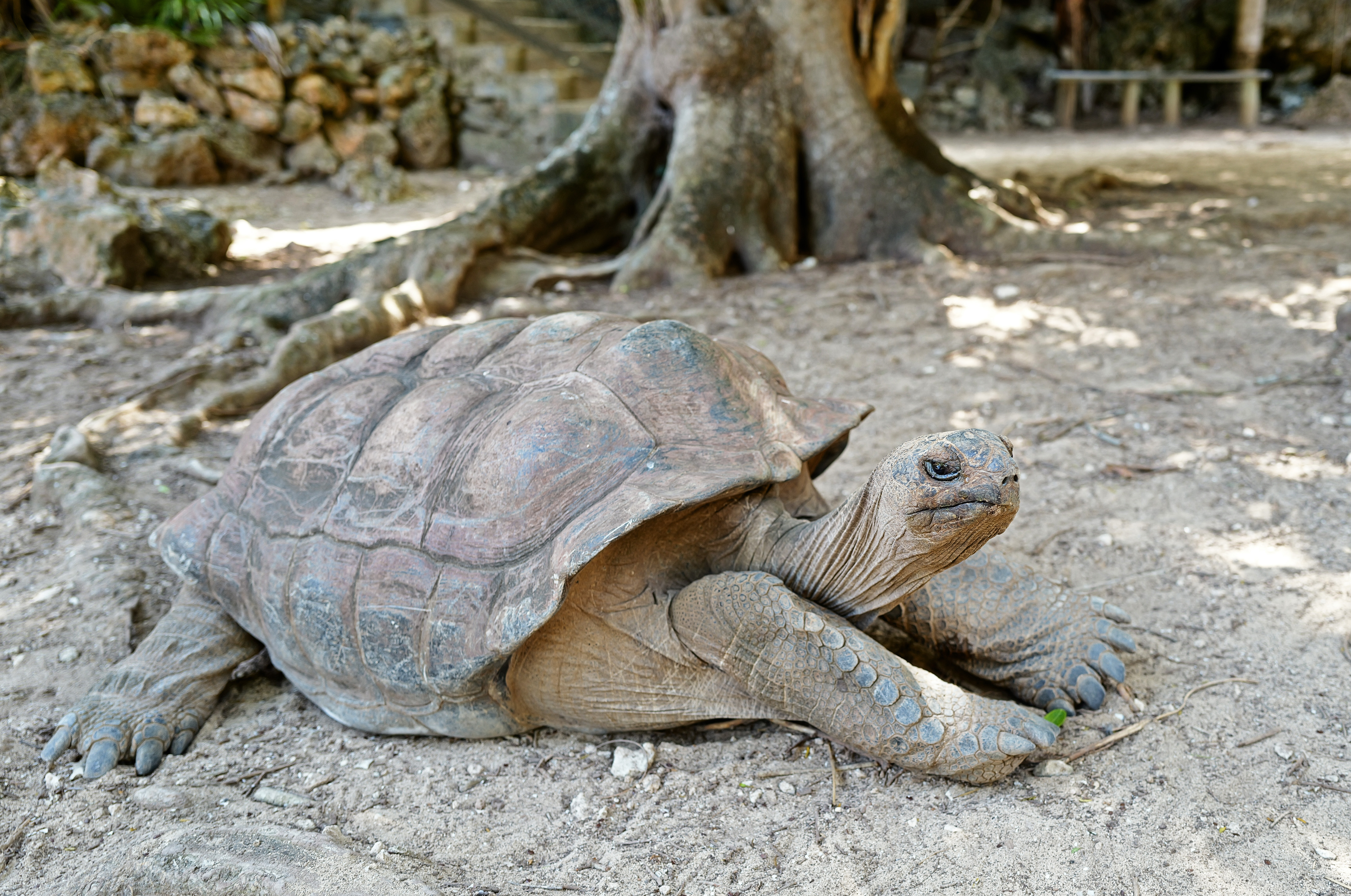
An introduced Aldabra giant tortoise (Aldabrachelys gigantea) in Tiyel Canyon at Francois Leguat Reserve

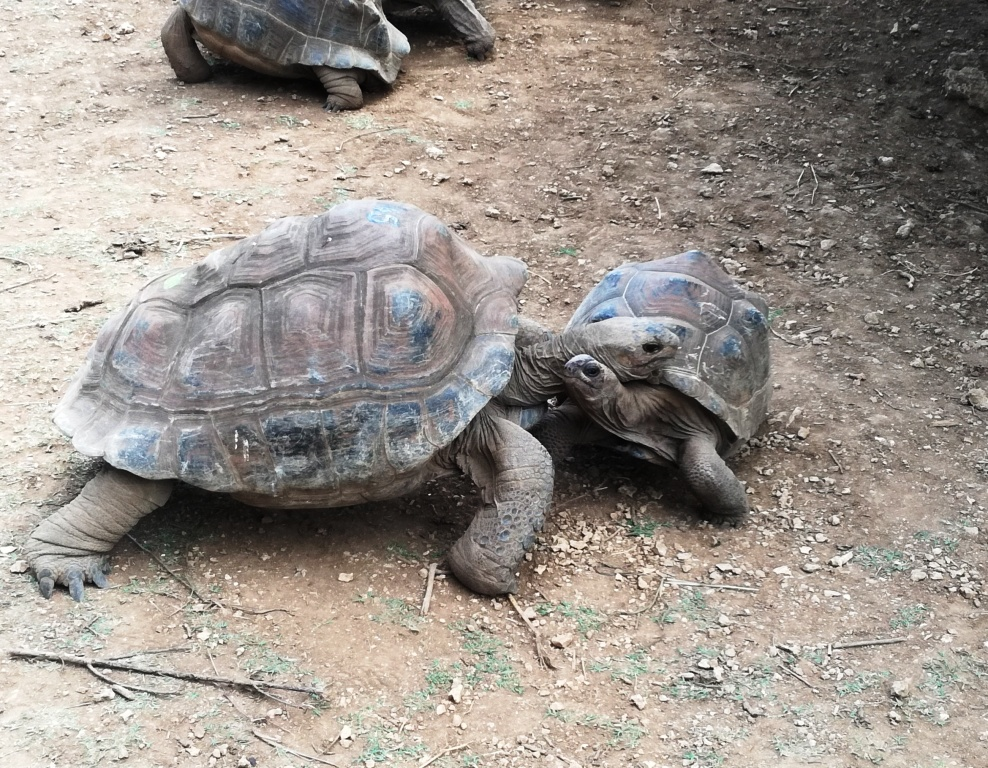
Introduced Aldabra giant tortoises (Aldabrachelys gigantea) at Francois Leguat Reserve

Rodrigues was once home to many unique, and endemic species of animals that have sadly gone extinct because of people. These animals include the Rodrigues night heron, Rodrigues day gecko, Rodrigues giant day gecko, Rodrigues solitaire, Rodrigues parrot, Rodrigues rail, Rodrigues pigeon, Rodrigues blue pigeon, Newton's parakeet, Rodrigues starling, Rodrigues scops owl, Geonemertes rodericana worm, a butterfly called Euploea desjardinsii, and two species of giant tortoise: the tall-standing, long-necked, saddle-backed Cylindraspis vosmaeri that browsed the trees and bushes; and the smaller, low, dome-shelled Cylindraspis peltastes that grazed grasses and ground vegetation. At the time of the arrival of human settlers, dense tortoise herds of many thousands were reported on Rodrigues. Typically for isolated island species, they were reported to have been friendly and unafraid of humans.

By early accounts, the tall Cylindraspis vosmaeri in particular was a social animal that lived and interacted in herds, and showed no fear of humans. In the ensuing years, sailors and settlers slaughtered the tortoises in enormous numbers. Occasional individual tortoises are recorded as being found surviving in isolated valleys of the island until as late as 1802. They do not seem to have survived the ensuing period though, when settlers used vast fires to clear the entire island of vegetation, to access it for agriculture.

The tortoises however, played a crucial role in the health of the island's indigenous vegetation and ecosystems. Their movements and grazing rejuvenated the vegetation, and the seeds of many plants needed the tortoises for dispersal and germination. For this reason, nearly two hundred years after the extinction of their endemic predecessors, the reserve introduced 500 Aldabra giant tortoises (Aldabrachelys gigantea), 40 radiated tortoises (Astrochelys radiata), and more recently several rescued ploughshare tortoises (Astrochelys yniphora). This is in order to play the role of the original species, in ensuring the health of the natural vegetation. Currently the population of these introduced tortoises has risen to 2000.

Other animals include the Rodrigues fruit bat (Pteropus rodricensis), the rarest bat in the world and one of only three endemic animals to survive in Rodrigues. In 1970, only 70 of these bats remained, but extreme conservation efforts have now helped the species recover. The other two endemic species that can still be found on rodrigues are two species of birds. The Rodrigues warbler, and the Rodrigues fody. Almost all the other animals that are native to rodrigues have since become extinct, while two species of lizards being the Bojer's skink, and the Telfair's skink have both become locally extinct on rodrigues.

=== The flora ===
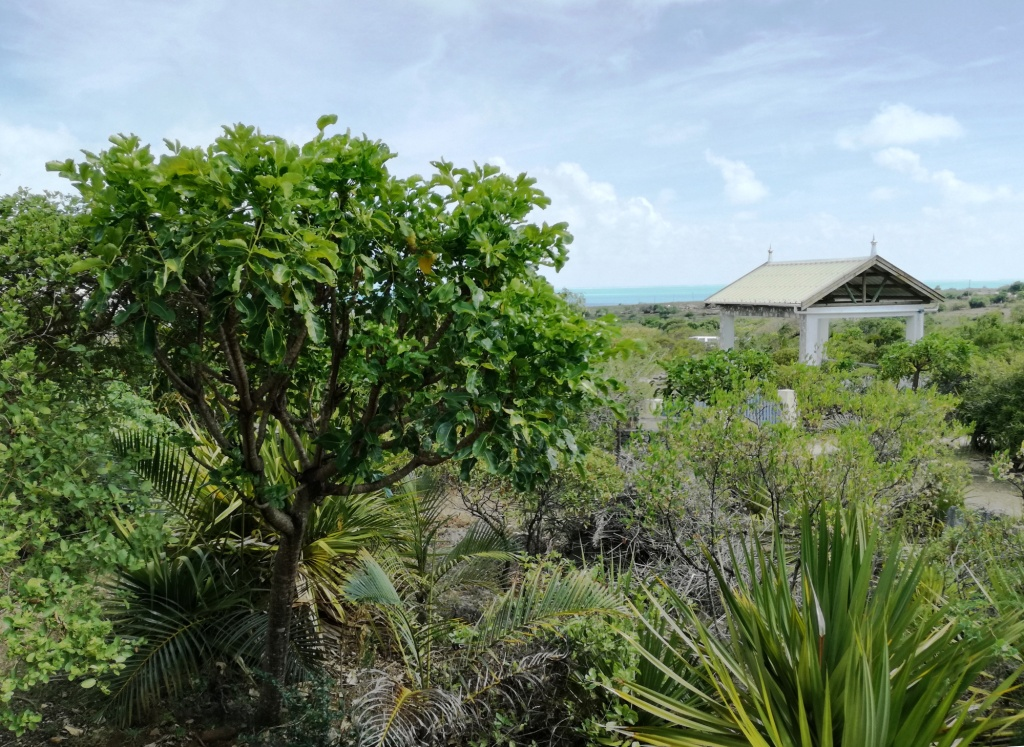
Polyscias rodriguesiana

The reserve conserves a portion of Rodrigues island's almost extinct coastal flora. Along with Anse Quitor Nature Reserve next door, it is the only remaining patch of this ecosystem.

The vegetation is being restored and over 100,000 plants from 33 indigenous and endemic species have been planted. The giant tortoises perform an important role - once played by Rodrigues extinct giant tortoise species - of rejuvenating and maintaining the ecosystem, through their grazing and movements.

=== The caves ===
The cave system in the reserve includes the Grande-Caverne (500 meters long) and the Caverne-de-la-Vierge (255 meters), along with others that are closed or not yet rehabilitated. The reserve's tours include a trip through the caves, which are the only caves in the Indian Ocean equipped with lights.

== Location ==
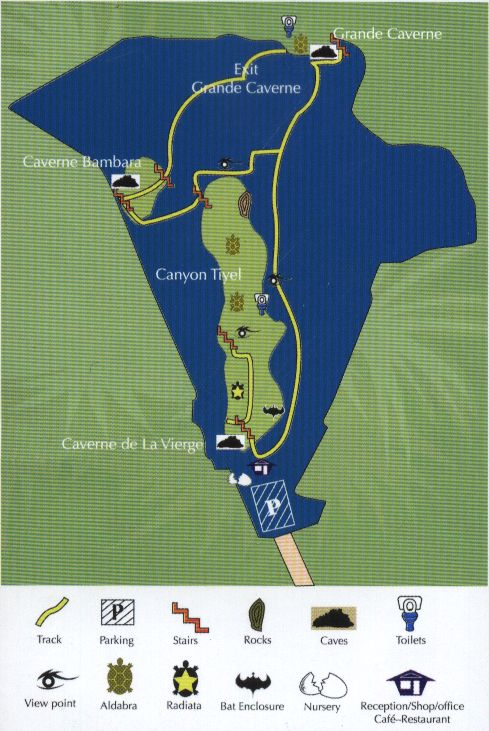
Map of the reserve

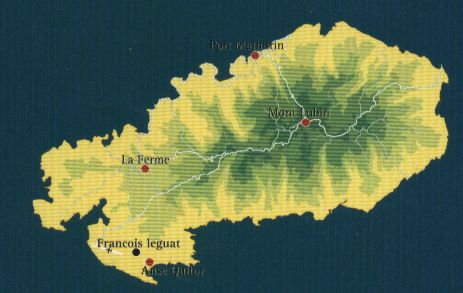
Location of François Leguat Reserve on Rodrigues island

Francois Leguat Reserve is located on the Anse Quitor peninsula in the south-west of the island, a few hundred meters from the Rodrigues airport and right beside Anse Quitor Nature Reserve (not yet open to the public).
