= Mont Malartic =

- Location within Indian Ocean

Highest point
- Elevation: 386 m (1,266 ft)
- Coordinates: 19°42′44″S 63°26′02″E

Geography
- Location: Rodrigues, Mauritius

Mont Malartic is the second-highest point on the Mauritian island of Rodrigues, with a height of 386 metres (1,266 ft). There is a trail leading to the summit. The Tropidophora articulata land snail was once abundant throughout Rodrigues, but now can only be found in the forested areas of Mont Malartic and Grande Montagne.

== See also ==
- Mont Limon – Mountain in Mauritius
