= Sega tambour of Rodrigues Island =

Type of performing art of Mauritius

Sega tambour
- Stylistic origins: Sega
- Cultural origins: Rodrigues

Sega tambour of Rodrigues Island
- UNESCO Intangible Cultural Heritage
- Country: Mauritius
- Reference: 01257
- Region: Africa

Inscription history
- Inscription: 2017 (12th session)
- List: Representative

Sega tambour of Rodrigues Island is one of the types of Sega music of Mauritius, with origins in the Rodrigues Island, a small island about 108 square kilometres (42 sq mi) in area.

== Description ==
Sega Tambour of Rodrigues Island is a performance of music and dance with its origins in slave communities.

== See also ==
- Music of Mauritius
- Sega
