= Mont Limon =

Mountain in Mauritius

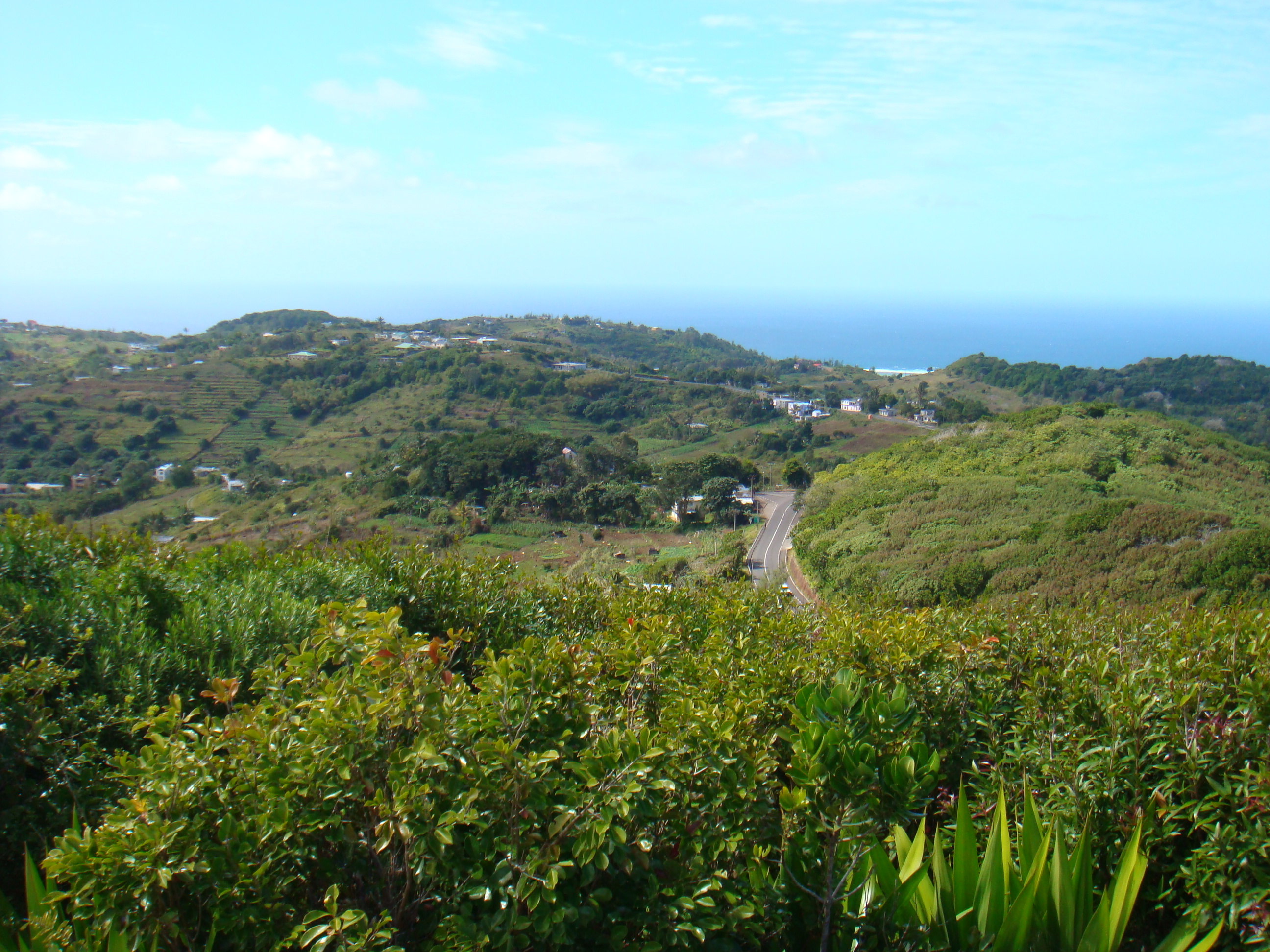

Highest point
- Elevation: 389 m (1,276 ft)
- Prominence: 389 m (1,276 ft)
- Isolation: 599.12 km (372.28 mi)
- Coordinates: 19°42′24″S 63°26′47″E

Geography
- Location within Indian Ocean
- Location: Rodrigues, Mauritius

Mont Limon is the highest point on the Mauritian island of Rodrigues.

It is located roughly in the center of the eastern part of the island and has a height of 389 metres (1,276 ft). Some sources give a higher elevation of 398 m (1,306 ft). It is located approximately four kilometres south-east of the island's capital, Port Mathurin.

== See also ==
- Mont Malartic
