= Anse Quitor Nature Reserve =

Nature reserve on the island of Rodrigues

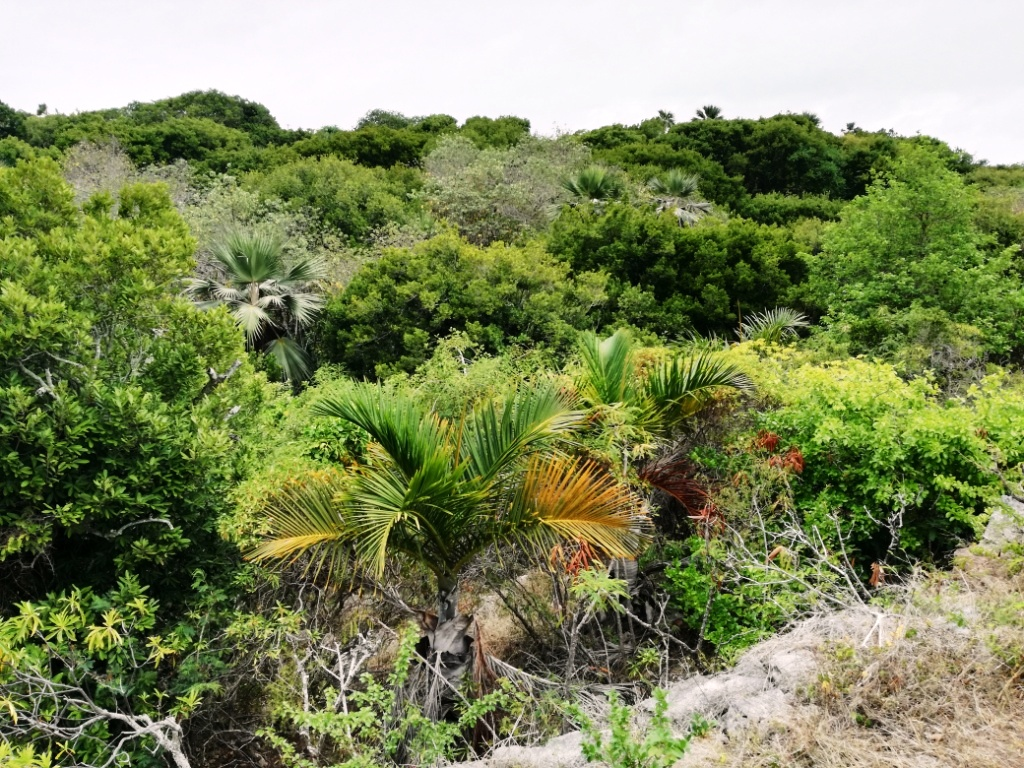
Valley thicket in Anse Quitor Nature Reserve

Anse Quitor Nature Reserve is a 34 ha nature reserve on the island of Rodrigues, established in 1996, and preserving one of the sole surviving pieces of the island's coastal ecosystem.

== Description ==
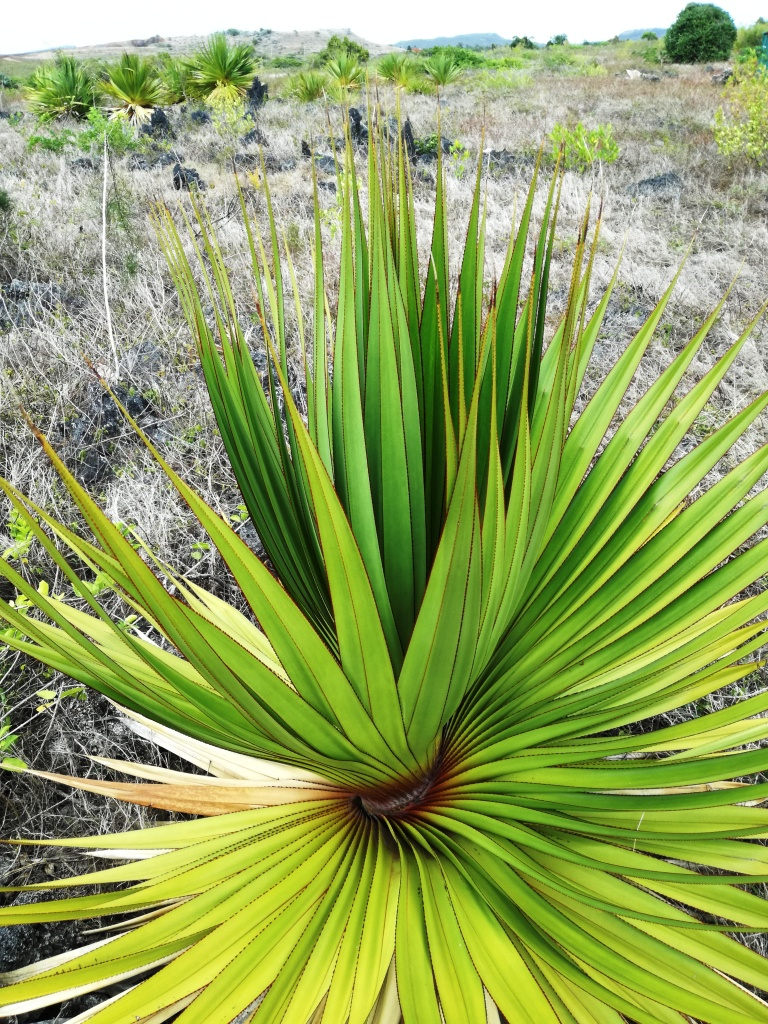
The endemic Pandanus heterocarpus at Anse Quitor Nature Reserve

It is located in the south-west of the island, on the Anse Quitor peninsula, near to the Airport, and right beside the Francois Leguat Reserve. The landscape is near the coast, close to sea-level, and relatively dry. The vegetation grows on limestone and coral based soils.

It is not yet open to the public. Intensive rehabilitation efforts are ongoing, with thousands of endemic plant species planted. Some of the rare species found in the reserve include Zanthoxylum paniculatum and Polyscias rodriguesiana.
