= Jean-Claude Pierre-Louis =

Mauritian politician

Jean-Claude Pierre-Louis was the Chief Executive of Rodrigues Island, Mauritius between October 24, 2004, and March 2010.

Pierre-Louis was the second person to hold the title since it was created in 2002. He had threaten to quit after a dispute with Chief Commissioner of Rodrigues Johnson Roussety

| Preceded by Claude Wong So | Chief Executive of Rodrigues; 2004-2010 | Succeeded by Pritam Singh Mattan |
