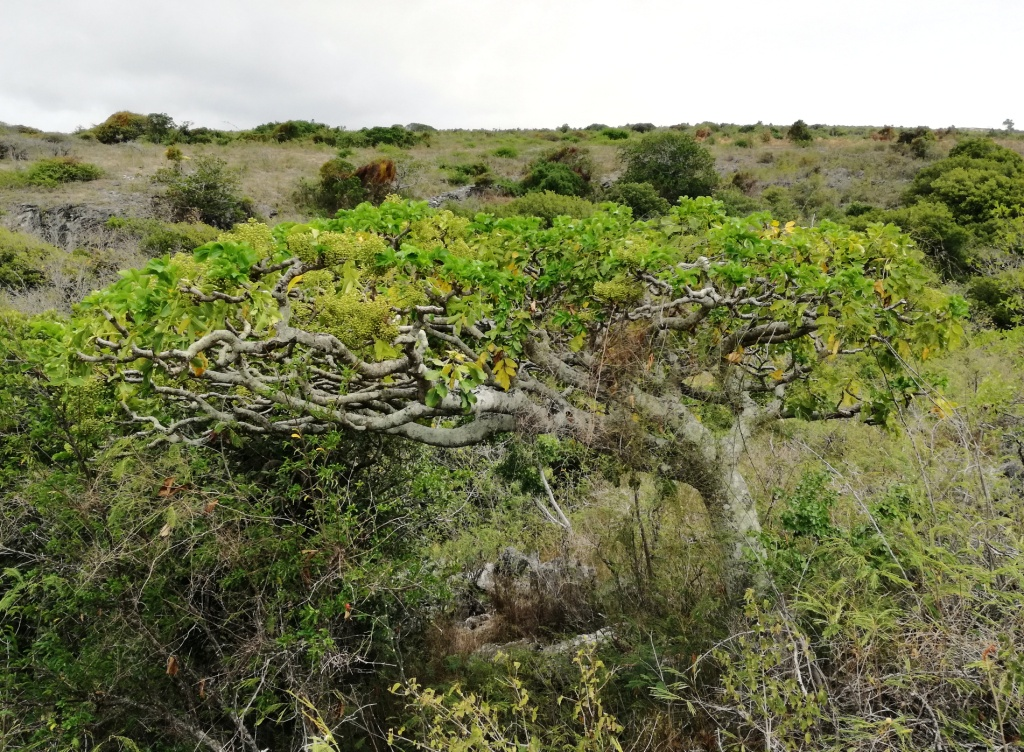
- Adult plant at Anse Quitor Nature Reserve

Conservation status
- Critically Endangered (IUCN 3.1)

Scientific classification
- Kingdom: Plantae
- Clade: Tracheophytes
- Clade: Angiosperms
- Clade: Eudicots
- Clade: Asterids
- Order: Apiales
- Family: Araliaceae
- Genus: Polyscias
- Species: P. rodriguesiana

Binomial name
- Polyscias rodriguesiana (Marais) Lowry & G.M.Plunkett

Synonyms
- Gastonia rodriguesiana Marais

= Polyscias rodriguesiana =

Species of flowering plant

Polyscias rodriguesiana is a species of rare flowering plant in the family Araliaceae. Formerly called Gastonia rodriguesiana, it is sometimes referred to by the common name "bois blanc".

== Habitat ==
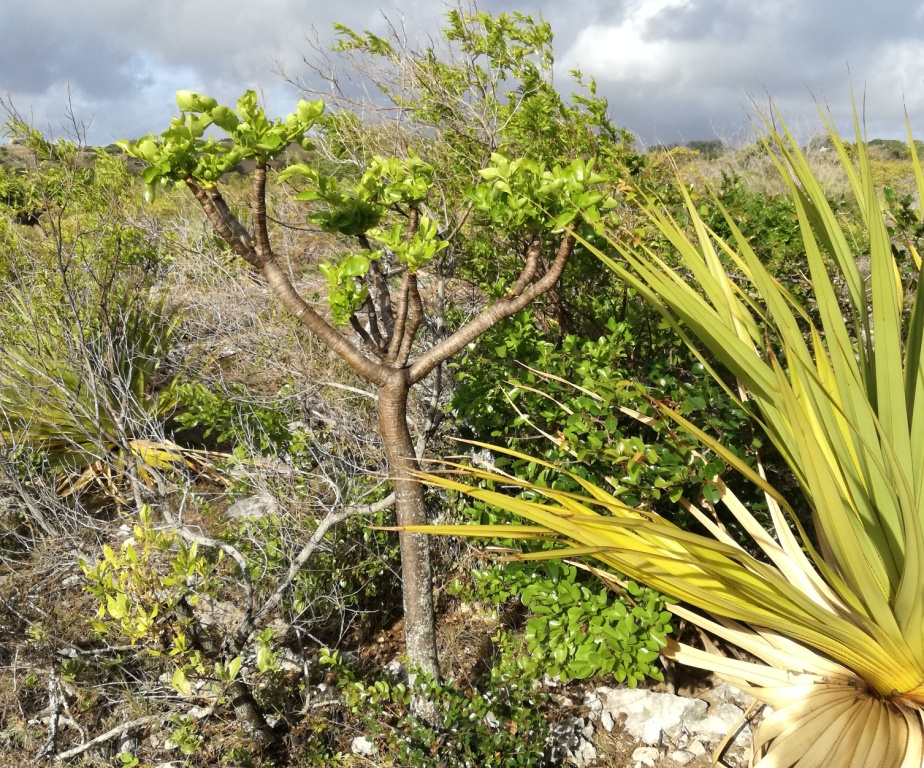
A small juvenile plant, growing in coastal coral sediments at François Leguat Giant Tortoise and Cave Reserve.

It is endemic to the island of Rodrigues, in Mauritius. It used to occur throughout Rodrigues island, but was especially common in coastal regions and on limestone or old coral sediments. It is now critically endangered.

== Description ==
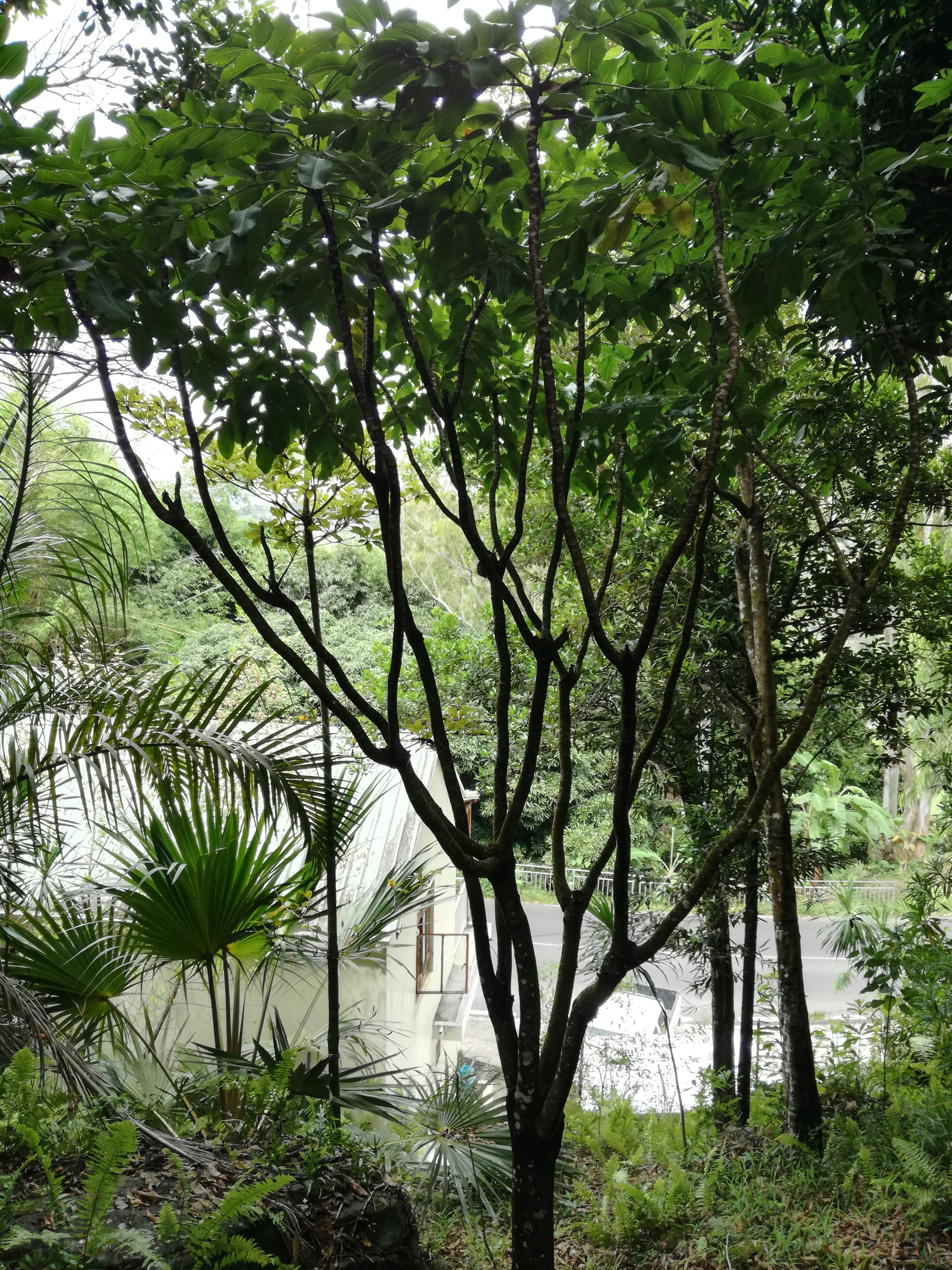
"Bois blanc" can become tall and slender, when grown in deep shade, like this specimen in Grande Montagne Nature Reserve.

It has a soft, swollen trunk and thick branches. It can reach a height of 6 meters, but is usually shorter and more compact.

Its leaves are heterophyllous, like its close relative Polyscias maraisiana on Mauritius island to the west. Adult plants' leaves are shiny, rounded and bright green.
