= The Prophecy (reggae band) =

Mauritian music group (formed 2015)

The Prophecy is a Mauritian seggae music band created in 2015 by Murvin Clélie (voice) and Olivier Dauphine (guitar).
