= Krapo Kriyé =

Studio album by Grup Latanier
- Released: 1981
- Recorded: 1981
- Genre: Santé engagé
- Label: EMI

Grup Latanier chronology
Krapo Kriyé (1981)	Nuvo Simé (1982)

Krapo Kriyé is the first studio album by the Mauritian committed song (santé engazé) band Grup Latanier, released in 1981. The title song is commonly believed to be the most popular santé engazé song in Mauritius.

It was originally released in 1981 on compact audio cassette. A CD version of the album was later released in 2000.

== Overview ==
After the dissolution of Soley Ruz, Grup Latanier was created in November 1979. Under the leadership of the Joganah brothers (Ram Joganah & Nitish Joganah), the band released their first album in 1981. It quickly gained in popularity mainly because of the great success of the title song of the album. The song (Krapo Kriyé) has since featured in many of Grup Latanier's album releases.

== Track listing ==
The list of the songs of the album as shown below is arranged in alphabetical order and is not necessarily in the order in which the album was originally released.

1. "Degazé" – 3:33
2. "Fos Profet" – 3:25
3. "Krapo Kriyé" – 5:54
4. "Lespri Bloké" – 3:20
5. "Mo Marse Marsé" – 4:28
6. "Nu Kuma Dimun" – 3:08
7. "Patron" – 2:47
8. "Pritifi" – 3:38
9. "Rann Nu Later" – 3:15
10. "Rétar Nu Kiltir" – 3:09
11. "Sinistré" – 2:56
12. "Soweto" – 4:55
13. "Ton Madev" – 4:31
14. "Zardinié" – 3:49
