= Santé engagé =

Mauritian music genre

- Stylistic origins: Sega music, Indian music, Chinese Music and Western music
- Cultural origins: 1970s, Mauritius
- Typical instruments: Typical Mauritian Sega instruments: ravanne - maravane - triangle Indian instruments: Tabla - harmonium - sitar Western instruments: Guitar - drums - Bass - Djembe - Violin - Harmonica - Banjo - Fiddle - Accordion - Hornpipe; Chinese instruments: Yangqin - Shamisen - Shakuhachi - Maracas - Drums - Hornpipe

Other topics
- Grup Latanier - Soley Ruz - Bam Cuttayen - Siven Chinien - Zul Ramiah - Zenfan Dodo

Santé engagé (Morisyen: sante angaze) is a genre of Mauritian music which consists of singing and rapping protest songs. It is a way to protest against political/social oppression and repression through music. The genre mixes traditional Mauritian sega with Indian, Chinese and Western influences.

== History ==
=== Context ===
The 1960s and 1970s ("les années de braise") have been a very bustling period in the history of Mauritius. It has been a period of high interracial tension leading to more than 300 deaths due to interracial affrays. It has also been an indecisive period with regard to the cultural heirloom of the island with a deep reconsidering of the multicultural image.

==== Independence of Mauritius ====
Mauritius attained independence from Great Britain in 1968 without real exhilaration. A profound division prevailed between, on one side, the members of the independent movement and, on the other side, the anti-independentists. The island is faced with a vertiginously high level of unemployment and people still had in mind the recent interracial tensions peaking in 1964 and 1968.

Under the pretext of security and law and order, the newly formed government of Mauritius took highly repressive measures against opponents who intended to put forward ideas adverse to those of the governing regime.

Even though independence was declared in 1968, British colonial presence and dominance remained clearly visible throughout the 1970s.

==== Raise in consciousness ====
Faced with such restrictions, youngsters (mostly university students) started to set up groups to debate on all ideological topics including politics and culture. Several students, among others Dev Virahsawmy, Jooneed Jeeroburkhan, Tirat Ramkisoon, Krishen Matis, Ah-Ken Wong, Kreeti Goburdhun, Vella Vengaroo created the Club of Students (Club des Etudiants). With the participation of Paul Bérenger, the Club of Students became the Club of Militant Students (Clubs des Etudiants militants). The Club later gave way to the creation of the Mauritian Militant Movement (in 1969) lauding national unity and social justice, inspired from the Libertarian Marxism movement.

Along with this political movement, youngsters started militating for cultural freedom. The government redoubled its repressive actions against them, using the police force and tappeurs for assaults against the youngsters. Many members of the MMM are jailed as political prisoners.

==== Fight through culture and music ====
The young generation however never abdicated. Freedom of culture was a fundamental element of their resistance, specially the fight for the recognition of the Mauritian creole as a full-fledged language.

In the early 1970s they started to create cultural groups (Morisyen: Grup Kiltirel) to debate about culture. Along with this new form of resistance, young artists started to write songs reflecting their thoughts. The Groups travelled throughout the island to meet people and make their voice heard. They also sang those songs with committed lyrics which, in a certain way, clearly expressed the reality of the moment. The theme of these songs where various: politics, injustice, oppression, etc. The very first santé engazé is believed to be "Montagne Bertlo" written and composed by Jooneed Jeeroburkhan in 1969 in Mauritius, after completing his higher studies in Canada (on a Commonwealth Scholarship).

Resistance and denunciation through music quickly became popular. It helped to transmit ideas more easily. It is this style of music that is called santé engazé (committed song).

=== Golden age ===
It is commonly agreed that sante angaze really erupted with the Grup Kiltirel Soley Ruz (or Soley Ruz) formed in 1973. This cultural group, gathered many talented friends-artists, among others Bam Cuttayen, Micheline Virahsawmy, Rosemay Nelson, Nitish Joganah, Ram Joganah and Lélou Ménwar, Bruno Jacques, Paulo . They travelled throughout the island to sing their committed songs. Soley Ruz quickly became popular around the island.

In 1975, another group kiltirel is formed (Grup Kiltirel Morisien) with, among others, Odile Chevreau, Siven Chinien, Habib Moosaheb, Rama Poonoosamy as members. Subsequently, other groups were formed: Fangurin, Kler de linn, Fler kanne, Flamboyant, Sitronel, Ebène, Grup kiltirel IDP.

After the dissolution of Soley Ruz in 1979, many of its members started solo careers. Ram and Nitish Joganah created in the same year a new group, the Grup Latanier which would become the new symbol of sante angaze. Santé engazé stayed extremely popular among the population during the 1980s, specially within the working-class.

== Musical style ==
Sante angaze is a musical style which blends Sega music, Oriental music, Chinese Music and Occidental music. It is a fusion of musical styles which were popular at the time of its creation, i.e., in the 1970s. In fact it perfectly reflected the frame of mind of those who were at the origins of this style, that is a mixture of the cultural diversity of the island, towards cultural unity.

Traditional instruments of the sega music (ravanne, maravane, triangle) were thus mixed with oriental instruments (tabla, harmonium, sitar) and Chinese instruments (Yangqin, Shamisen, Shakuhachi). Other instruments such as guitar, violin and drums completed that mixture.

Even though the sonority of such committed songs are close to the sega music, the outcome is quite different insofar as the sega music has a more festive rhythm and lesser oriented on demonstrating and passing on a particular message.

The rhythm of sante angaze is generally slower than the sega and influenced by many other musical styles.

== Relation to politics ==
Due to the context during which it has been created and its relationship with militancy, sante angaze (at least in its early years) is closely related to politics. The songs denounced political injustice and unfairness becoming intrinsically a form of militancy. The artists were themselves militants. Santé engazé has played a great part during general elections acting as the voice of the militant movement. The most notable example in this respect is the songs written and sung by Siven Chinien. His album soldat lalit was played (and is still played) throughout the general elections campaign, with the title song – "Soldat Lalit" – becoming the anthem of the MMM.

== Groups and musicians ==
=== Soley Ruz ===
Soley Ruz was created in 1973 at the initiative of various friends-artists, among others Bam Cuttayen, Micheline Virahsawmy, Rosemay Nelson, Nitish Joganah, Ram Joganah and Lélou Ménwar, Bruno Jacques, Paulo, Marino. They released three albums: Nuvo Kiltir in 1974, Buké Banané in 1976 and Later 7 Couler in 1978. The group was dissolved in 1979 and most of its members started solo careers. Some continued in the field of santé engazé while others changed to adopt other musical styles.

=== Bam Cuttayen ===
Bam Cuttayen was a songwriter and singer who has deeply marked the socio-cultural history of Mauritius. He was born in 1951 in Quatre Bornes (Mauritius) and died in 2002. He dedicated his life to his fight against poverty and injustice. His songs reflect his battle. Bam Cuttayen released his first album Fler raket in 1980. Three other albums followed: Pei larm kuler in 1981, Zenfan later in 1986 and Brin soley in 1993. In 2003, a posthumous album (Parol envolé) of his songs has been edited.

=== Siven Chinien ===
Siven Chinien was a songwriter, singer and a militant activist. Even though he has composed songs on extremely various themes, his work is mostly remembered for his commitment to the Mauritian Militant Movement and his numerous militant songs in favour of the working-class.

=== Grup Latanier ===
Grup Latanier was created by Ram and Nitish Joganah after they parted from Soley Ruz. The group has since remained very active and released numerous albums.

=== Zul Ramiah ===
Zul Ramiah is a songwriter and singer. He began his musical career within the Grup kiltirel IDP before contributing to the albums of Siven Chinien (Soldat lalit) and Bam Cuttayen. Zul Ramiah also participated to Grup Latanier's first album krapo kriyé. He then went on to start a solo career.

=== Grup Zenfan Dodo ===
Grup Zenfan Dodo is a group from Mahébourg. Led by singers Ruben Gopal and Kishan Pem, they have released several albums since the mid 90s.

== Influence on today's Mauritian music ==
Sante angaze has radically transformed the musical landscape of Mauritius.

=== Evolution of Santé engazé ===
Even though many people today consider sante angaze as a revolved musical style, the latter still exists and much appreciated. Santé engazé has simply evolved. The militantly oriented protests of its origins have gradually evolved and broaden to other subjects, not specially related to politics. The core of its philosophy however remains the same: raise people's consciousness through music. Sante angaze is today less related to the musical style than the lyrics of songs. In other words, what we call a sante angaze today is a song with a committed lyrics, passing a committed message, whatever the musical style. That's why today it is better to talk of lamizik angaze (committed music) rather than sante angaze.

=== The new generation ===
The evolution and influence of sante angaze can clearly be noticed within the new generation of artists in Mauritius. The music of Mauritius has diversified through years but the impact of santé engazé is visible insofar as the new generation of artists, whatever their musical style (sega music, seggae, reggae, ragga, dancehall, etc.), try to use music to transmit a specific message. Their inspirations remain wide-ranging: poverty, injustice, social wrongdoings, war, cultural unity, etc. These artists are the sons and heirs of santé engazé. However, the vast majority of them deny to be politically oriented preferring to remain neutral and denouncing through music.
