= Chief Executive of Rodrigues =

The Chief Executive of Rodrigues is in daily charge of the administration on the island of Rodrigues under the Chief Commissioner of Rodrigues.

The current Chief Executive is Jacques Davis Hee Hong Wye.

== List of Chief Executives of Rodrigues ==
- Claude Wong So (24 October 2002 – 23 October 2004)
- Jean-Claude Pierre-Louis (24 October 2004 – March 5 2010)
- Pritam Singh Mattan (March 5 2010 – 24 August 2010)
- Joseph Ah-Leong Chang-Siow (24 August 2010 – 13 February 2012)
- Jacques Davis Hee Hong Wye (13 February 2012 – 21 March 2022)
- Jean-Claude Pierre-Louis (21 March 2022 – present)
