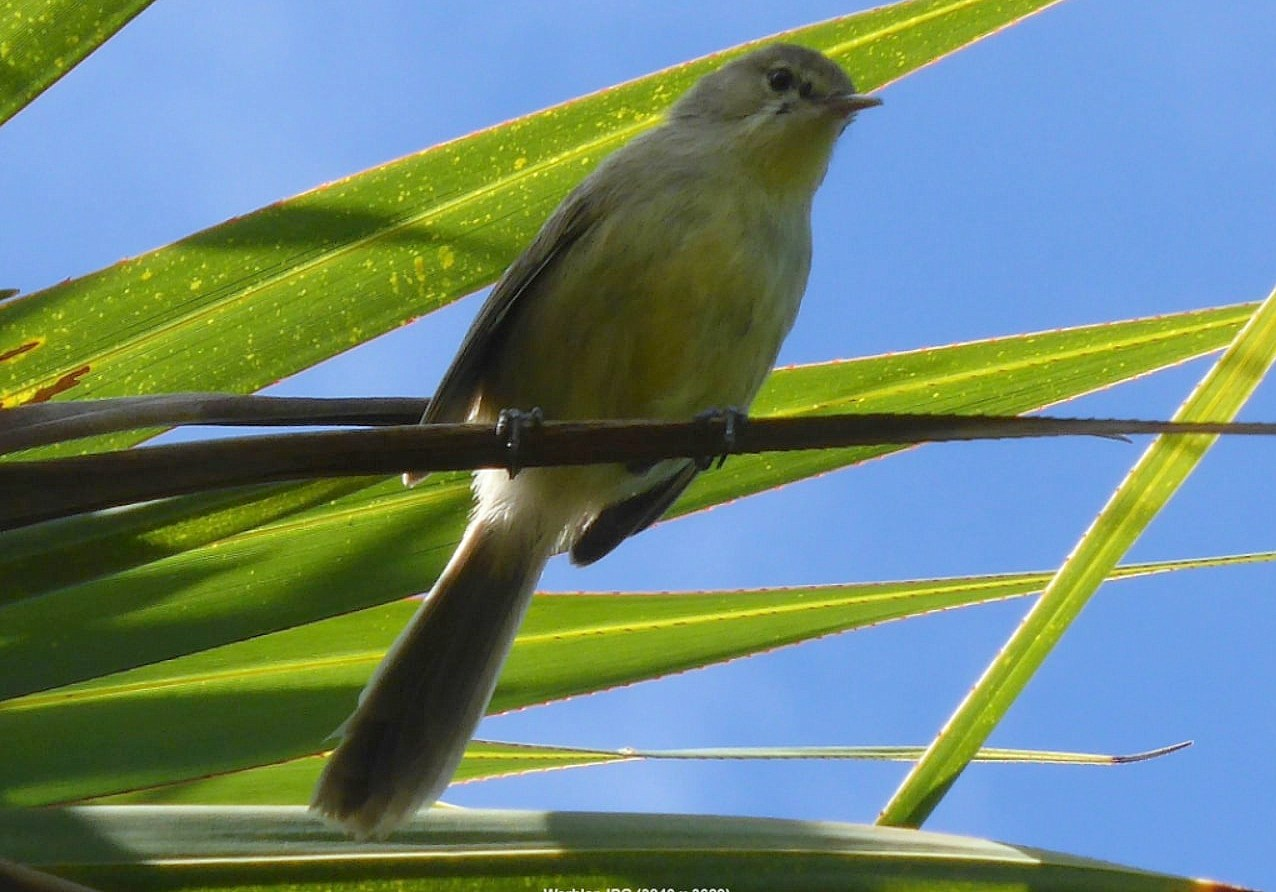

Conservation status
- Least Concern (IUCN 3.1)

Scientific classification
- Kingdom: Animalia
- Phylum: Chordata
- Class: Aves
- Order: Passeriformes
- Family: Acrocephalidae
- Genus: Acrocephalus
- Species: A. rodericanus

Binomial name
- Acrocephalus rodericanus (A. Newton, 1865)
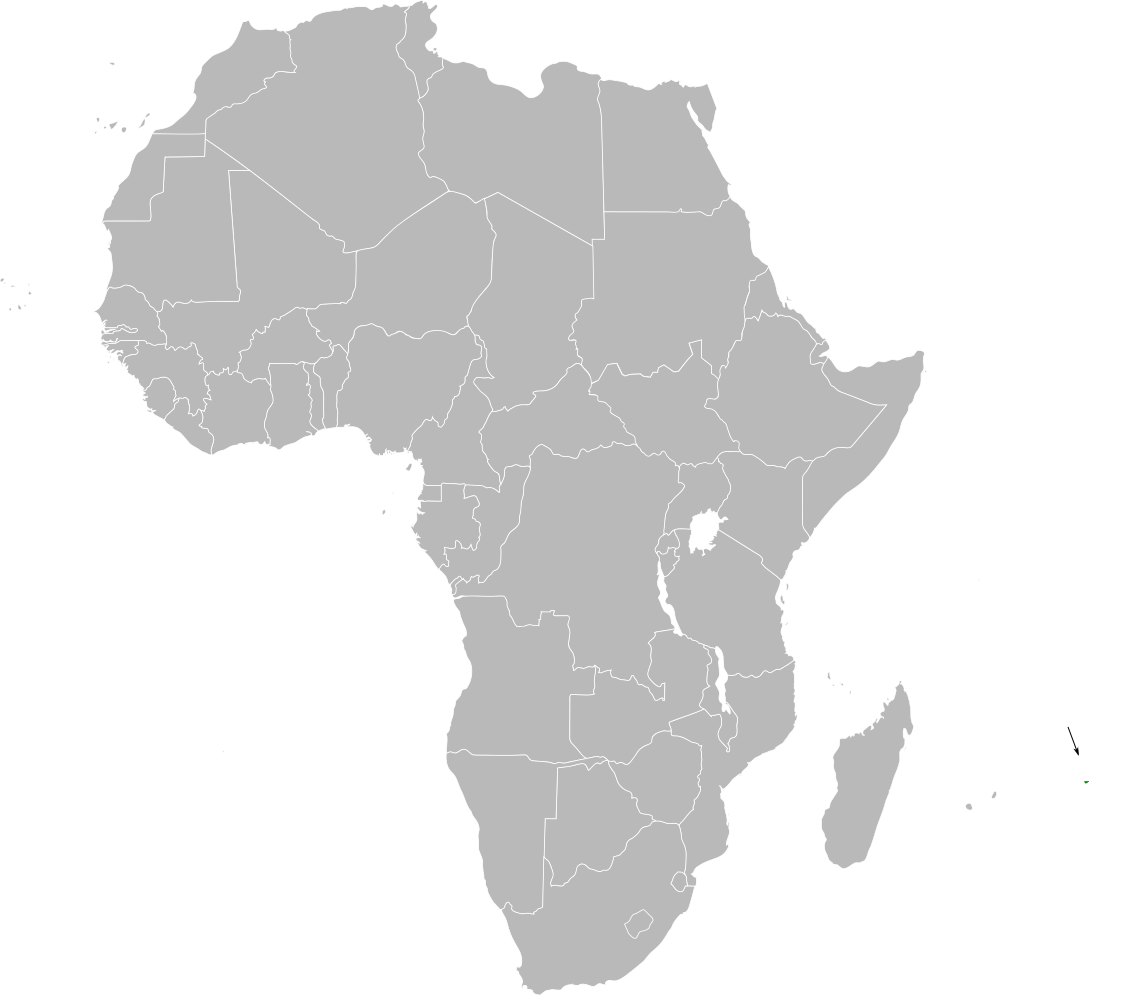

Synonyms
- Bebrornis rodericanus (Newton, 1865)

= Rodrigues warbler =

Species of bird

The Rodrigues warbler (Acrocephalus rodericanus) is a species of Old World warbler in the family Acrocephalidae.

It is found only on the island of Rodrigues (which belongs to Mauritius) and used to be plentiful there. Their population soon got smaller. Cyclone Monique in 1968 almost wiped out the entire species. Then a cyclone in 1979 reduced the population even more. The main threats to these birds is the destruction of vegetation for fuel or grazing, rats, and cyclones (natural disasters).

It was considered extinct in the 1960s, but was rediscovered in the 1970s.

Its natural habitats are subtropical or tropical dry shrubland, subtropical or tropical moist shrubland, and plantations.

It is threatened by habitat loss.
