= 1999 Mauritian riots =

Riots and protests following a death in police custody

- Date: 21 February 1999 - 25 February 1999
- Location: Roche Bois, Port Louis, Mauritius; 20°08′49″S 57°30′40″E
- Caused by: Death of Joseph Réginald Topize in police custody
- Methods: Rioting, clashes with law enforcement, looting, property damage, protests, ethnic clashes
- Result: 5 dead Hundreds injured Extensive looting and property damage 250 escaped prisoners

The 1999 Mauritian riots were national-scale rioting and protests in Mauritius following the death of the popular "seggae" musician Joseph Réginald Topize, better known by his stage name "Kaya", in police custody. The rioting lasted for four days from 21 to 25 February 1999. Four civilians and one police officer were killed in the riots with hundreds of people suffering injuries. It was the first incidence of mass rioting in Mauritius since the country's 1968 riots. The riots resulted in a majority of the island's police stations being sacked by protesters with 250 prisoners escaping prison. Many businesses were looted and substantial property damage was done with over 200 vehicles being set on fire.

== Background ==
Following independence and a period of ethnic riots shortly before independence, Mauritius experienced a thirty year period of peace and rapid economic growth. This, along with the efforts by Mauritian political and bureaucratic leaders to be inclusive of representatives of minority communities in policy-making, had the effect of reducing ethnic tensions. During this period the Hindu majority in Mauritius gained dominance within the government. The period of high economic growth also lead to significant wealth disparities despite overall increasing living standards for all Mauritians. The education system, although free and universal, was highly competitive and reliant on additional private tutoring; this resulted in widening economic inequalities by limiting access to higher education for poorer, often Creole, Mauritians. In the 1990s, this phenomenon of exclusion became known as Malaise Créole.

The popular Mauritian Creole seggae musician Joseph Topize (Kaya) was arrested on 18 February 1999 for smoking marijuana at a rally for its decriminalisation which had been organised by Rama Valayden at Edward VII Square, Rose-Hill. Kaya was a vocal proponent of Creole rights and was viewed as an important voice of the Creole community. On 23 February, three days after Kaya's arrest, he died in police custody. The fracturing of his skull led protesters to assume his death was the result of police brutality. The government denied allegations of brutality and blamed Kaya's death on meningitis. Mauritian prime minister Navinchandra Ramgoolam promised a full inquiry to investigate the incident. At the time accusations of police brutality by the Mauritius Police Force was common with many vagrants being registered as having died whilst in police custody.

== Violence ==
Following the announcement of Kaya's death riots erupted in the predominantly-Creole Roche-Bois neighbourhood of Port Louis, where Kaya was from. Riots and protests quickly spread across the island. Numerous shops, public buildings, police stations, and vehicles were looted and set on fire by rioters whilst 250 prisoners were released by rioters from a local prison. Protesters and rioters blocked roads with burning tires. The death of another Roche Bois musician, Berger Agathe, after he was shot 92 times by the police, further enraged rioters. Agathe was shot whilst appealing to police for calm. An estimated 2,000 rioters participated in the disturbances.

Misinformation and rumours were rife. Instigators spread rumours of temples, mosques, and churches being attacked. Rumours were also spread of ethnic groups from Creole regions coming to attack other communities. This resulted in Creoles and Asian youths engaging in sporadic ethnic clashes in the streets. A number of homes where Creoles were in minority were burnt down and their occupants chased out of the area in sporadic acts of ethnic cleansing. Following a judicial inquiry the court found that three officers have used excessive force disproportionate to the events and in breach of the Standing Orders of the Police Force and recommended sanctions against the three police officers involved. The family of late Berger Agathe was represented by counsel Dick Ng Sui Wa.

== Response by authorities ==
For several days after the riots broke out there was a lack of centralised response by the authorities. There was no swift reaction from the relatively young Prime Minister, who had been elected in 1995 and was about to face general elections within a few months of the riots. As the riots worsened, the absence of the head of security forces was felt; Commissioner of Police André Feillafé was overseas on holidays in Hawaii as his part of his pre-retirement celebrations. Feillafé had been promoted as Commissioner of Police after the dismissal of former Commissioner of Police Raj Dayal who was the main subject of a Commission of Enquiry led by Judge Bernard Sik Yuen. Sik Yuen's enquiry focussed on allegations of fraudulent practices with the Mauritius Police Force during the purchase of breathalysers and renovation of the main gates of police headquarters (Line Barracks). There was confusion within the police regarding who was in charge. Eventually, it was the intervention of the President Cassam Uteem on Mauritius Broadcasting Corporation television that seemed to calm down spirits.

== Legacy ==
Following the riots the Mauritian government established a Rs 500 million (around US$ 20 million) Trust Fund for the Social Integration of Vulnerable Groups that amounted to 1.8% of the government's total budget for the financial year 1999-2000. The purpose of the fund was to fund micro-projects for people in poor regions of the country to facilitate national reconciliation and social integration.

The riots and resulting inter-ethnic conflict increased Hindu militancy. Some members of the Hindu community argued that intellectuals and church leaders were to blame for the riots for talking too much about the 'exclusion' of Creole Mauritians from broader Mauritian society, thereby misleading them about the real causes of the Malaise Créole. The Mauritian Hindu religious and political leader Harish Boodhoo and 3,500 other Mauritian Hindu religious leaders founded the All Mauritius Hindu Conference (AMHC). The AMHC denounced perceived social criticism of Hindus and alleged that Roman Catholic Church was solely responsible for the problem of Creole exclusion. The AMHC rejected calls for dialog issued by the Catholic Church. The majority of Mauritian Creoles are Roman Catholics and the church is often seen as expressing grievances on behalf of that community.

A monument to the riot and Kaya's death, depicting two crossed guitars, stands at the entrance to the Roche-Bois neighbourhood of Port Louis.

== State compensation to Kaya's wife ==
Véronique Topize, Kaya's wife from Beaux-Songes, sued the Government of Mauritius for damages and loss of income worth Rs 15 Millions through her lawyer Rex Stephen. In late 2005 hair stylist Véronique Topize accepted the sum of Rs 4.5 Millions from the Government of Mauritius after Rama Valayden, who was then the nominated Attorney General of the PTR–PMXD–VF–MR–MMSM government, made an agreement with her.
