= Latanier palm =

Latanier palm is a common name for several plants in palm family (Arecaceae) and may refer to:

- Phoenicophorium borsigianum, native to the Seychelles
- Certain fan palms native to the southeastern United States and the Caribbean
