= Bhojpuri Boys =

- Origin: Fond du Sac, Mauritius
- Genres: Folk music
- Members: Kishore Taucoory, Kunal Baboolall, Sunil Samjawon, Koushal Taucoory, Keshav Taucoory, Shakti Shiboo
- Past members: Ravin Sowamber

Bhojpuri Boys is one of the most popular Bhojpuri musical group in Mauritius. They sang in the Bhojpuri language, one of the ancestral languages of Mauritians of Indian origin. The band issued its first album Langaro in 1994.

== Singles ==
Some of their major hits in Mauritius include:

- Baigun Bagee
- Naiya Sirey (2003)
- Baje Baje
- Damade Baboo
- Hey Langaro (1994)
- Nisa Nisa
- Pot Puri
- Hey dadi
- La France
- Lougarou
