= Grup Latanier =

- Origin: Palma, Quatre Bornes in Mauritius
- Genres: Santé engagé
- Years active: 1979 to present
- Members: Ram Joganah; Nitish Joganah; Alain Remila cyril Boodoo sebastien Boodoo; Denis Gabriel; Jeyen Coolen; Kavi Joganah; Ashvin Moothoosamy; Nishal Boojhawon
- Past members: Lindsay Rousselin; Hervé Ga; Jean-Noel Brabant; Ram Gorapa; Bruno Mooken
- Website: http://gruplatanier.com/

Grup Latanier is a popular musical group in Mauritius. It was founded in 1979 and well known throughout the island for their committed songs (Santé engagé). Nearly 30 years after its creation, the group is still very influential. Its authors are inspired by political unfairness, poverty, war, loathing, banes, culture, etc. They denounce through their songs these human made wrongdoings.

== History ==
=== Soley Ruz ===
Mauritius attained its independence from the United Kingdom in March 1968. But in the early 1970s, the young nation was faced with social difficulties including a high level of unemployment. In 1969, the Mauritian Militant Movement (MMM) was created, mostly composed of students. This newly created political party quickly became the principal opposition party to the then-governmental majority, the Mauritius Labour Party of Sir Seewoosagur Ramgoolam. Highly repressive measures were taken against the MMM during the early 1970s.

In 1973, the MMM was split with Dev Virahsawmy creating a new party, the Mouvement Militant Mauricien Socialiste Progressiste (MMMSP). He was accompanied by some committed young friends-artists, among others: Bam Cuttayen, Micheline Virahsawmy, Rosemay Nelson, Nitish Joganah, Ram Joganah, Bruno Jacques and Lélou Ménwar, all of them committed singers and songwriters. They soon created a new music band, the "Grup Kiltirel Soley Ruz" (or "Soley Ruz").

The band, representative of the Mauritian youth protesting movement, quickly became very popular all round the island, especially among the working-class. Their politically engaged songs sounded as a hope signal message to the struggling population.

Nitish and Ram joganah

After several years of active militancy, Soley Ruz was finally dissolved in 1979 with most of its members starting solo careers.

His Mothers name Was G.Yat

=== Creation of Grup Latanier ===
After the dissolution of Soley Ruz, some of its members continued to militate. Ram Joganah and his brother Nitish Joganah decided to continue their fight against political and social injustice through music. By that time committed songs against political injustice as well as social and cultural banes had become a noteworthy means to raise people's consciousness.

On 19 November 1979, Ram and brother Nitish decided to create a new committed song band. They named it "Grup Latanier". They worked together with other artists to write and compose committed songs. Grup Latanier finally released their first album Krapo Kriyé in 1981.

== Discography ==
Since their first album in 1981, the Grup has never had a spell of more than three years without releasing an album.

- Krapo Kriyé (1981)
- Nuvo Simé (1982)
- Lapel lorizon (1985)
- Rapor Lepep (1987)
- Soley Ruz (1990)
- Yer,zordi,dimé (1993)
- Realité (1995)
- Ki Pozition? (1996)
- Frik (1999)
- Louk Louké (2002)
- Lavwa Lepep (2002)
- Souvenir enn lot sezon (2003)
- Kitpunu (2004)
- Lapo tanbour (2006)
- Lavwa Lepep (2009)is a reedition of Rapor Lepep (1987), released to celebrate the Group's 29th anniversary.
- Assé (2009)
- Balad Mizikal (2011)
- Tou Korek (2012)

Grup Latanier has also released various compilations of its best songs. In 2007 they released Kalkilé, a compilation of their most memorable songs. Nitish Joganah said about that album that it was "time to forget the past and start a new chapter. To start with another fight, a new form of resistance." Their next album is expected to reflect that change.

== Honors ==
In 2007, Grup Latanier was awarded the MASA Award Winners 2007 For Contribution in Music. The band Grup Latanier celebrated its 40th anniversary at a concert held at Caudan Arts Centre, Port Louis in August 2019. Various artists performed at the concert, including the Joganah brothers and Ram's son Gavin.
