= Kaya (Mauritian musician) =

KAYA
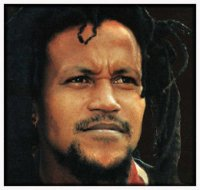

Background information
- Birth name: Joseph Réginald Topize
- Also known as: KAYA
- Born: 10 August 1960
- Origin: Mauritian
- Died: 21 February 1999 (aged 38)
- Genres: Seggae
- Instrument(s): Guitar, Vocals

Joseph Réginald Topize (10 August 1960 – 21 February 1999), popularly known by his stage name Kaya, was a Mauritian musician, and the creator of "seggae" - a fusion of Mauritian sega and reggae, two popular music genres in Mauritius. Kaya died while in police custody (purportedly beaten to death by the police), after being arrested for smoking marijuana during one of his concerts.

== Musical career ==
Topize was born in Roche-Bois in Port Louis on August 10, 1960, from a family of five children. He was left under the supervision of an uncle as his father, a fisherman, was unable to support his education. Topize did not have a very happy childhood. Being a Mauritian Creole, he was a young victim of racism and found himself left on his own to find odd jobs at the age of 8 years. At 16, he began to learn the guitar. He played hits from artists such as Mike Brant, Santana, and Deep Purple, and hosted dances and weddings with his first band, "Wind and Fire".

Topize adopted the name 'Kaya' soon after discovering Bob Marley and reggae music in homage to Marley's album of the same name. Kaya revered Marley and was heavily influenced by him both musically and politically.

Kaya decided to move away from his former music style covering pop-rock groups and became dedicated to both interpreting the music of Bob Marley. Spotted for his talents as a guitarist, he joined the group 'Lélou Menwar'. It was with them that Kaya performed in his first real concert and recorded his first studio album 'Letan Lenfer'.

After touring with Lélou Menwar, Kaya gathered some friends from his hometown, Roche-Bois, to create the group 'Racinetatan'; named after a Malagasy prince exiled in Mauritius. Kaya and Racinetatan incorporated many of Marley's hits into their performances along with heavily influenced reggae compositions of their own. However, over time Kaya began to question this with the concept of "roots & culture" in mind. Kaya began to see that though he loved reggae and Jamaican culture, this did not fit his reality in Mauritius. In 1986, fueled by his new thought process, Kaya began to mix reggae music in with the local music, Sega.

== Political action ==
Kaya campaigned for the rights of the Mauritian Creole people.

On February 16, 1999, the Republican Movement organised a free concert for the decriminalization of cannabis along Edward VII Street at Rose Hill. Five groups were playing, including Kaya.

Rama Valayden, the leader of the Republican Movement (MR), later nominated as Attorney General in 2005, opened the festivities with a speech in favor of the decriminalization of soft drugs, saying: "mo pou amène dépénalisation, sinon mo pas pou dans gouvernement" as reported by the local press. Valayden then asked the crowd for a show of hands in support of resolutions calling for the decriminalization, and appealed to then Prime Minister Navin Ramgoolam for those imprisoned for possession of marijuana to be amnestied. At the time, about 2000 people or 75% of the prison population were imprisoned for soft drugs offenses, with sentences ranging from several months to two years.

Two days after the event, police forces identified five people for smoking or encouraging the smoking of marijuana during the concert, and had them reprimanded. Kaya was among those arrested, and admitted to smoking the night of the concert. He was immediately imprisoned in the Alcatraz police cells, at Line Barracks (a detention center in Port Louis).

The police issued a request of 10,000 rupees (a considerable amount for the average Mauritian) for the release of the artist. Kaya's wife, aided by his fellow musicians and members of the MR (not including Valayden), managed to raise the bail money. However, due to various blunders of the lawyers involved, and especially a lack of political support for the MR, Kaya was not released on the expected date of February 20. Since this then led on to a weekend, his release date was postponed until the Monday. Kaya was then found dead in his cell on the morning of Sunday, February 21, 1999.

== Aftermath of Kaya's death ==
=== Contradictory results of autopsies ===
Official records state that Kaya, suffering from drug withdrawal, threw himself against the walls of his own cell and broke his skull in the process. A coroner from the neighbouring island of Reunion, Dr. Ramstein, contradicted this statement with his examination which claimed Kaya had been beaten to death.

=== Riots in Mauritius ===
Riots followed soon after news of Kaya's death, causing further deaths and social disorder which have been termed as the 1999 Mauritian riots.

=== 2005 state compensation of Rs 4.5 Millions ===
In late 2005 Véronique Topize, Kaya's wife and hairdresser as profession, received a compensation of Rs 4.5 Millions from the Government of Mauritius. Rama Valayden, who was then the nominated Attorney General of the PTR–PMXD–VF–MR–MMSM government, made an agreement with Véronique Topize's lawyer Rex Stephen. She thus dropped her original claim for Rs 10 Millions which lawyer Rex Stephen had initiated as a civil prosecution against the state.

=== 2019 revelations ===
In an interview with Daniella Grandcourt in 2019 Véronique Topize revealed that a psychic in France had predicted Kaya's premature death and subsequent riots in 1993.

== Discography ==
- Seggae nu la mizik, 1989
- Roots of Seggae,1990
- La paix universelle,1991
- Tansyon mové zintansyon,1992
- Seggae Man,1993
- Racine pé brilé,1994
- Ersatz of Bob Marley (Tribute to Bob Marley),1995
- Kaya chante Marley (Tribute to Bob Marley),1996
- Zistwar Revoltan,1996
- Mo la misik,1997
- Seggae Experience (Best Of Kaya),1998
- Mo Enkor La (Best of Kaya), 2007

== See also ==
- Seggae
- List of Mauritians
