= Rodrigues =

Autonomous outer island of Mauritius

Rodrigues Rodrigues (French) Rodrig (Morisyen)
- Autonomous outer island
- Flag Coat of arms
- Motto: "Travail, Solidarité, Fierté" (French) "Labour, Solidarity, Pride"
- Anthem: "Motherland"
- Location of Rodrigues in the Indian Ocean.
- Coordinates: 19°43′S 63°25′E
- Country: Mauritius
- Capital: Port Mathurin

Government
  - Body: Rodrigues Regional Assembly (autonomous since 12 October 2002)
  - Chief Commissioner: Johnson Roussety
  - Chief Executive: Jean-Claude Pierre-Louis
  - Minister for Rodrigues: Navin Ramgoolam

Area
  - Total: 108 km^{2} (42 sq mi)

Population (2014) (Note: Census of 2000)
  - Total: 41,669
  - Density: 386/km^{2} (1,000/sq mi)
- Demonym: Rodriguan

Languages (Note: In parliament English is official and French can be used.)
  - Vernacular languages: Rodriguan Creole; English; French
- Time zone: UTC+4 (MUT)
- ISO 3166 code: MU-RO
- Calling code: +230
- Currency: Mauritian rupee (MUR)
- Date format: dd/mm/yyyy (AD)
- Drives on: left
- Internet TLD: .mu

Rodrigues (French: Île Rodrigues [il ʁɔdʁiɡ]; Kreol rodrig: Rodrig) is an autonomous outer island of the Republic of Mauritius, of approximately 108 km^{2} (42 mi^{2}) and about 560 km (350 mi) east of the main island of Mauritius. Along with the French overseas department of Réunion, Rodrigues and Mauritius are part of the Mascarene Islands.

The Outer Islands of Mauritius are managed under the aegis of the Prime Minister of Mauritius through the Prime Minister's Office by the Outer Islands Development Corporation.

Of volcanic origin, Rodrigues is surrounded by coral reef and some tiny uninhabited islands that lie just off its coast. The tenth District of Mauritius until 2002, it was granted autonomous status and has since been managed by the Rodrigues Regional Assembly for its everyday governance. The capital and largest city is Port Mathurin and the island was home to around 41,669 inhabitants in 2014 according to Statistics Mauritius.

Its people, mostly of African descent, are Mauritian citizens and form part of the wider Mauritian Creole community. Its economy is based mainly on fishing, farming, handicraft and a developing tourism sector. The islands of Rodrigues, Agaléga and Saint Brandon form part of the larger territory of the Republic of Mauritius.

== Etymology and history ==
Rodrigues was named after Portuguese explorer Diogo Rodrigues, who first came upon the uninhabited island in 1528, under direction of Portuguese Viceroy Pedro Mascarenhas (namesake of the Mascarene Islands). Many maps also describe it as Diego Roiz. From the 10th century, Arabs are known to have visited the Mascarene Islands. The Cantino planisphere of c. 1500 and some other contemporary maps clearly show the three islands of the Mascarenes as Dina Arobi (or Harobi), Dina Margabin and Dina Moraze. These are apparently corrupted transliterations or transcriptions of the Arabic ديفا هاراب Diva Harab ("Desert Island"), ديفا مغربين Diva Maghrebin ("Western Island") and ديفا ماشريق Diva Mashriq ("Eastern Island"). While the second clearly refers to Réunion, sources disagree about which of the other is Mauritius and which one Rodrigues, which are both to the east of Réunion and arranged in a somewhat stylised way on these maps. However, even in its original state, Rodrigues had some karst, while Mauritius even after suffering 500 years of deforestation can by no means be called "desert" even in a colloquial sense.

The island was located again in February 1507. Part of the fleet of Afonso de Albuquerque and Tristão da Cunha, Diogo Fernandes Pereira's ship Cisne (Swan) spotted Réunion on 9 February after a cyclone had diverted their course forcing them to go around Madagascar, unlike the rest of the fleet. It has also been opined that this was due to a navigational error by Afonso de Albuquerque. The other two islands were subsequently rediscovered. The initial name was Diogo Fernandes; Domingo Froiz was given as a name some years later, and by 1528 it had been again renamed after the Portuguese navigator Dom Diogo Rodrigues and has remained so since. The orthography has been less stable at first, with the name being transcribed Diogo Rodríguez (Spanish maps), Diego Roiz, Diego Ruys (Dutch maps) (or even Diego Ruy's Island), Dygarroys or Bygarroys. Some early French sources called it Île Marianne.

Due to the island lying far off the beaten track of seafarers at that time, it received few visits. From 1601, the Dutch began visiting the island somewhat more regularly for fresh supplies of food. In 1691, the Huguenot François Leguat and seven companions landed on the island, intending to set up a farming colony of Protestant refugees. Farming was not successful, but there was an abundance of tortoises, turtles, birds, fish and other seafood.

During the 18th century, several attempts were made by the French to develop the island. African slaves (ancestors of the present population) were brought to Rodrigues to develop stock-breeding and farming. In 1735 a permanent French settlement was established, subordinated to Île Bourbon.

In 1809, after a brief battle with the French, British troops took possession of Rodrigues. After British occupation, slavery was eventually abolished in 1834. By 1843, the population had declined to a low of 250.

In 1883, the eruption of the Indonesian volcano Krakatoa was heard at Rodrigues Island and it is the furthest point, at almost 4,800 km (3,000 mi), at which the explosion was heard. The sound was described as "the roar of heavy guns". Naval ships were ordered to investigate as it was feared the sound was due to a ship in distress firing its guns. The noise remains the loudest sound in recorded history.

In September 1897, solo sailor Joshua Slocum spent eight days on the island. He would later write, "At Rodriguez one may now find every convenience for filling pure and wholesome water in any quantity. Governor Roberts having built a reservoir in the hills, above the village, and laid pipes to the jetty, where, at the time of my visit, there were five and a half feet at high tide. In former years well-water was used, and more or less sickness occurred from it. Beef may be had in any quantity on the island, and at a moderate price. Sweet potatoes were plentiful and cheap; the large sack of them that I bought there for about four shillings kept unusually well. I simply stored them in the sloop's dry hold. Of fruits, pomegranates were most plentiful; for two shillings I obtained a large sack of them, as many as a donkey could pack from the orchard, which, by the way, was planted by nature herself."

Early in 1968, HMS Cambrian, which was part of the Beira Patrol following the Unilateral Declaration of Independence of Rhodesia, was diverted to Rodrigues to quell a reported uprising by some of the populace. The uprising consisted of a number of individuals who had been arrested by the local authorities for breaking into a warehouse and appropriating a supply of sweet potatoes. Other locals went to the authorities and by violence released the arrested persons. At this point, it is believed that the authorities requested assistance which was provided by HMS Cambrian. On her early morning arrival, the ship's 4.5" guns were fired (with blanks, it is believed) and an armed landing party was provided. This resulted in the offenders being rounded up and imprisoned again.

== Geography ==
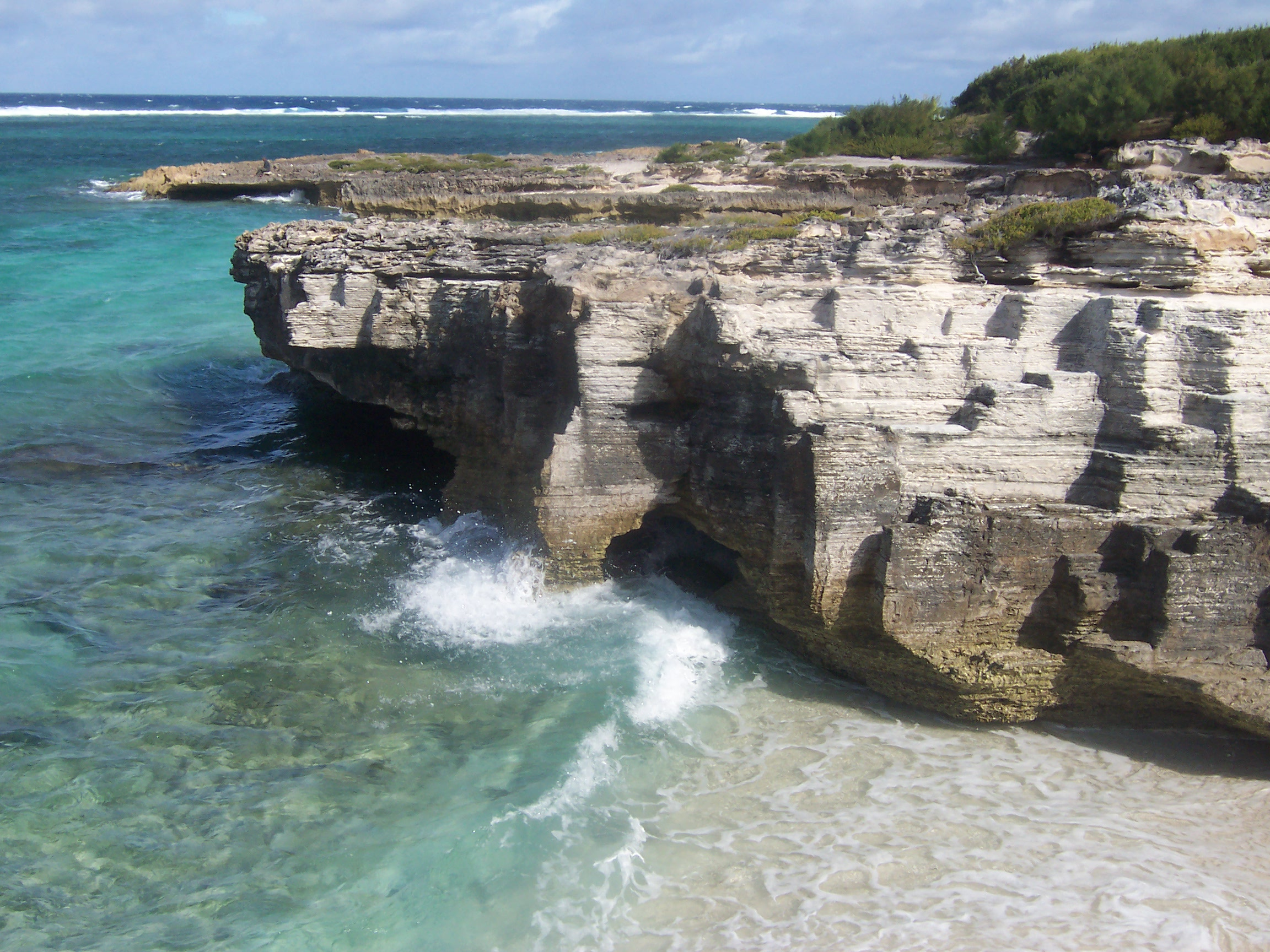
Calcarenitic shore of Rodrigues island, at Pointe Coton

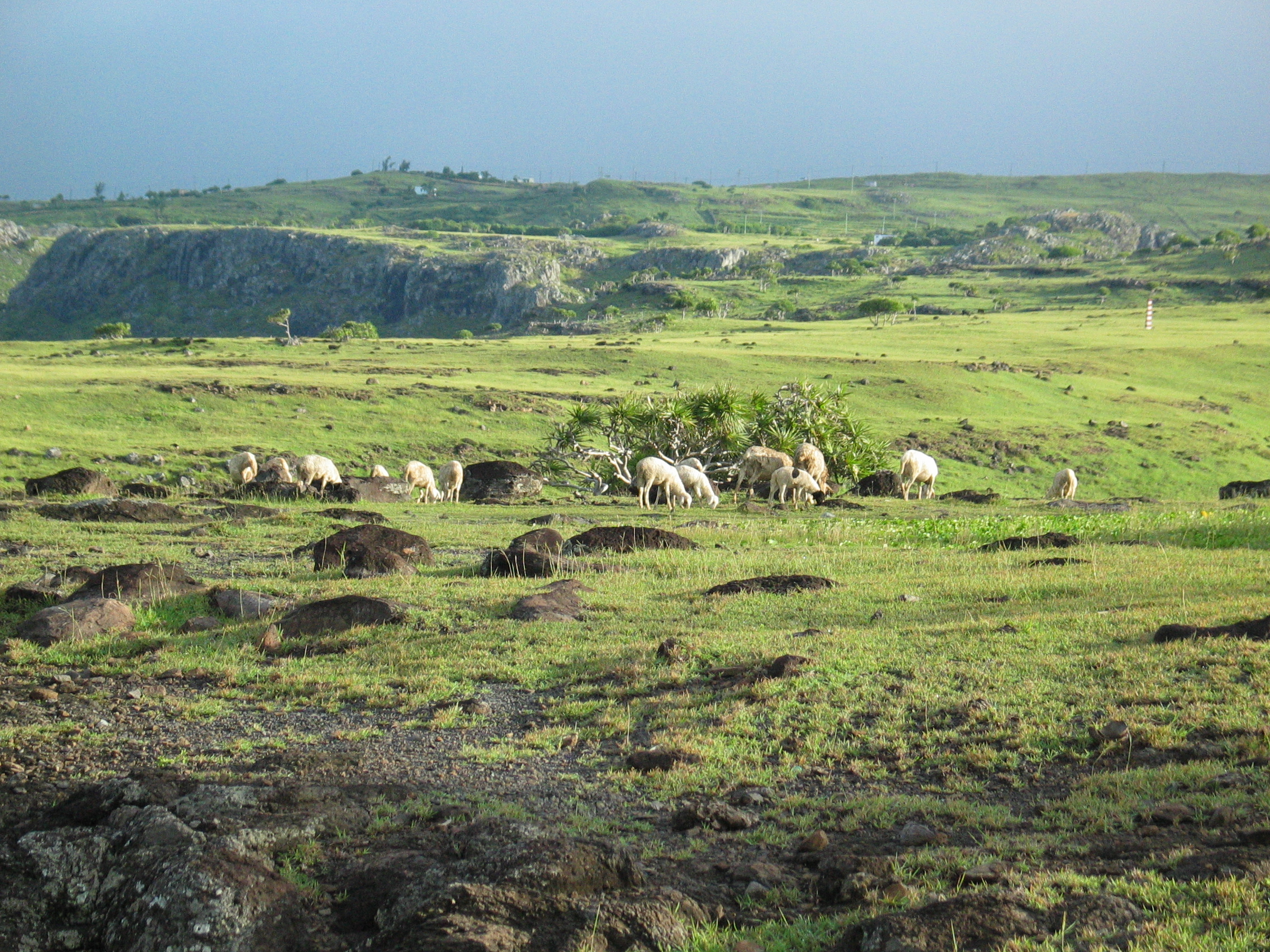
A treeless landscape from the island

Rodrigues is a volcanic island rising from a ridge along the edge of the Mascarene Plateau. The tectonically active Rodrigues Triple Point lies on the sea-floor nearby. Rodrigues is only 1.5 million years old, even if the plateau under the lagoon surrounding Rodrigues may be much more ancient than the island. Over time Rodrigues has developed a unique environment, including many endemic species.

Rodrigues is situated about 560 kilometres (350 mi) to the east of Mauritius. It is about 18 km (11 mi) long and 6.5 km (4.0 mi) wide with an area of 108 km^{2} (42 sq mi). The shape is that of a whale back with a central ridge and deep cut valleys. The island is hilly with a central spine culminating in the highest peak, Mont Limon at 398 m (1,306 ft). Rodrigues is the only Mascarene island with extensive limestone deposits and caves. A large fringing reef surrounds the island forming a lagoon within which lie eighteen small islets.

The coral reef of Rodrigues is of particular interest as it is self-seeding – it receives no coral zooplankton from elsewhere. This has led to an overall species-poor but highly adapted ecosystem. A species of coral, two species of Pomacentrus damselfish and many species of crustaceans are found only on Rodrigues' reefs.

=== Climate ===
The isolation and location of the island give a microclimate specific to Rodrigues, with two seasons. Rodrigues enjoys a mild tropical maritime climate with persistent trade winds blowing throughout the year. Mean summer temperature is 25.9 °C (78.6 °F) and mean winter temperature is around 22.3 °C (72.1 °F). January to March are the hottest months and August is the coolest month. The wettest month is February; September and October are the driest months. The climate is hotter and drier than in Mauritius. Cyclones may arise from November to April, and Rodrigues is more often hit than Mauritius.

Climate data for Rodrigues
Month	Jan	Feb	Mar	Apr	May	Jun	Jul	Aug	Sep	Oct	Nov	Dec	Year
Record high °C (°F)	33.9 (93.0)	34.0 (93.2)	33.9 (93.0)	33.0 (91.4)	30.9 (87.6)	30.9 (87.6)	30.4 (86.7)	31.2 (88.2)	30.7 (87.3)	30.9 (87.6)	30.9 (87.6)	33.1 (91.6)	34.0 (93.2)
Mean daily maximum °C (°F)	29.2 (84.6)	29.3 (84.7)	29.4 (84.9)	28.7 (83.7)	27.5 (81.5)	26.0 (78.8)	25.0 (77.0)	24.8 (76.6)	25.4 (77.7)	26.3 (79.3)	27.4 (81.3)	28.7 (83.7)	27.3 (81.1)
Mean daily minimum °C (°F)	23.6 (74.5)	23.8 (74.8)	23.7 (74.7)	23.0 (73.4)	21.6 (70.9)	20.1 (68.2)	19.1 (66.4)	18.8 (65.8)	19.3 (66.7)	20.1 (68.2)	21.3 (70.3)	22.8 (73.0)	21.4 (70.5)
Record low °C (°F)	18.4 (65.1)	19.8 (67.6)	19.0 (66.2)	18.4 (65.1)	18.1 (64.6)	16.5 (61.7)	14.5 (58.1)	15.2 (59.4)	15.8 (60.4)	16.5 (61.7)	17.2 (63.0)	19.2 (66.6)	14.5 (58.1)
Average precipitation mm (inches)	150.0 (5.91)	184.7 (7.27)	131.2 (5.17)	117.0 (4.61)	78.3 (3.08)	77.6 (3.06)	80.8 (3.18)	59.4 (2.34)	43.8 (1.72)	40.7 (1.60)	70.0 (2.76)	71.0 (2.80)	1,104.5 (43.48)
Average precipitation days (≥ 1.0 mm)	12	13	13	13	12	13	15	13	9	8	7	8	136
Average relative humidity (%)	79	81	80	79	75	74	75	74	74	74	76	77	76
Mean monthly sunshine hours	275.9	240.1	257.3	243.0	244.9	219.0	232.5	244.9	237.0	275.9	273.0	285.2	3,028.7
Mean daily sunshine hours	8.9	8.5	8.3	8.1	7.9	7.3	7.5	7.9	7.9	8.9	9.1	9.2	8.9
Source: Mauritius Meteorological Services

=== Biodiversity ===
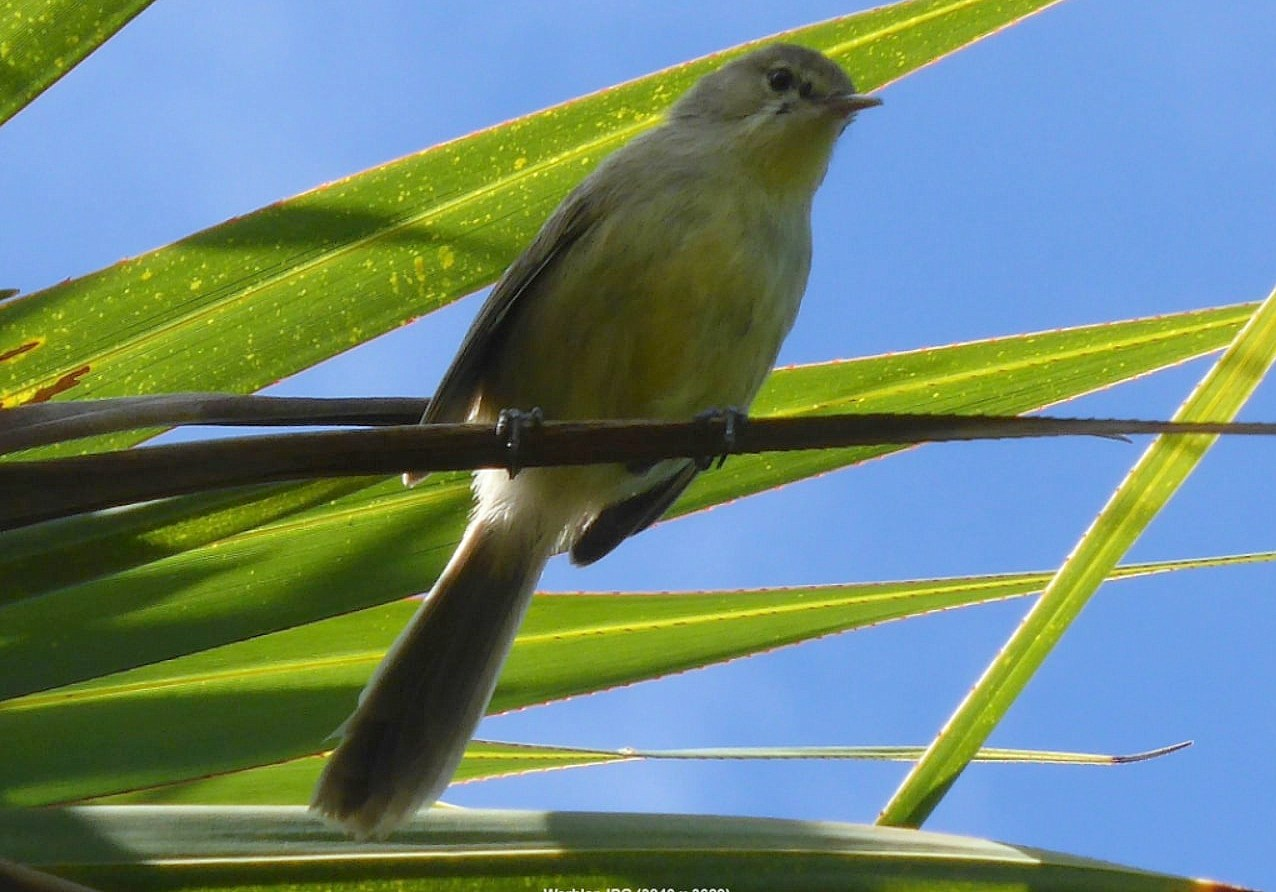
An endemic bird species, the Rodrigues warbler (Acrocephalus rodericanus) in the Grande Montagne area, Rodrigues

Rodrigues was characterised by endemic plant and animal species in abundance, but much of its biodiversity has been eradicated since the 17th century. The island was home to two now-extinct endemic giant tortoises, a domed species (Cylindraspis peltastes), and a saddle-backed species (C. vosmaeri), and such birds as the Rodrigues solitaire (Pezophaps solitaria), a giant flightless pigeon closely related to the dodo of Mauritius, and the Rodrigues night heron (Nycticorax megacephalus). An endemic species of bat, the Rodrigues flying fox, is currently listed as endangered on the IUCN Red List. There are two remaining endemic bird species: the Rodrigues fody and the Rodrigues warbler, both are listed as near threatened.

To restore some forest areas, Grande Montagne, Anse Quitor (with neighbouring François Leguat Giant Tortoise Reserve) and two islets, Île aux Sables and Île aux Cocos have been declared nature reserves (under the Forest and Reserves Act 1983). Endangered plants on the reserves include Zanthoxylum paniculatum, Polyscias rodriguesiana, Badula balfouriana, and Gouania leguatii.

== Government and politics ==
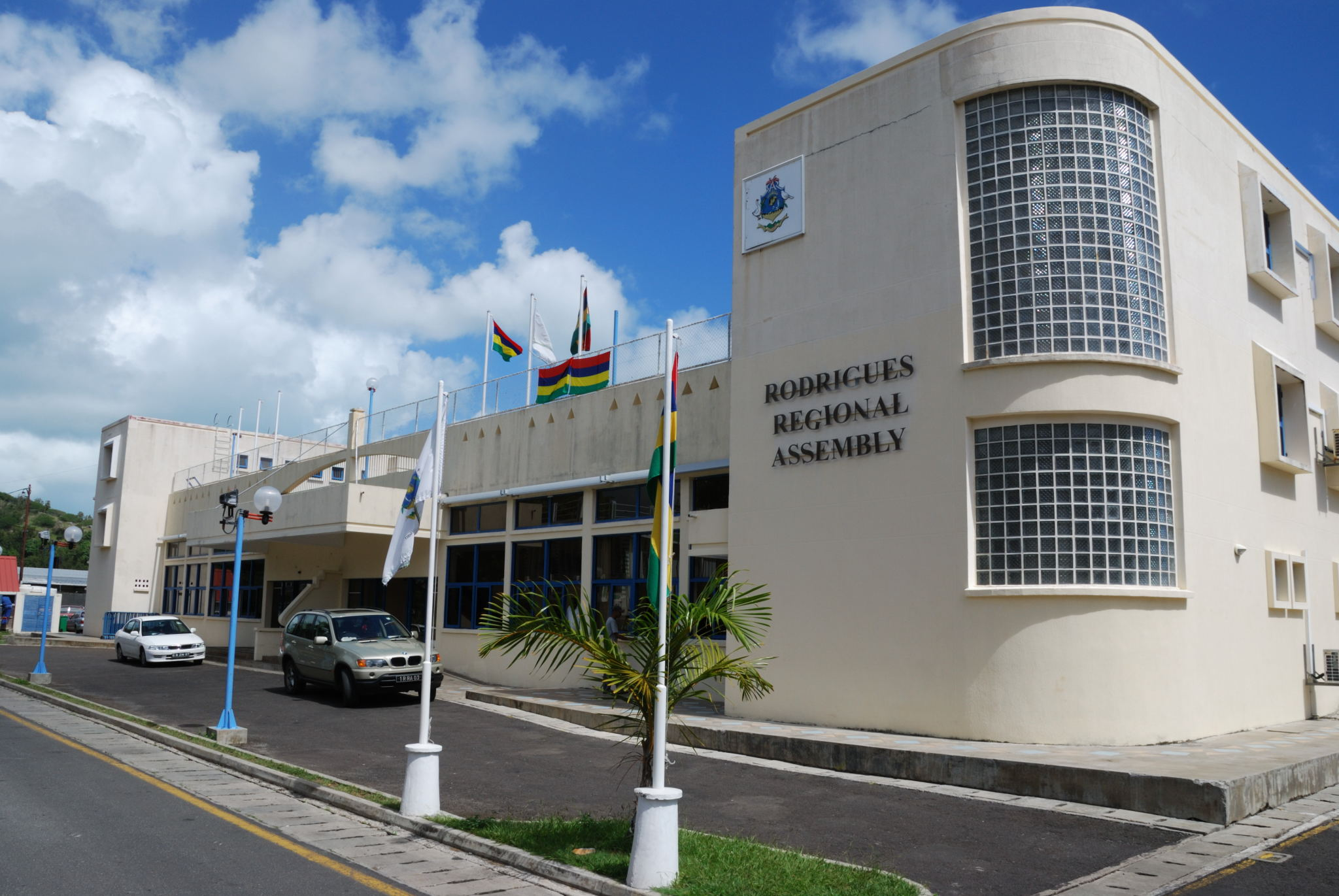
Rodrigues Regional Assembly

The island of Rodrigues is a constituency of the Republic of Mauritius and is dependent on the latter. However, on 20 November 2001, the Mauritius National Assembly unanimously adopted two laws giving Rodrigues its autonomy, creating a decentralised government system. This new legislation has allowed the implementation of a regional assembly in Rodrigues constituting 18 members and an executive council headed by a Chief Commissioner. The council meets every week to make decisions, draw up laws and manage the budget. The Chief Commissioner has the main task of informing the Mauritian Prime Minister of the management of the island's concerns. The last election of the Rodriguan Regional Assembly was held on 27 February 2022. The Alliance (UPR/MIR/PSMD/FPR ) party was the winner and obtained nine seats, while the Organisation du Peuple de Rodrigues (OPR) obtained eight. The President acts as head of state and the Chief Commissioner as head of government on Rodrigues. The current chief commissioner is Johnson Roussety and the Chief Executive of Rodrigues is Pierre Louis Jean Claude.

=== Electoral regions ===
The island includes six electoral regions: La Ferme (Region 1), Marechal (Region 2), Saint Gabriel (Region 3), Baie aux Huitres (Region 4), Port Mathurin (Region 5) and Grande Montagne (Region 6). Rodrigues Regional Assembly election are held every five years.

=== Zones ===
Rodrigues is divided into 14 municipalities or zones. For statistical purposes, the zones are further subdivided into a total of 182 localities. The zones have between a minimum of six localities (La Ferme) and maximum of 22 (the capital Port Mathurin).

Zone Nr.	Municipality	Population
5	Port Mathurin	5,929
8	Lataniers-Mont Lubin	3,806
9	Petit Gabriel	3,658
12	Rivière Cocos	2,893
10	Mangues-Quatre Vents	2,870
11	Plaine Corail-La Fouche Corail	2,832
13	Port Sud-Est	2,717
4	Oyster Bay	2,594
7	Roche Bon Dieu-Trèfles	2,059
14	Coromandel-Graviers	1,944
1	Piments-Baie Topaze	1,445
2	La Ferme	1,112
3	Baie Malgache	1,076
6	Grand Baie-Montagne Goyaves	844
	Rodrigues	35,779

== Demographics ==
The population estimate (as of 18 November 2022) for the island of Rodrigues was 43,650. The main religion is Christianity, dominated by Roman Catholicism with small minorities of other Christian branches, as well as Jehovah's Witnesses, and there are also Hindus, Muslims and Buddhists. Most of the inhabitants are of African descent and there is a minority of mixed-race peoples, descendants of the first European settlers.

The main language is Rodriguan Creole, but English and French are most used as the languages of government administration, the courts and business. Rodriguan Creole is very similar to Mauritian Creole, though some words are pronounced differently. People born in Rodrigues island are called Rodriguans.

== Education ==
The education system in Rodrigues is similar to that throughout the rest of Mauritius. The government provides free education to students up to the tertiary level. English is the main medium of education.

== Transportation ==
Rodrigues is served by Sir Gaëtan Duval Airport in Plane Corail, with regular flights to Sir Seewoosagur Ramgoolam International Airport in Plaisance.

== Economy ==
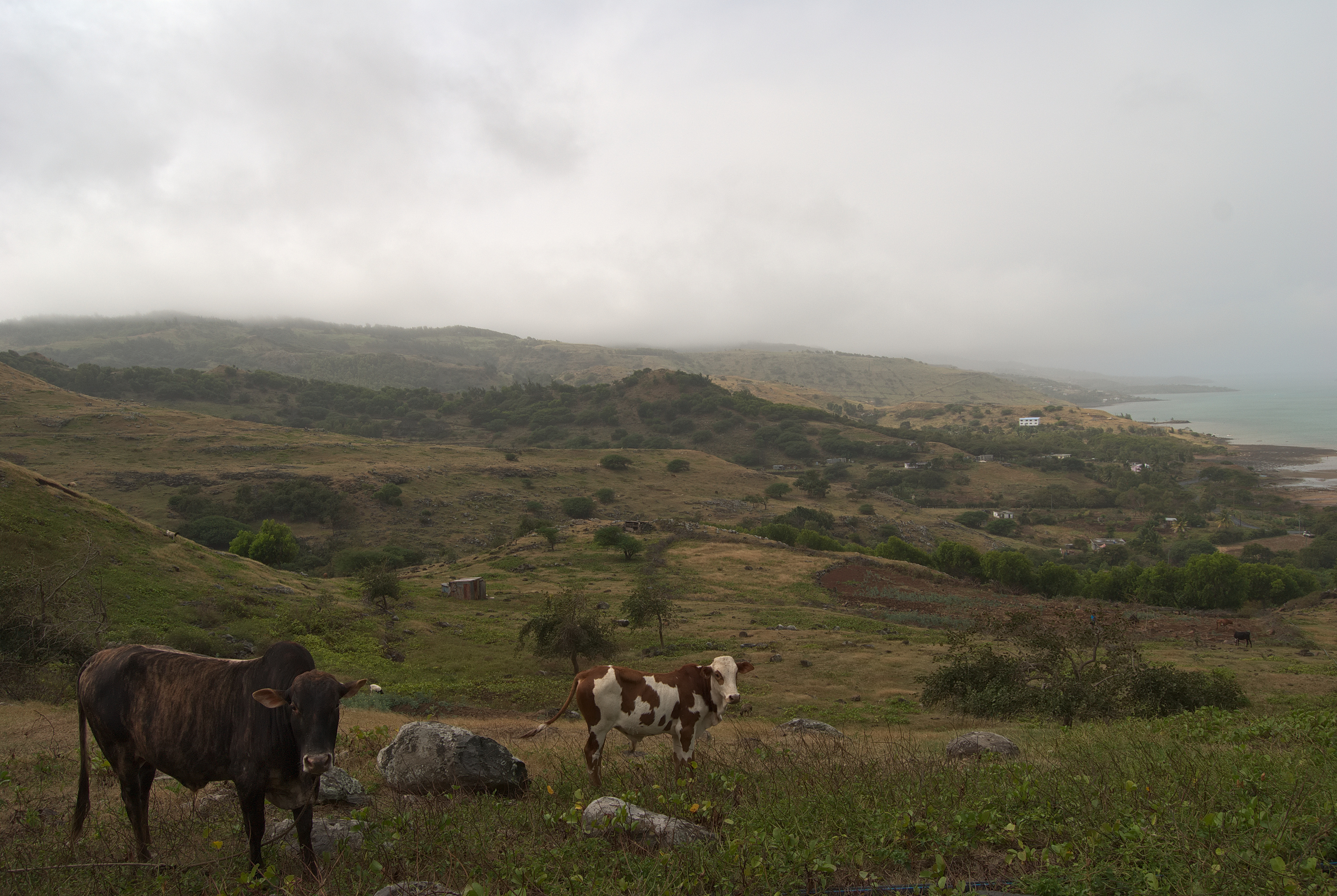
Small-scale cattle rearing contributes to the economy of Rodrigues.

The economy of Rodrigues is mostly dependent on Mauritius. The main sources of income and economic activity are tourism, fishing, agriculture (especially of onions, garlic and chilli), and animal rearing. The handicraft industry has proven to be beneficial to the economy of the island. However, the income derived from the export of sea products, cattle, and food crops is smaller than the costs of imported products, creating a deficit. It has a special relationship with English-speaking countries, such as England in the United Kingdom, Australia and Ireland.

As of 2020, Gross National Income per capita was approximately $16,400.

== Culture ==
Cultural awakening which occurred at the end of the 1970s allowed the construction and consolidation of the cultural identity of Rodrigues through the development of these various elements, which form the base of the culture of every nation: food, music, and crafts

=== Music and folklore ===
The traditional music of the island is known as Sega Tambour. The music has an accentuated beat, usually accompanied by an accordion, clapping and the use of improvised percussion instruments like bamboo. The folk dance music is similar to polkas, quadrilles, waltzes and Scottish reels.

=== Cuisine ===
Rodrigues cuisine consists of dishes from local products: fruit, vegetables, seafood (fish, octopus, crab, shrimp, lobster) and meat. National dishes include sausages with kreolinės, rougaille sauce, octopus with curry, kono-kono (a shellfish) salad and Rodrigues cake.

=== Sports ===
The most common sport in Rodrigues is association football. There are local competitions almost throughout the year and in specific competitions, the winning team travels to Mauritius for sport exchange. Volleyball is also popular. There is also a public swimming pool at Marechal, a village located in the center of the island, and a stadium at Camp Du Rois in the region of Port Mathurin.

Amateur radio operators occasionally run DXpeditions on Rodrigues. The 3B9RF expedition operated there during November 2015.

=== Museum ===
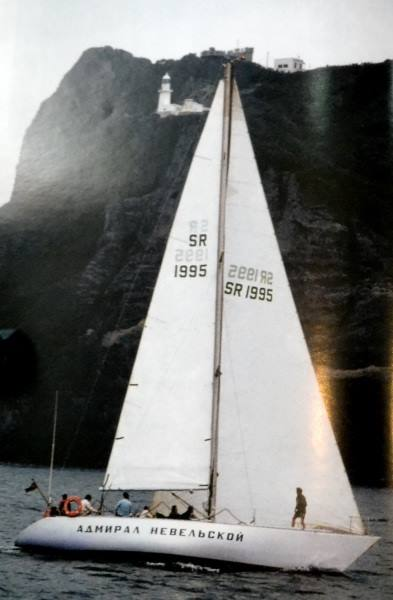
Admiral Nevelskoi in earlier service

In 2010, plans were developed by Bernard Eric Typhis Degtyarenko for a private museum on the island, centred on the restoration of the yacht Admiral Nevelskoi. The hull of the yacht, belonging to the Maritime State University in Vladivostok, Russia, had been found drifting off Rodrigues in 1997 and brought ashore.

== Sustainability ==
Since 2014, Rodrigues Island has been proactive in environmental conservation, banning plastic bags to safeguard its marine and terrestrial biodiversity. Building on this success and with positive reception from the community, the island extended its eco-friendly measures by prohibiting single-use polystyrene food containers four years later, garnering global acclaim. These efforts complement various initiatives dedicated to preserving the island's unique ecosystem.

Crucial among these initiatives is the establishment of reserves, notably the Grande Montagne Nature Reserve at the island's center, harboring indigenous fauna and flora. The reserve is vital for monitoring endemic plants such as the 'café maron' and 'bois blan,' as well as unique bird species like the Rodriguan Warbler and Rodriguan Fody.

On the western part of Rodrigues, the Francois Leguat Giant Tortoise and Cave Reserve contributes to the rehabilitation of tortoises, including the Radiated and Aldabra species. Since 2006, the reserve has been a stalwart in tortoise conservation, now housing over 5,000 tortoises within its 20 hectares. The reserve features a unique landscape of limestone formations, including nine caves and dolines. One highlight is the Grande Caverne, outfitted with raised walkways, steps, and eco-friendly lighting. It is the only electrified "Show Cave" in the Southwest Indian Ocean, designed to meet international standards with the expertise of an Australian cave consultant.

'Ile aux Cocos,' another reserve, serves as a protected habitat for seabirds. Through guided tours, visitors gain insights into the destination's preservation efforts. Additionally, a sponsorship campaign for reptiles is available at the reserve.

Even during the challenging times of the COVID-19 crisis, the island exhibited resilience. The local government, along with tourism sector workers, contributed to environmental protection. From cleaning hiking paths to restoring islets, these collective efforts upheld Rodrigues' conservation efforts.

Tourists played a pivotal role through the Tourism Livelihood Scheme, providing immediate positive impacts. Continuing its ecological journey, Rodrigues Island launched the 'One Visitor, One Tree' initiative in March 2023. This entails planting a tree for every traveler in order to expand indigenous forest ecosystems. As a model for active involvement in environmental protection, this project fosters an ecological mindset among both tourists and locals.

== Notable people ==
- Category:People from Rodrigues
