= Ravanne =

Membranophone similar to the tambourine

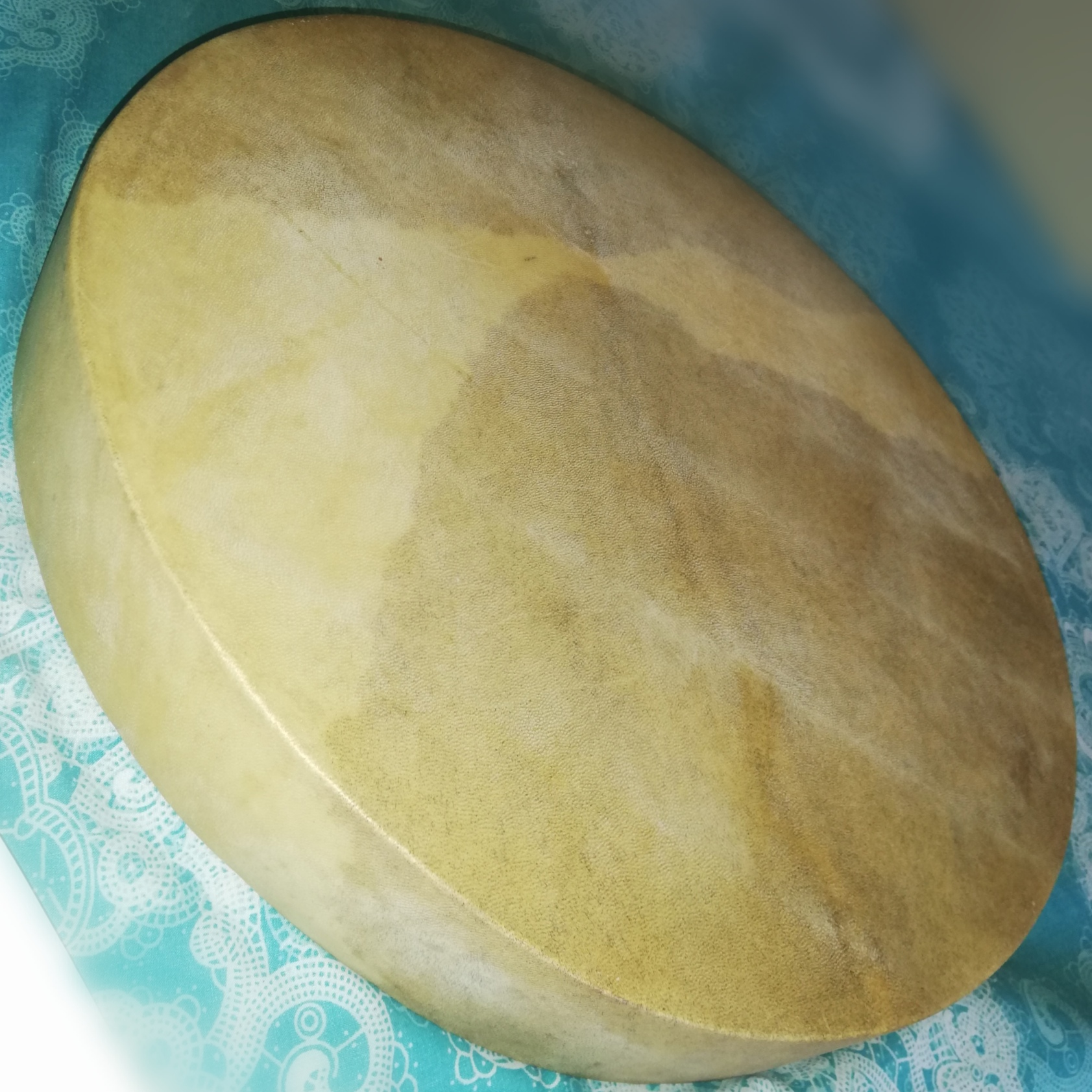

Percussion instrument
- Classification: Membranophone
- Developed: During slavery in Mauritius 17th century

The ravanne is a large tambourine-like instrument used in sega music of Mauritius. It is made out of goat skin called “lapo cabri” (in Mauritian Creole) which usually needs to be heated up before playing. The ravanne is used as the main rhythm in sega music and has been played by the great contributors of the Sega (genre) . One of the main contribution for the ravanne is a book written in 1999 called “Méthode de ravanne”: Ways of playing the "ravanne", traditional music instrument by Menwar (Stéphano Honoré) Throughout the time the traditional ravanne has evolved to more modern ravanne types using different materials and manufacturing techniques. It is commonly used for entertainment mainly in the tourist industry and common family gatherings all around the island.
