= Seggae =

Mauritian fusion genre of sega and reggae music

Seggae is a fusion genre of sega, the traditional music of the Mascarene Islands, and reggae. While early recorded precursors of the style date back to 1974 with the group Creolites' track "Regsegae Kung Fu", the genre was formally developed, named, and popularised in Mauritius in the mid-1980s by the musician Kaya. It eventually became popular across the Mascarene Islands and remains one of the most prominent music genres in Mauritius.

== Precursors ==
While Joseph Réginald Topize (Kaya) is widely credited with popularizing and formalizing seggae as a distinct musical movement in the mid-1980s, early records indicate the fusion concept was documented a decade prior. In 1974, a London-based Mauritian group called Creolites, featuring brothers Jean-Antoine, Mario, and Chico Bernard, together with Daniel Bêche and Noël Cécile, released a privately pressed 7-inch vinyl in Mauritius. The record featured the track "Regsegae Kung Fu" (backed with "Immigrants débarqués"), which blended traditional sega with the emerging sounds of early reggae (blue beat). The track became a massive hit among Mauritian youth, selling nearly 15,000 copies and topping the local pop charts in 1974.

== Origin ==
The genre was formally established and popularised in the mid-1980s by the Mauritian Rastafari singer Joseph Reginald Topize who was commonly known as Kaya, after a song title by Bob Marley. He campaigned for rights of the Mauritian Creole people. Kaya died in prison in 1999. Kaya was the most important and most well-known artist in the genre, and was often dubbed "Bob Marley of Seggae".

A popular Réunionese seggae musician is Baster.

== Composition of seggae music ==
Seggae music, just as reggae music, can be composed of either just a guitar, or if played by a band, its instrumentation can include drums, a rhythm guitar, a solo guitar, a keyboard, a bass, percussions and a singer. Unlike reggae, seggae is played at a 6/8 (common time) tempo, and with 138 to 140bpm, just like sega music. Unlike sega music, the rhythmic guitar is played with an offbeat rhythm and the drum's one drop rhythm is faster than in reggae. Nowadays, seggae artists tend to slow down the bpm to give the music a more heavy and soulful touch.
