= List of Seychellois people =

This is a list of notable Seychellois people:

== Academics ==
- Guy Lionnet – former director of agriculture and writer of many works on the history and flora and fauna of Seychelles
- Gaston Labat – physician and pioneer in regional anaesthesia

== The arts ==
- Antoine Abel – writer, sometimes referred to as father of Seychellois literature
- Sandra Esparon – singer
- Sonia Grandcourt – writer
- Regina Melanie – writer
- Laurence Norah – travel photographer, writer (including blogger)
- Jean-Marc Volcy – musician

== Business ==
- Kantilal Jivan – businessman

== Political figures ==
- Joseph Belmont – vice-president of Seychelles (2004–2010)
- Collin Dyer – National Assembly member
- Danny Faure – president of Seychelles (2016–2020)
- Gérard Hoarau – murdered London-based political dissident
- Hardy Lucas – former member of the National Assembly of Seychelles
- Sir James Mancham – president of Seychelles (1976–1977)
- Vincent Meriton – vice-president of Seychelles (2016–2020)
- James Michel – president of Seychelles (2004–2016)
- Claude Morel – representative to the United Nations
- David Pierre – member of the National Assembly
- Patrick Pillay – foreign minister of Seychelles (since 2005)
- Wavel Ramkalawan – started as leader of the Seychelles National Party and is an Anglican priest as well as the president of Seychelles from 2020 to 2025
- Linda Ramkalawan – First Lady of Seychelles from 2020 to 2025
- France-Albert René – prime minister (1976–1977) and president (1977–2004) of Seychelles
- Satya Naidu – first Hindu member of Seychelles National Assembly

== Law ==
- Jacques Hodoul – justice of the Seychelles Court of Appeal
- Francis Chang-Sam – former attorney general, now private legal practitioner
- Dar Lyon – chief justice of the Seychelles and first-class cricketer

== Sports ==
- Ronny Hoareau – footballer
- Eddy Maillet – FIFA international football referee
- Lorenzo Mathiot – footballer
