= Music of Seychelles =

Collective term for the dances, rhythms and styles of music from Seychelles

Seychelles, which is an independent island chain in the Indian Ocean, has a distinct kind of music. Folk music incorporates multiple influences in a syncretic fashion, including English contredanse, polka and mazurka, French folk and pop, sega from Mauritius and Réunion, taarab, zouk, soukous, moutya and other pan-African genres, as well as Polynesian and Indian music. A complex form of percussion music called Kanmtole is popular, along with combinations of Sega and Reggae called Seggae and combinations of Moutya and Reggae called Mouggae, as is Montea, a fusion of native folk rhythms with Kenyan benga developed by Patrick Victor. Jean Marc Volcy is another famous Seychellois musician who has brought a modern touch to traditional music. He has several albums including Sove Lavi.

The growth of Seychelles music has since seen the adoption of a blend of contemporary reggae and mainstream, international popular music.

== See also ==
- List of Seychellois musicians
