= Lazare Picault =

18th-century French explorer

Lazare Picault (fl. mid-18th century) was a French explorer known for his exploration of islands in the Seychelles. Although Arab, Portuguese and British sailors visited the Seychelles prior to Picault, he was the first to do any extensive exploration.

== Exploration ==
In 1742 on an expedition of exploration of the Indian Ocean, Picault discovered the largest island of the Seychelles which he named L’Île d’Abondance (Isle of Abundance). Also a smaller island to the east he called Ste. Anne Island, named after Saint Anne's Day (the date of his landing there).

In 1744 he returned to the Seychelles and renamed the largest island Mahé after Mahé de La Bourdonnais, the governor of Réunion and Mauritius, who was in charge of the mission. He also named the entire island group, Iles de la Bourdonnais. This was changed to Sechelles in 1756, in honour of the French Minister of Finances, Jean Moreau de Séchelles.

In 1744 Picault also explored several other islands in the archipelago, including:

- La Digue: Which he calls Ìle Rouge because of its reddish granite boulders. In 1768 it is named La Digue, after the name of a ship in the fleet of the explorer Marc-Joseph Marion du Fresne.
- Praslin: Which Picault calls Isle de Palmes because of the large tracts of palm forests on the island. In 1768 it is changed in honour of the diplomat César Gabriel de Choiseul, duc de Praslin.
- Fregate Island: Named Fregate due to the large number of frigatebirds he finds on the island.

== Legacy ==
Today on the island of Mahé there are several locales named after him. A bay, beach, village, administrative district and tourist hotel are all called Baie Lazare.
