= Glacis (disambiguation) =

Glacis may refer to:

- Glacis, in military engineering is an artificial slope as part of a medieval castle or in early modern fortresses.
- Glacis, Seychelles, the district in Seychelles
- Glacis United, football club in Gibraltar
