= List of Seychellois musicians =

This is a list of notable Seychellois musicians.

To be included in this list, the person must have a Wikipedia article.

== Musicians ==
=== A–J ===
- Jean-Marc Volcy – composer, songwriter
- Dezil' – band (featuring Sandra Esparon as a member)
- Sandra Esparon – singer and performer

== See also ==
- Music of Seychelles
