= Mamelles Island =

Island in Seychelles

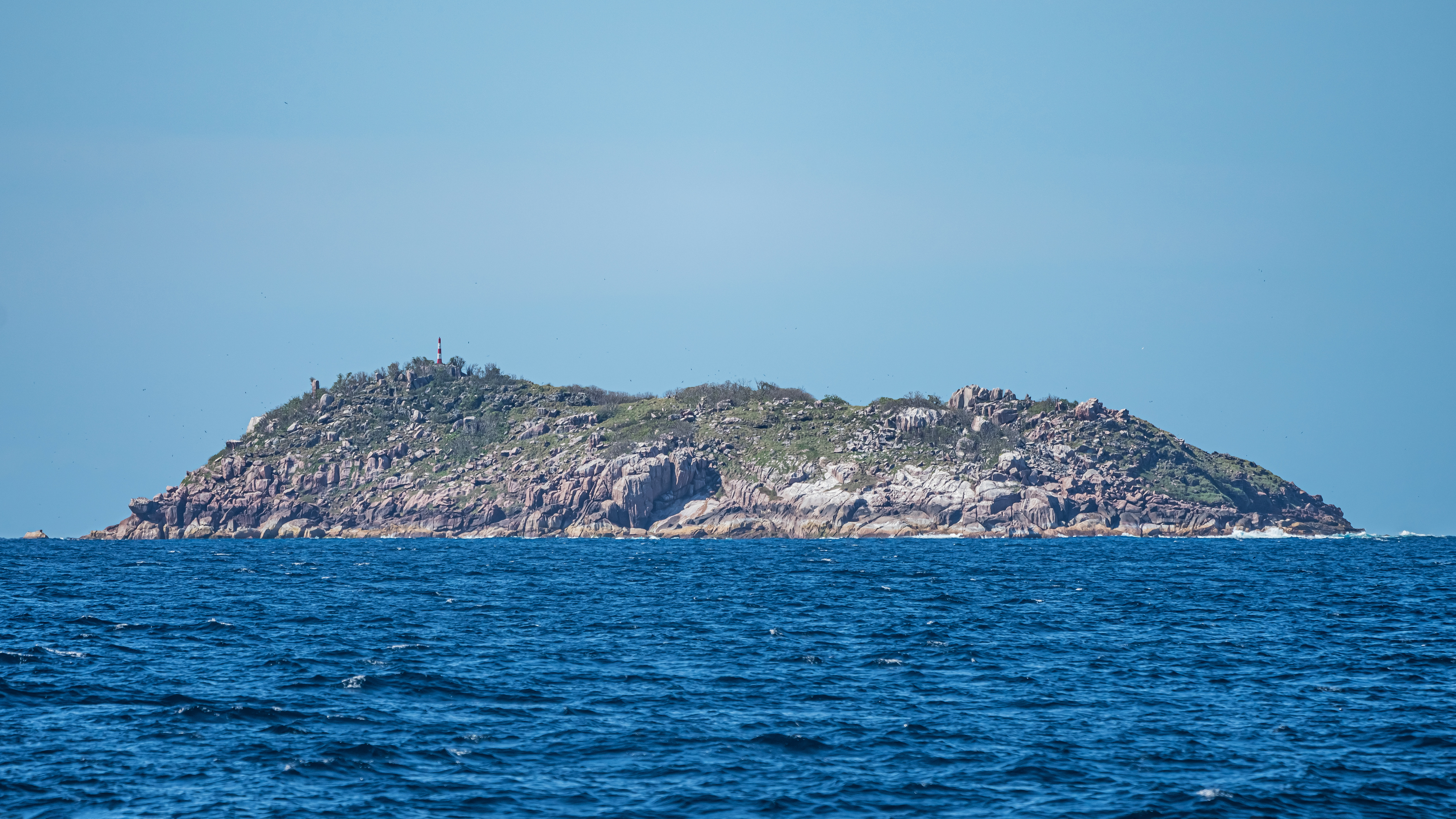

- Location within Seychelles

Geography
- Location: Seychelles, Indian Ocean
- Coordinates: 4.48°S 55.54°E
- Archipelago: Inner Islands, Seychelles
- Adjacent to: Indian Ocean
- Total islands: 1
- Major islands: Mamelles
- Area: 0.06 km^{2} (0.023 sq mi)
- Length: 0.3 km (0.19 mi)
- Width: 0.2 km (0.12 mi)
- Coastline: 1.1 km (0.68 mi)
- Highest elevation: 42 m (138 ft)
- Highest point: south hill

Administration
- Seychelles
- Group: Inner Islands
- Sub-Group: Granitic Seychelles
- Sub-Group: Mahe Islands
- Districts: Glacis

Demographics
- Population: 0 (2014)
- Pop. density: 0/km^{2} (0/sq mi)
- Ethnic groups: Creole, French, East Africans, Indians.

Additional information
- Time zone: SCT (UTC+4)
- ISO code: SC-12
- Official website: www.seychelles.travel/en/discover/the-islands/

Mamelles is an island in Seychelles, lying 14 kilometres (8.7 mi) northeast of Mahe. It is uninhabited and has an area of 6 hectares (15 acres).

== Geography ==
Mamelles Island is a granite island with a length of 300 metres (980 ft), a width of 210 metres (690 ft), covered with little vegetation. The fauna of the island is represented only by wild rabbits and sea birds, including terns, which nest on the island.

The name of the island comes from the French word «mamelles», which means "breast". This strange island was called because of its shape - two high hills in the south and the north, and a relatively deep hollow between them. On the southern hill, which is slightly higher than the north, There is a lighthouse which was constructed in 15 December 1911. On the shores of the island, the wreck of the tanker Ennerdale from 1970, which is a favorite dive site.

== Gallery ==
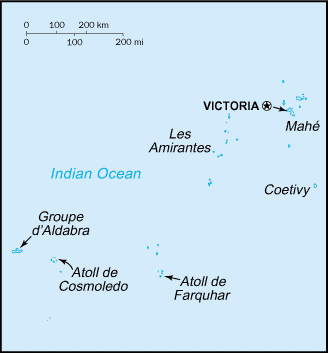
Map 1

Map 2

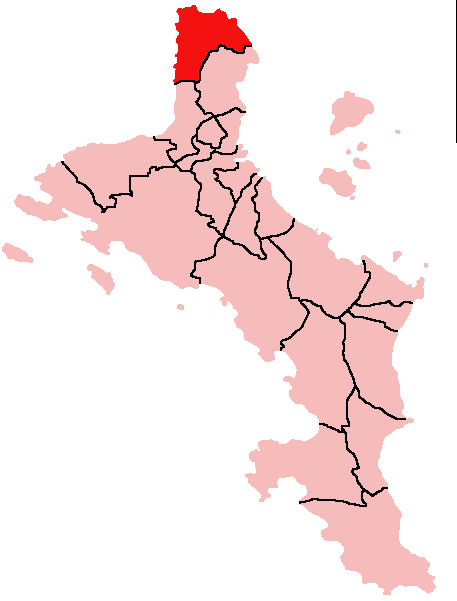
District Map
