= American Society of Regional Anesthesia and Pain Medicine =

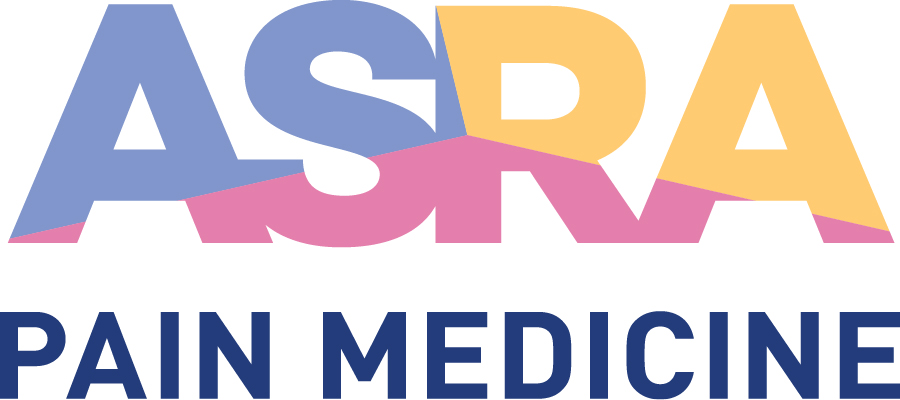
- Logo of the society

- Emblem of the society
- Abbreviation: ASRA
- Formation: Initial (1923-1940) Reestablished (1975)
- Purpose: To advance the science and practice of regional anesthesia and pain medicine to improve patient outcomes through research, education, and advocacy.
- Headquarters: Pittsburgh, Pennsylvania, United States
- Fields: Anesthesia, Regional Anesthesia, Pain Medicine
- Key people: Gaston Labat, Alon P. Winnie, L. Donald Bridenbaugh Jr, Harold Carron, P. Prithvi Raj, Jordan Katz
- Website: https://asra.com/
- Formerly called: American Society of Regional Anesthesia

The American Society of Regional Anesthesia and Pain Medicine (ASRA) is a professional medical society dedicated to advancing the practice of regional anesthesia and pain medicine through education, research, and advocacy. Founded in 1923 and reestablished in 1975, it is one of the largest subspecialty societies in anesthesiology.

== History ==
=== Founding and early years (1923–1940) ===
The original ASRA was founded in 1923 by Gaston Labat, a Seychellois physician often called the "father of regional anesthesia and pain medicine" in the United States. Labat, who collaborated with Mayo Clinic co-founder Charles Mayo, developed a regional anesthesia training program at Bellevue Hospital through New York University. The society initially focused on advancing local, regional, and spinal anesthesia techniques for surgical procedures.

In 1930, Philip Woodbridge presented at an ASRA meeting on therapeutic nerve blocks for chronic pain, marking a shift toward incorporating pain management into the society’s scope. Despite innovations in the 1930s, ASRA declined in activity by the end of the decade, leading to its dissolution in 1940. Members were encouraged to join the American Society of Anesthesiologists (ASA).

=== Reestablishment (1975–present) ===
In 1973, Alon Winnie proposed reviving ASRA as an educational organization. With collaborators Harold Carron, Jordan Katz, Donald Bridenbaugh, and P. Prithvi Raj, the society was reestablished in 1975. The first official meeting in 1978 attracted over 300 members.

=== Inclusion of pain medicine ===
In November 2021, ASRA updated its abbreviated name to ASRA Pain Medicine, accompanied by a refreshed logo and visual identity. The change reflected the society’s expanded interdisciplinary focus on the full spectrum of pain medicine, including acute, perioperative, and chronic pain, as well as its growing membership of specialists across anesthesiology, physiatry, neurology, and psychiatry.

== Journal ==
Regional Anesthesia and Pain Medicine
- Discipline: Regional anesthesia; Pain medicine
- Language: English
- Edited by: Brian D. Sites

Publication details
- History: 1976–present
- Publisher: BMJ
- Frequency: monthly
- Impact factor: 5.1 (2024)

Standard abbreviations
- ISO 4: Reg. Anesth. Pain Med.

Indexing
- CODEN: RAPMFX
- ISSN: 1098-7339 (print); 1532-8651 (web)
- OCLC no.: 45496086

Links
- Journal homepage

Since 1976, the monthly academic journal Regional Anesthesia and Pain Medicine has served as the society's official publication, as well as the official publication of the European Society of Regional Anaesthesia and Pain Therapy, the Asian and Oceanic Society of Regional Anesthesia, the Latin American Society of Regional Anesthesia, and the African Society for Regional Anesthesia. The current editor is Brian D. Sites.
