= Eden Island, Seychelles =

Artificial island in Seychelles

Eden Island
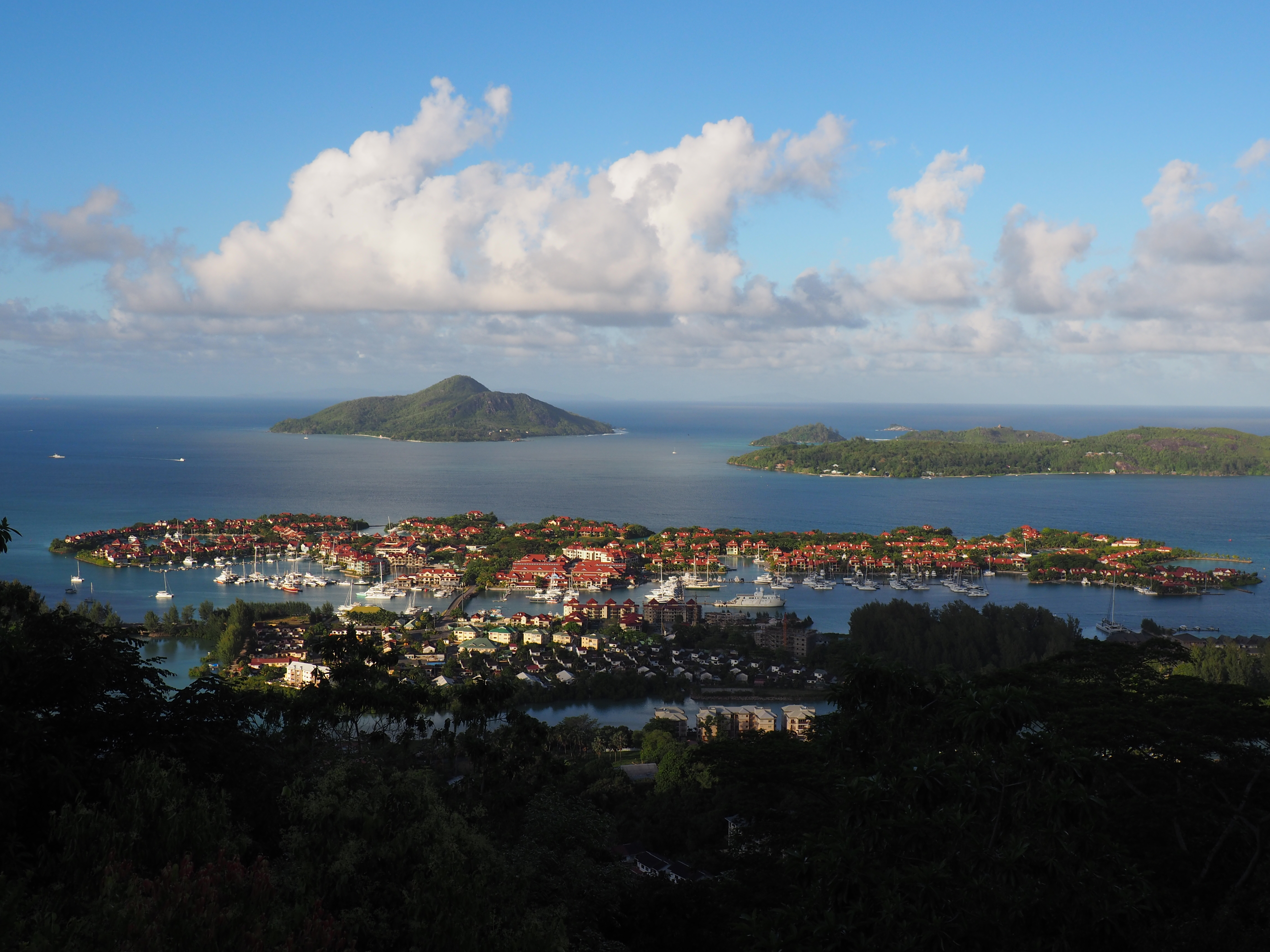
- View of Eden Island, 2022

- Location within Seychelles

Geography
- Location: Seychelles, Indian Ocean
- Coordinates: 4°38′S 55°29′E
- Archipelago: Inner Islands, Seychelles
- Adjacent to: Indian Ocean
- Total islands: 1
- Major islands: Eden
- Area: 0.57 km^{2} (0.22 sq mi)
- Length: 1.35 km (0.839 mi)
- Width: 0.6 km (0.37 mi)
- Coastline: 5.5 km (3.42 mi)
- Highest elevation: 5 m (16 ft)

Administration
- Seychelles
- Group: Granitic Seychelles
- Sub-Group: Mahe Islands
- Sub-Group: Mahe Port Islands
- Districts: Roche Caiman
- Largest settlement: Eden (pop. 1000)

Demographics
- Population: 1000 (2014)
- Pop. density: 1,754/km^{2} (4543/sq mi)
- Ethnic groups: Creole, French, East Africans, Indians.

Additional information
- Time zone: SCT (UTC+4)
- ISO code: SC-25
- Official website: www.edenisland.sc

Eden Island is an artificial island in Seychelles, lying 3.5 km from the capital Victoria.

== History ==
The island was created artificially during the 2000s. It belongs to the Mahe Port Islands, which are mostly artificial islands created by funds from Dubai when the Dubai dredger was placed in Seychelles.

== Geography ==
The island has many protected bays and beaches.

Map of Eden Island

== Administration ==
The island belongs to Roche Caiman District.

== Tourism ==
Today, the island's main industry is tourism, and it is known for its big hotel, the Eden Bleu.

The island is featured as the home port of the yacht in the third season of the reality show Below Deck Down Under.

== Transport ==
The island hosts a small port and a yacht marina.

== Cuisine ==
Fish and other sorts of seafood are the main ingredients.

== Image gallery ==
Map 1

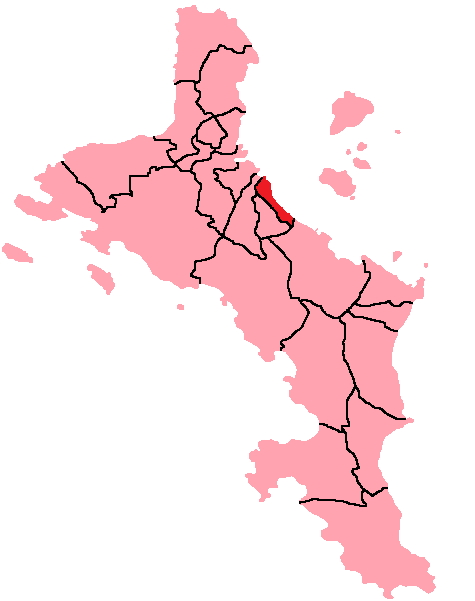
District Map

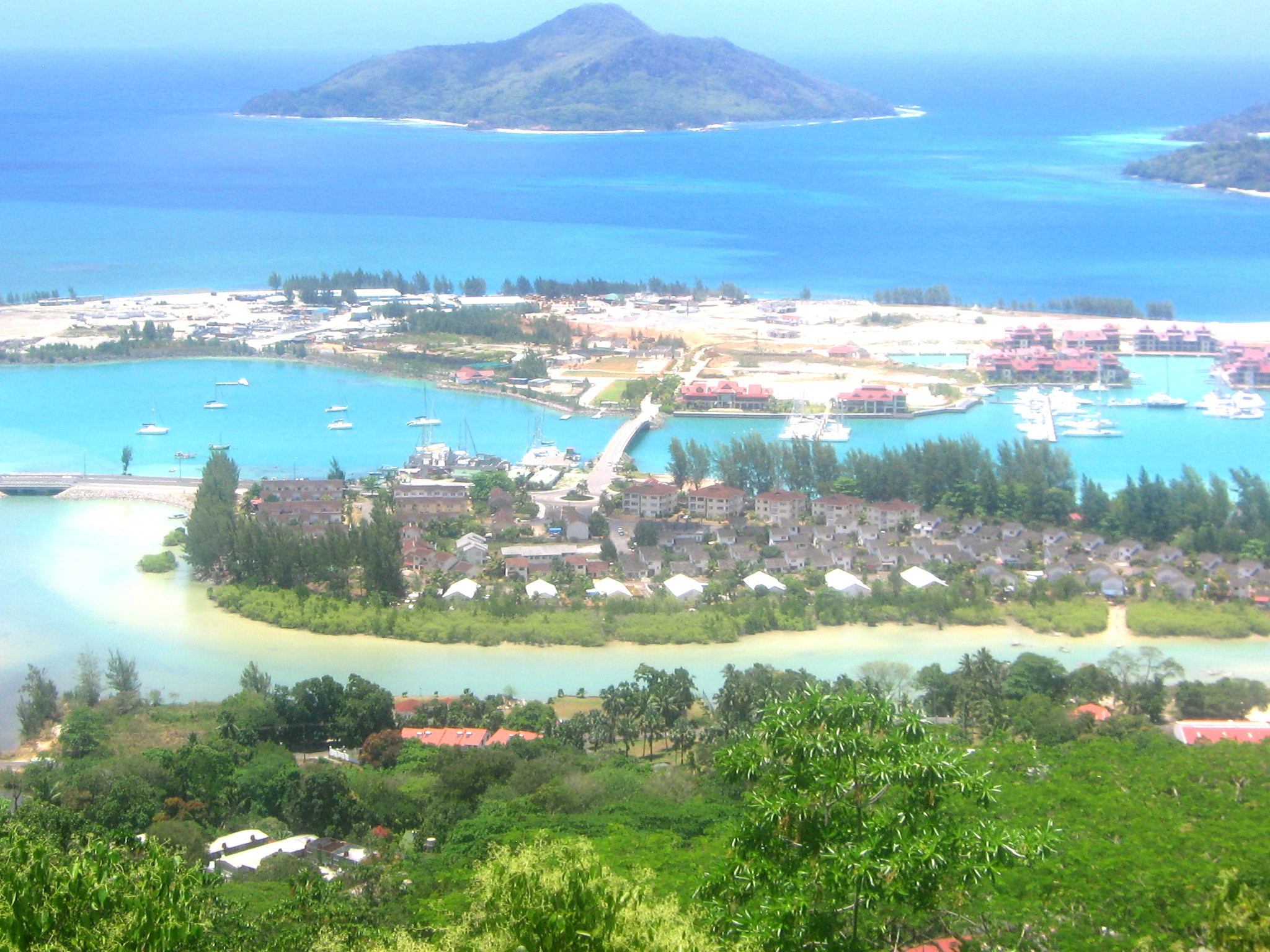
Eden Island, Mahe, 2008
