= Regina Melanie =

Seychellois writer and poet

Regina Melanie (August 29, 1932 – March 1, 2016) was a Seychellois writer and poet. She was heavily involved in efforts to document and promote Seychellois Creole.

== Biography ==
Regina Melanie was born in 1932 in the Baie Lazare district of Seychelles. Her education was cut short while she was still in primary school. She was told that because she was Black, she would be restricted to blue-collar labor, so there was no need for her to learn to read. Melanie worked as a manual laborer and cleaner. She went on to have eight children. In the early 1980s, she became one of the first participants in the "Progranm alfabetizasyon" literacy program. Through the program, she was able to learn to write in English, French, and Seychellois Creole.

Melanie began writing poetry and short stories in Seychellois Creole. She became a well-known writer on the island, considered a pioneer in Seychellois Creole literature. Her work was included in the anthologies Bardzour in fer and Madanm Mizlen e konpani. In 2012, she published her own book, Remor, through the island's Creole Institute. She also helped the institute's work to document local idioms and sayings, and was involved in its efforts to produce a Creole dictionary. In addition, Melanie was involved in the Komite Lalang Kreol, which works to preserve and promote Seychellois Creole, and served as its dean until her death.

Melanie died in 2016 at age 83. In 2017, the Creole Institute and its partners launched a prize for school-age writers named in her honor. In 2019, she was featured in Seychellois Writers: A Biographical Sketch, an overview of the island's literary figures by Diallo Addourahamane.
