= Guy Lionnet =

Seychellois academic

- Born: 31 May 1922; Curepipe, Mauritius
- Died: 30 November 2007 (aged 85)
- Citizenship: Mauritian-Seychellois
- Occupations: agronomist, naturalist, linguist, playwright
- Known for: playwright
- Notable work: Wrote a book titled 'The Seychelles'

Guy Lionnet was a Mauritian-Seychellois agronomist, naturalist, linguist, playwright and historian. He was born in Curepipe Mauritius on 31 May 1922, the son of Joseph Félix Lionnet (1898–1968) and Marguerite Marie Raymonde Commins (1900–1933) and settled in Seychelles in 1945 as a young professional while the country was still a British colony. He was Seychelles' first non-British Director of Agriculture and has contributed much to conservation in Seychelles as chairman of many conservation agencies including the Seychelles Islands Foundation . Lionnet was a prolific writer on Seychelles history and Seychelles flora and fauna and served as Seychelles' Honorary Consul to Republic of Madagascar.

In 1984, Mauritian botanist Deva Duttun Tirvengadum, a former director of the Mauritius Institute, renamed the endemic plant mangliye gran bwa as Glionnetia sericea, in honour of Guy Lionnet.

In 1987 Lionnet was named to the Global 500 Roll of Honour by the United Nations Environment Programme as the person, "responsible for the creation of several national parks and the protection of endangered species in the Seychelles." They also note that he successfully campaigned for the proclamation of the Aldabra Atoll as a World Heritage Site.

Guy Lionnet died on 30 November 2007 at the age of 85.

== Bibliography ==
- A short history of Seychelles , 1972
- The romance of a Palm: Coco-de-mer, 1973
- Striking Plants of Seychelles, 1979
- Diksyonner Kreol-Franse: Dictionnaire Creol Seychollois-Francais (Kreolische Bibliothek) with Danielle D'Offay, 1982

== Books ==
The Seychelles
