= Seychelles =

Island country in the Indian Ocean

Republic of Seychelles République des Seychelles (French) Repiblik Sesel (Seselwa Creole French)
- Flag Coat of arms
- Motto: Finis Coronat Opus (Latin) "The End Crowns the Work"
- Anthem: Koste Seselwa "Unite Seychellois"
- Location of Seychelles (dark blue) – in Africa (light blue & dark grey) – in the African Union (light blue)
- Capital and largest city: Victoria; 4°37′S 55°27′E
- Official languages: Seychellois Creole; English; French
- Minority language: Tamil
- Ethnic groups: 97% Seychellois Creoles (Note: Native and predominant ethnic group of the country; the creoles trace their mixed origin to mainland East African ethnicities and the Malagasy. They account for vast majority of the population.); 3% others (Note: Non-Seychellois minority ethnic groups include smaller pockets of ethnic French, Indian, Chinese, and Arab peoples.)
- Religion (2022): 74.9% Christianity; 5.4% Hinduism; 2.4% Islam; 5.1% other; 12.2% not stated
- Demonyms: Seychellois; Seychelloise; Seselwa (Creole)
- Government: Unitary presidential republic
  - President: Patrick Herminie
  - Vice-President: Sebastien Pillay
  - Speaker of the National Assembly: Azarel Ernesta
- Legislature: National Assembly

Independence from the United Kingdom
  - Independence declared: 29 June 1976

Area
  - Total: 457 km^{2} (176 sq mi) (181st)
  - Water (%): Negligible

Population
  - 2024 estimate: ▲121,355 (200th)
  - Density: 262.3/km^{2} (679.4/sq mi) (67th)
- GDP (PPP): 2026 estimate
  - Total: ▲$4.490 billion (177th)
  - Per capita: ▲$43,850 (49th)
- GDP (nominal): 2026 estimate
  - Total: ▲$2.250 billion (186th)
  - Per capita: ▲$21,940 (50th)
- Gini (2019): 32.1 medium inequality
- HDI (2023): ▲0.848 very high (54th)
- Currency: Seychellois rupee (SCR)
- Time zone: UTC+04:00 (SCT)
- Calling code: +248
- ISO 3166 code: SC
- Internet TLD: .sc

Seychelles (Note: Treated as singular or plural. The presence of the definite article ("the Seychelles") also varies.) (/seɪˈʃɛl(z)/, /ˈseɪʃɛl(z)/; French: [sɛʃɛl] or [seʃɛl]), officially the Republic of Seychelles (French: République des Seychelles; Seychellois Creole: Repiblik Sesel), is an archipelagic country consisting of 115 islands in the Indian Ocean. Its capital and largest city, Victoria, is 1,500 kilometres (800 nautical miles) east of mainland Africa. Nearby island countries and territories include the Maldives, Comoros, Madagascar, Mauritius, and the French overseas departments of Mayotte and Réunion to the south; and the Chagos Archipelago to the east. Seychelles is the smallest country in Africa as well as the least populated sovereign African country, with an estimated population of 100,600 in 2022.

The Seychelles archipelago was uninhabited prior to sustained external contact. Arab sailors knew of the islands through Indian Ocean trade routes and they are described in medieval Arabic books. In the 16th century, Europeans described the islands, but they remained without permanent settlement until the 18th century, when France formally claimed them. During the period of French colonization, enslaved Africans were brought to the islands for plantation labor; many had already been captured and enslaved through existing African-Arab slave trade or Indian Ocean slave trade.

It faced competing French and British interests until it came under full British control in the early 19th century. After Britain assumed control, slavery was abolished and later replaced in part by indentured laborers from India. Since proclaiming independence from the United Kingdom in 1976, it has developed from a largely agricultural society to a market-based diversified economy, characterized by service, public sector, and tourism activities. From 1976 to 2015, nominal GDP grew nearly 700%, and purchasing power parity nearly 1600%. Since the late 2010s, the government has taken steps to encourage foreign investment.

As of the early 21st century, Seychelles has the highest nominal per capita GDP and the highest Human Development Index ranking of any African country. According to the 2024 V-Dem Democracy indices, Seychelles is the 43rd-ranked electoral democracy worldwide, the 1st-ranked liberal democracy in Africa, and the 2nd-ranked electoral democracy on the continent. Seychellois culture and society is an eclectic mix of French, British, Indian and African influences, with infusions of Chinese elements. The country is a member of the United Nations, the African Union, the Southern African Development Community, and the Commonwealth of Nations.

== History ==
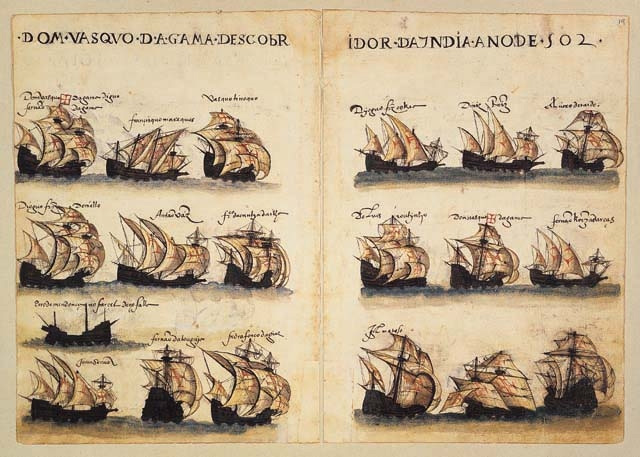
The first Europeans to discover the Seychelles were the 4th Portuguese India Armada, led by Vasco da Gama.

Seychelles, Praslin, Silhouette, and others adjacent islands in the Indian Ocean, by Captain D. Crichton, 1751 - 25 July 1774

=== Early history ===
al-Mahrī describes the Zarīn islands (from Persian zarrīn 'golden'), saying that there are seven islands, and that the surrounding water is green and contains algae. Based on the navigational information given by al-Mahrī, scholars have identified the Zarīn islands with the Seychelles. The islands were uninhabited, and the Muslim graves at Anse Lascars on Silhouette Island probably date to recent centuries. Simulations of migration patterns indicate a good probability that Austronesians visited the islands.

Europeans learnt of the Seychelles in the early 16th century, with the voyages of Vasco da Gama and his 4th Portuguese India Armada; the first sighting was made by Thomé Lopes aboard Rui Mendes de Brito on 15 March 1503. Da Gama's ships passed close to an elevated island, probably Silhouette Island, and the following day Desroches Island. Later, the Portuguese mapped a group of seven islands and named them The Seven Sisters. The earliest recorded landing was in January 1609, by the crew of the Ascension under Captain Alexander Sharpeigh during the fourth voyage of the British East India Company.

A transit point for trade between Africa and Asia, the islands were said to be occasionally used by pirates until the French began to take control in 1756 when a Stone of Possession was laid on Mahé by Captain Corneille Nicholas Morphey. The islands were named after French politician Jean Moreau de Séchelles, and were formally part of the colony of Isle de France. In August 1770, the French ship Thélémaque under Captain Leblanc Lécore landed 15 white settlers and 13 African and Indian slaves on Ste. Anne Island.

During the French Revolutionary Wars, the Royal Navy frigate HMS Orpheus under Captain Henry Newcombe arrived at Mahé on 16 May 1794. Jean-Baptiste Quéau de Quinssy, the senior administrator in the Seychelles, refused to resist Orpheus and instead successfully negotiated with the British, resulting the islands remaining under French control as "neutral" territory. After British forces completed their invasion of Isle de France in December 1810, they assumed control over the Seychelles, which was formalised in the 1814 Treaty of Paris that ended the War of the Sixth Coalition. Seychelles became a separate crown colony from Mauritius in 1903. Elections in Seychelles were held in 1966 and 1970.

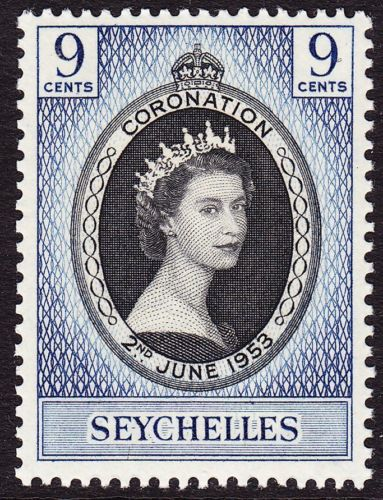
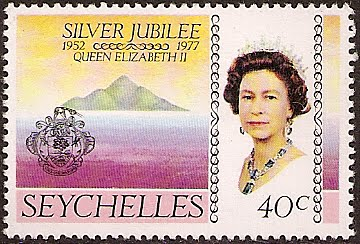
Seychellois stamps with portrait of Queen Elizabeth II

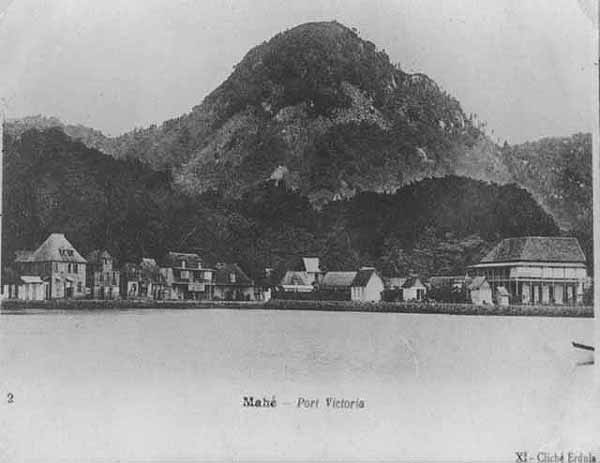
Victoria, Seychelles 1900s

=== Independence ===
In 1976, Seychelles gained independence from the United Kingdom as a republic. It is a member of the Commonwealth. In the 1970s Seychelles was "the place to be seen, a playground for film stars and the international jet set". In 1977, a coup d'état by France-Albert René ousted the first president of the republic, James Mancham. René discouraged over-dependence on tourism and declared that he wanted "to keep Seychelles for the Seychellois".

The 1979 constitution declared a socialist one-party state, which lasted until 1991.

In the 1980s there were a series of coup attempts against President René, some of which were supported by South Africa. In 1981, Mike Hoare led a team of 43 South African mercenaries masquerading as holidaying rugby players in the 1981 Seychelles coup d'état attempt. There was a gun battle at the airport, and most of the mercenaries later escaped in a hijacked Air India plane. The leader of this hijacking was German mercenary D. Clodo, a former member of the Rhodesian SAS. Clodo later stood trial in South Africa (where he was acquitted) as well as in his home country Germany for air piracy.

In 1986, an attempted coup led by the Seychelles Minister of Defence, Ogilvy Berlouis, caused President René to request assistance from India. In Operation Flowers are Blooming, the Indian Navy's Nilgiri-class frigate Vindhyagiri arrived in Port Victoria to help avert the coup.

The first draft of a new constitution failed to receive the requisite 60% of voters in 1992, but an amended version was approved in 1993.

In January 2013, Seychelles declared a state of emergency when the tropical cyclone Felleng caused torrential rain, and flooding and landslides destroyed hundreds of houses.

Following the coup in 1977, the president always represented the same political party until the October 2020 Seychellois general election, which was historic in that the opposition party won. Wavel Ramkalawan was the first president who did not represent United Seychelles (the current name of the former Seychelles People's Progressive Front).

In January 2023, Seychelles announced its final stages of completing its marine spatial plan. It would become the second largest ocean area at 1.35 million km^{2} (520,000 sq mi) behind Norway, in support of its blue economy.

In October 2025, presidential runoff was won by former parliamentary speaker and main opposition leader, Patrick Herminie, meaning Herminie's party, United Seychelles (US) returned to power. On 26 October 2025, Patrick Herminie was sworn in as Seychelles' sixth president.

== Politics ==
The Seychelles president, who is head of state and head of government, is elected by popular vote for a five-year term of office. The cabinet is presided over and appointed by the president, subject to the approval of a majority of the legislature. As of 2026, the president is Patrick Herminie.

The unicameral Seychellois parliament, the National Assembly or Assemblée Nationale, consists of 35 members, 26 of whom are elected directly by popular vote, while the remaining nine seats are appointed proportionally according to the percentage of votes received by each party. All members serve five-year terms.

The Supreme Court of Seychelles, created in 1903, is the highest trial court in Seychelles and the first court of appeal from all the lower courts and tribunals. The highest court of law in Seychelles is the Seychelles Court of Appeal, which is the court of final appeal in the country.

=== Political culture ===
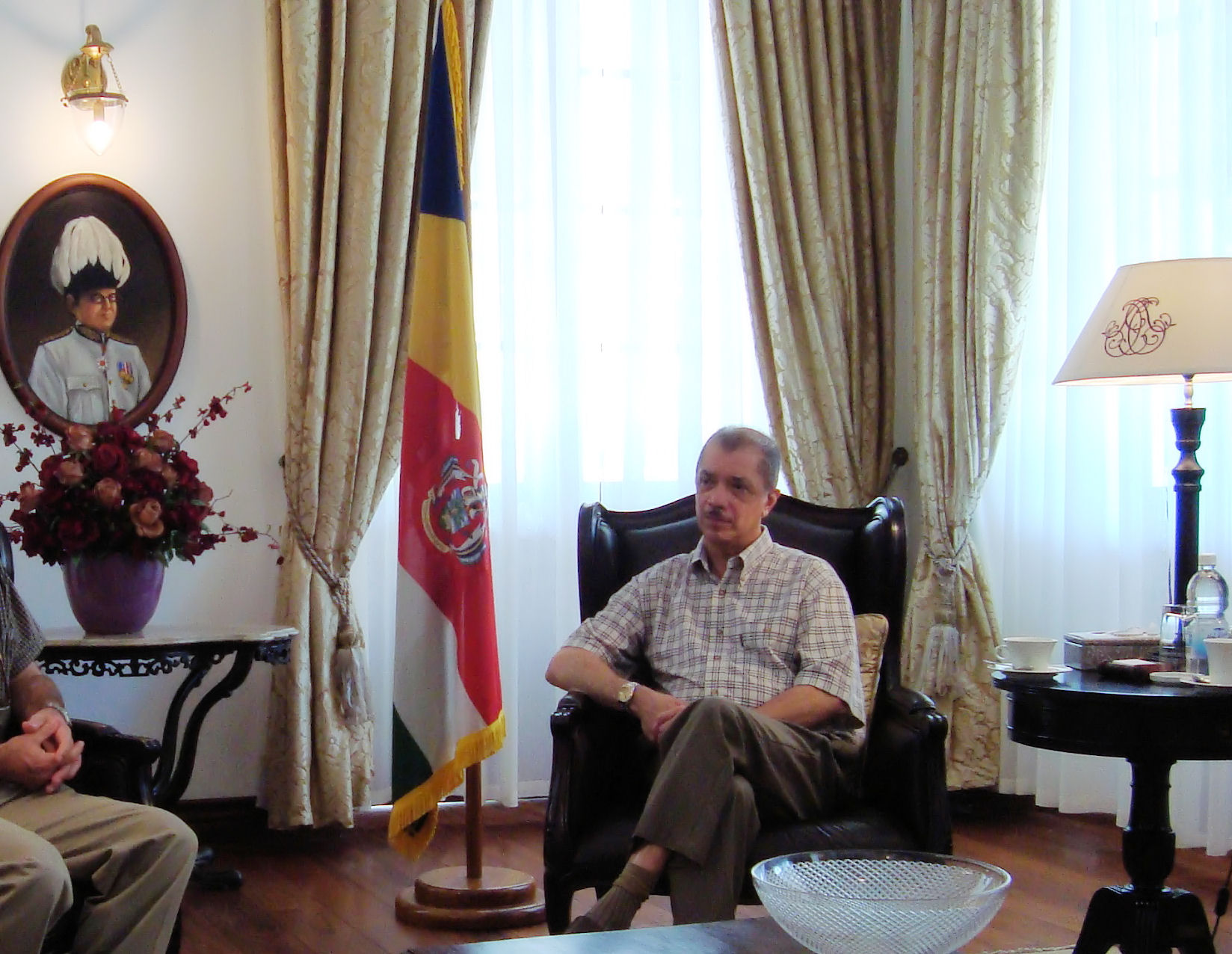
President James Michel in his office in Victoria, 2009

Seychelles' long-term president France-Albert René came to power after his supporters overthrew the first president James Mancham on 5 June 1977 in a coup d'état and installed him as president. René was at that time the prime minister. René ruled as a strongman under a socialist one-party system until 1993, when he was forced to introduce a multi-party system. He stepped down in 2004 in favour of his vice-president, James Michel, who was re-elected in 2006, 2011 and again in 2015. On 28 September 2016, the Office of the President announced that Michel would step down effective 16 October, and that Vice President Danny Faure would complete the rest of Michel's term.

On 26 October 2020, Wavel Ramkalawan, a 59-year-old Anglican priest, was elected the fifth President of the Republic of Seychelles. Ramkalawan was an opposition MP from 1993 to 2011, and from 2016 to 2020. He served as the Leader of the Opposition from 1998 to 2011 and from 2016 to 2020. Ramkalawan defeated incumbent Danny Faure by 54.9% to 43.5%. This marked the first time the opposition had won a presidential election in Seychelles.

The primary political parties are the former long-time ruling socialist People's Party (PP), known until 2009 as the Seychelles People's Progressive Front (SPPF) now called United Seychelles (US), and the socially liberal Seychelles National Party (SNP).

The election of the National Assembly was held on 22–24 October 2020. The Seychelles National Party, the Seychelles Party for Social Justice and Democracy and the Seychelles United Party formed a coalition, Linyon Demokratik Seselwa (LDS). LDS won 25 seats and US got 10 seats of the 35 seats of the National Assembly. However, in the 2025 Seychellois general election United Seychelles won 15 out of 26 seats in the parliament.

=== Foreign relations ===
Seychelles is a member of the United Nations, the African Union, the Indian Ocean Commission, La Francophonie, the Southern African Development Community and the Commonwealth of Nations.

Between 1979 and 1983, various plots to overthrow the non-aligned government of France-Albert René were, according to leading participants, supported by the United States, France, and South Africa. Commonly cited reasons for such attempts include René's socialist politics, his non-aligned stance toward the Western and Eastern Blocs, and the United States' military lease in the country, which was set to expire in 1990. All coup efforts in this period failed. Under the Obama administration, the US began running drone operations out of Seychelles. In the Spring of 2013, members of the Special-Purpose Marine Air-Ground Task Force Africa mentored troops in Seychelles, along with a variety of other African nations.

=== Military ===
The military of Seychelles is the Seychelles People's Defence Force which consists of a number of distinct branches: an infantry unit and coast guard, air force and a presidential protection unit. India has played and continues to play a key role in developing the military of Seychelles. After handing over two SDB Mk5 patrol vessels built by GRSE, the INS Tarasa and INS Tarmugli, to the Seychelles Coast Guard, which were subsequently renamed PS Constant and PS Topaz, India also gifted a Dornier 228 aircraft built by Hindustan Aeronautics Limited. India also signed a pact to develop Assumption Island. Spread over 11 km^{2} (4 sq mi), it is strategically located in the Indian Ocean, north of Madagascar. The island is being leased for the development of strategic assets by India. In 2018, Seychelles signed the UN Treaty on the Prohibition of Nuclear Weapons.

=== Incarceration ===
In 2014, Seychelles had the highest incarceration rate in the world of 799 prisoners per 100,000 population, exceeding the United States' rate by 15%. However, the country's actual population was less than 100,000; as of September 2014, Seychelles had 735 actual prisoners, 6% of whom were female and were incarcerated in three prisons. By 2022, the incarceration rate was 287 per 100,000 population, having dropped to the 31st highest in the world.

=== Modern piracy ===
Seychelles is a key participant in the fight against Indian Ocean piracy primarily committed by Somali pirates. Former president James Michel said that piracy costs between $7 million – $12 million a year to the international community: "The pirates cost 4% of the Seychelles GDP, including direct and indirect costs for the loss of boats, fishing, and tourism, and the indirect investment for the maritime security." These are factors affecting local fishing – one of the country's main national resources – which had a 46% loss in 2008–2009. International contributions of patrol boats, planes or drones have been provided to help Seychelles combat sea piracy.

=== Administrative divisions ===
Seychelles is divided into twenty-six administrative regions comprising all of the inner islands. Eight of the districts make up the capital of Seychelles and are referred to as Greater Victoria. Another 14 districts are considered the rural part of the main island of Mahé. Two more districts divide the island of Praslin and one covers La Digue as well as satellite and other Inner Islands. The rest of the Outer Islands (Îles Eloignées) make up the last district recently created by the tourism ministry.

Greater Victoria

- Bel Air
- La Rivière Anglaise (English River)
- Les Mamelles
- Mont Buxton
- Mont Fleuri
- Plaisance
- Roche Caiman
- Saint Louis

Rural Mahé

- Anse aux Pins
- Anse Boileau
- Anse Etoile
- Au Cap
- Anse Royale
- Baie Lazare
- Beau Vallon
- Bel Ombre
- Cascade
- Glacis
- Grand'Anse Mahé
- Pointe La Rue
- Port Glaud
- Takamaka

Praslin

- Baie Sainte Anne (Anse Volbert)
- Grand'Anse Praslin (Grande Anse)

La Digue and remaining Inner Islands

- La Digue (Anse Réunion)

== Geography ==
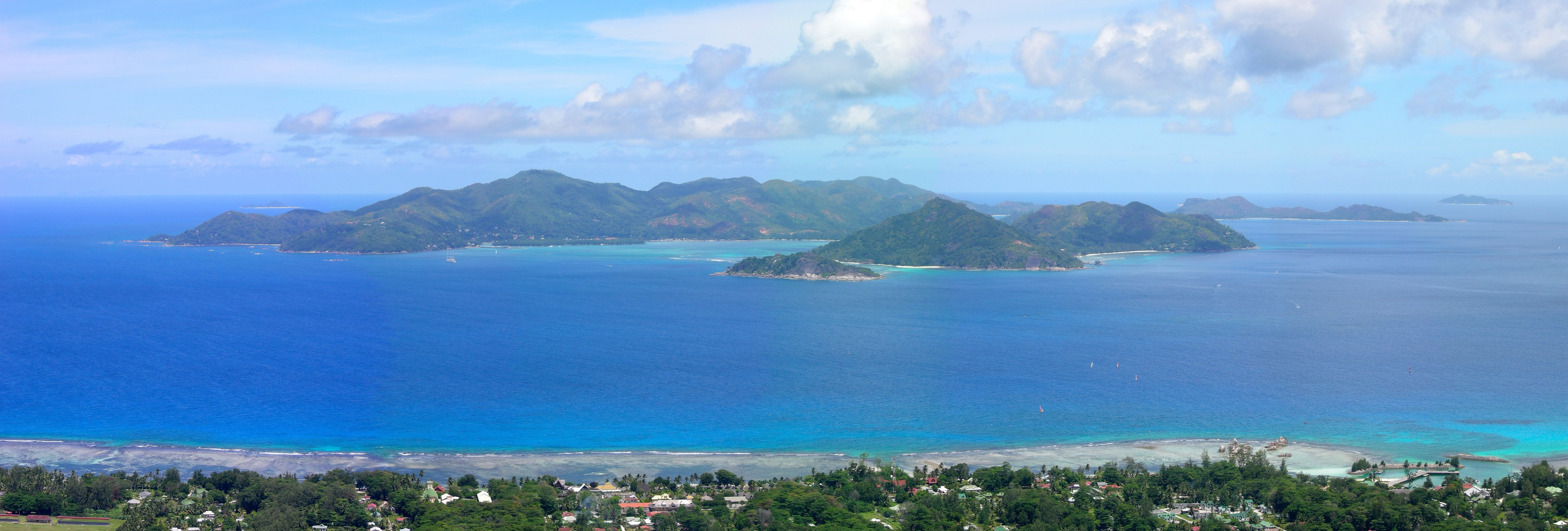
View of Praslin, the second largest island of Seychelles

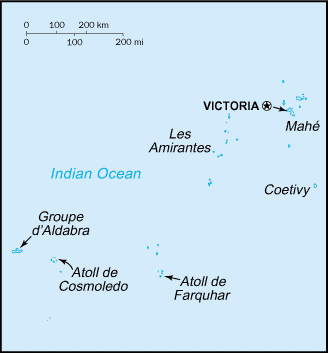
Map of Seychelles

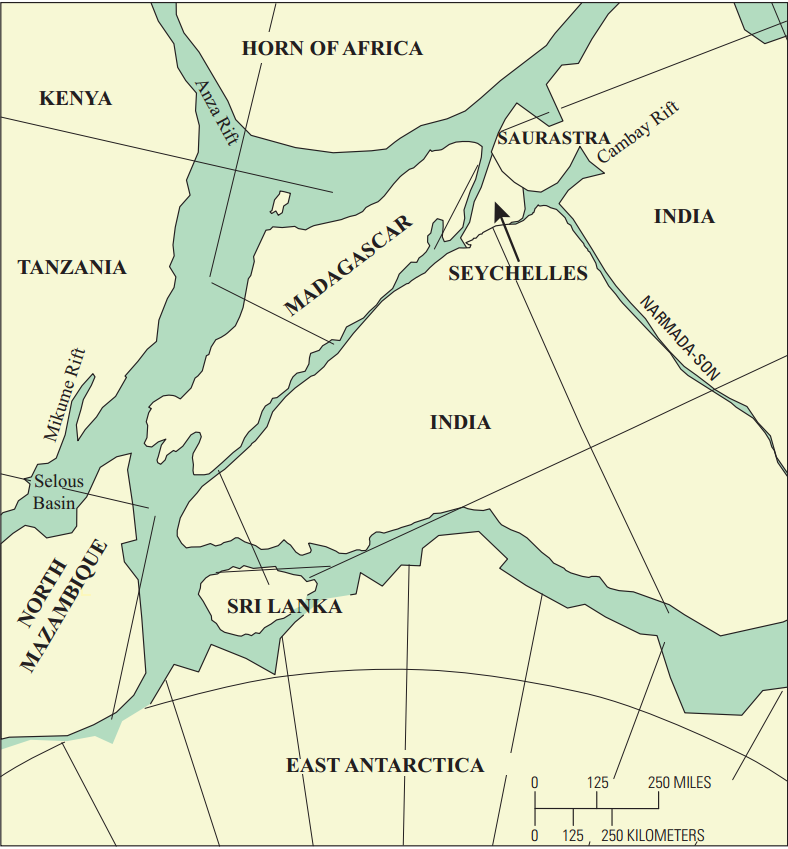
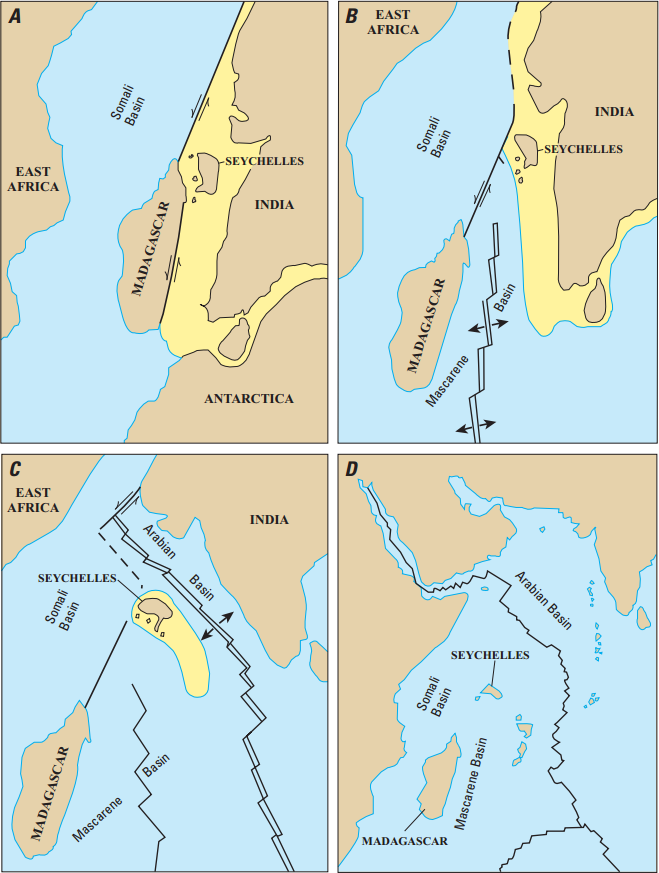
Early Jurassic breakup of Gondwana (left) and A- Early Cretaceous, B- Late Cretaceous, C-Paleocene, D- Present Day (right)

An island nation, Seychelles is located in the Somali Sea segment of the Indian Ocean, northeast of Madagascar and about 1,600 km (860 nmi) east of Kenya. The Constitution of Seychelles lists 155 named islands, and a further 7 reclaimed islands have been created subsequent to the publication of the Constitution. The majority of the islands are uninhabited, with many dedicated as nature reserves. Seychelles' largest island, Mahé, is located 1,550 km (835 nmi) from Mogadishu (Somalia's capital).

Seychelles sits atop a large submerged granite block known as the Seychelles microcontinent, which was sandwiched between Madagascar and India before the breakup of Gondwanaland. Alfred Wegener cited the Seychelles' granitic composition, akin to that of continents, as evidence of continental drift. After Madagascar separated from India during the Late Cretaceous, interaction with the Réunion hotspot caused the diverging oceanic rift to jump several times, breaking off a piece that is currently on the Somali plate and includes Seychelles, Mauritius, and Réunion, as well as another fragment on the present Indian plate that includes Lakshadweep, the Chagos Archipelago, and the Maldives.

A group of 44 islands (42 granitic and 2 coralline) occupy the shallow waters of the Seychelles Bank and are collectively referred to as the inner islands. They have a total area of 244 km^{2} (94 sq mi), accounting for 54% of the total land area of the Seychelles and 98% of the entire population.

The islands have been divided into groups. There are 42 granitic islands known as the Granitic Seychelles. These are in descending order of size: Mahé, Praslin, Silhouette, La Digue, Curieuse, Félicité, Frégate, Ste. Anne, North, Cerf, Marianne, Grande Sœur, Thérèse, Aride, Conception, Petite Sœur, Cousin, Cousine, Long, Récif, Round (Praslin), Anonyme, Mamelles, Moyenne, Ile aux Vaches Marines, L'Islette, Beacon (Ile Sèche), Cachée, Cocos, Round (Mahé), l'Ilot Frégate, Booby, Chauve Souris (Mahé), Chauve Souris (Praslin), Ile La Fouche, Hodoul, L'Ilot, Rat, Souris, St. Pierre (Praslin), Zavé, Harrison Rocks (Grand Rocher).

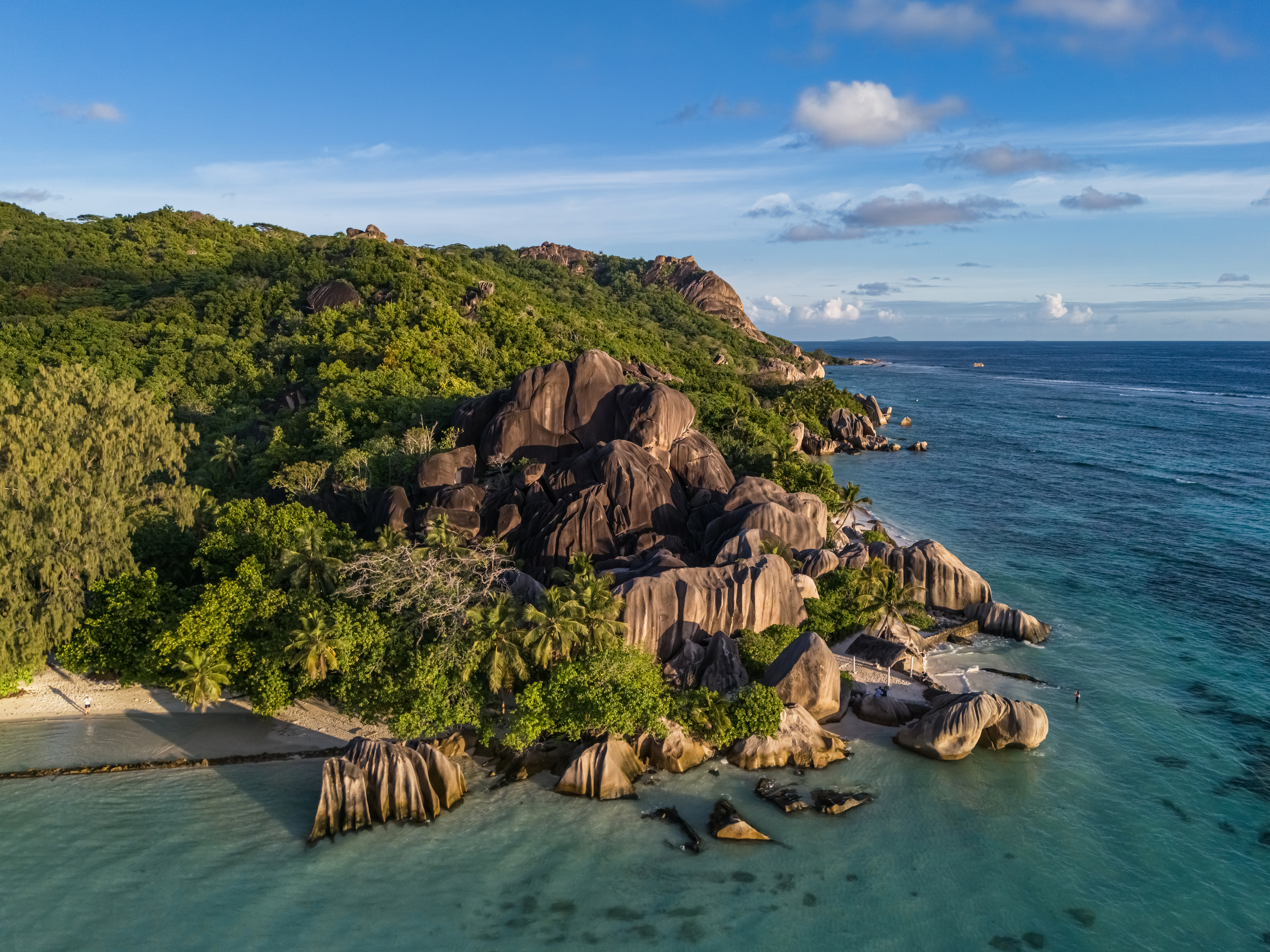
Beach of Anse Source d'Argent on the island of La Digue

There are two coral sand cays north of the granitics on the edge of the Seychelles Bank: Denis and Bird. There are two coral islands south of the Granitic: Coëtivy and Platte.

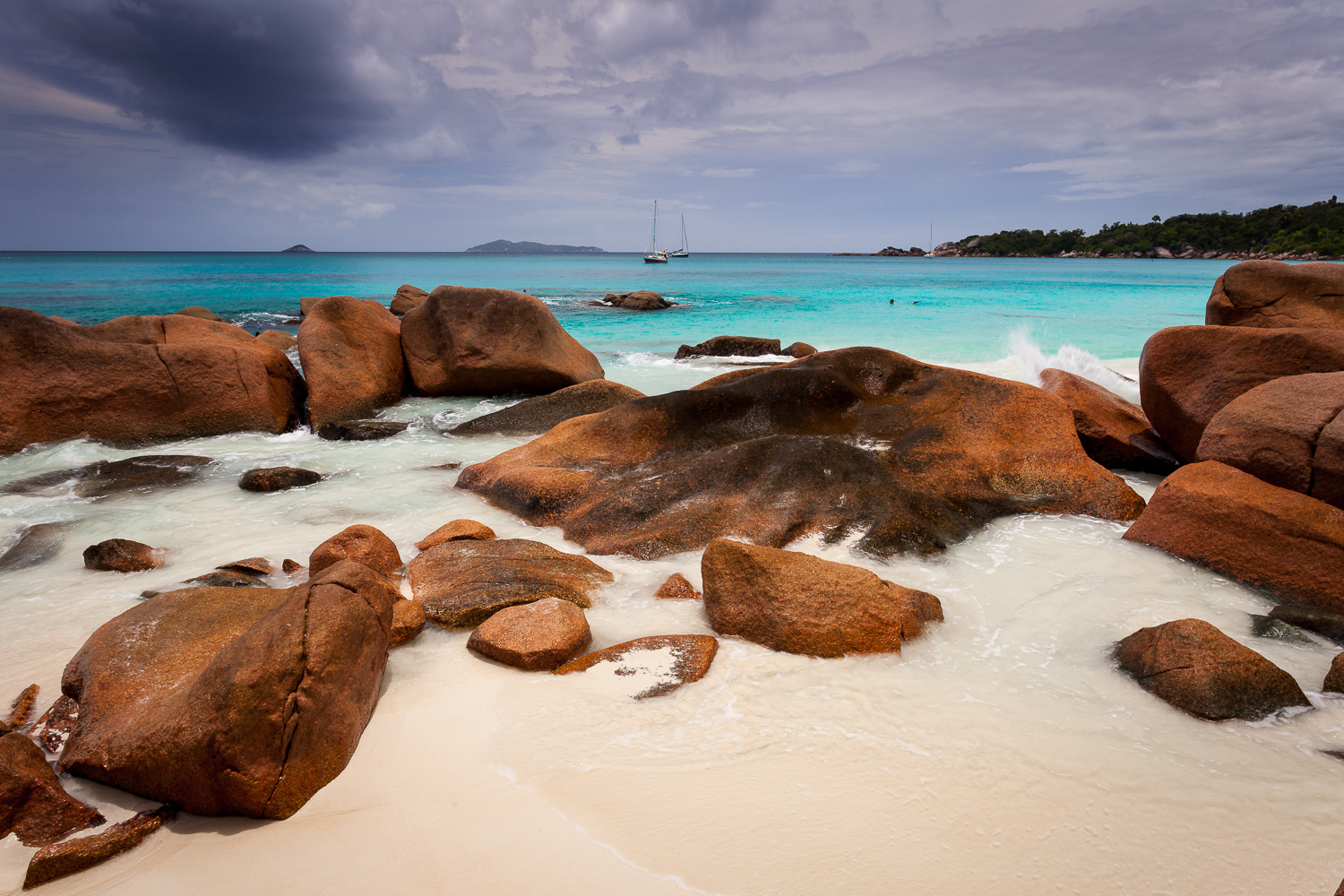
Beach of Anse Lazio on the island of Praslin

There are 29 coral islands in the Amirantes group, west of the granitic: Desroches, Poivre Atoll (comprising three islands—Poivre, Florentin and South Island), Alphonse, D'Arros, St. Joseph Atoll (comprising 14 islands—St. Joseph, Île aux Fouquets, Resource, Petit Carcassaye, Grand Carcassaye, Benjamin, Bancs Ferrari, Chiens, Pélicans, Vars, Île Paul, Banc de Sable, Banc aux Cocos and Île aux Poules), Marie Louise, Desnœufs, African Banks (comprising two islands—African Banks and South Island), Rémire, St. François, Boudeuse, Étoile, Bijoutier.

There are 13 coral islands in the Farquhar Group, south-southwest of the Amirantes: Farquhar Atoll (comprising 10 islands—Bancs de Sable, Déposés, Île aux Goëlettes, Lapins, Île du Milieu, North Manaha, South Manaha, Middle Manaha, North Island and South Island), Providence Atoll (comprising two islands—Providence and Bancs Providence) and St Pierre.

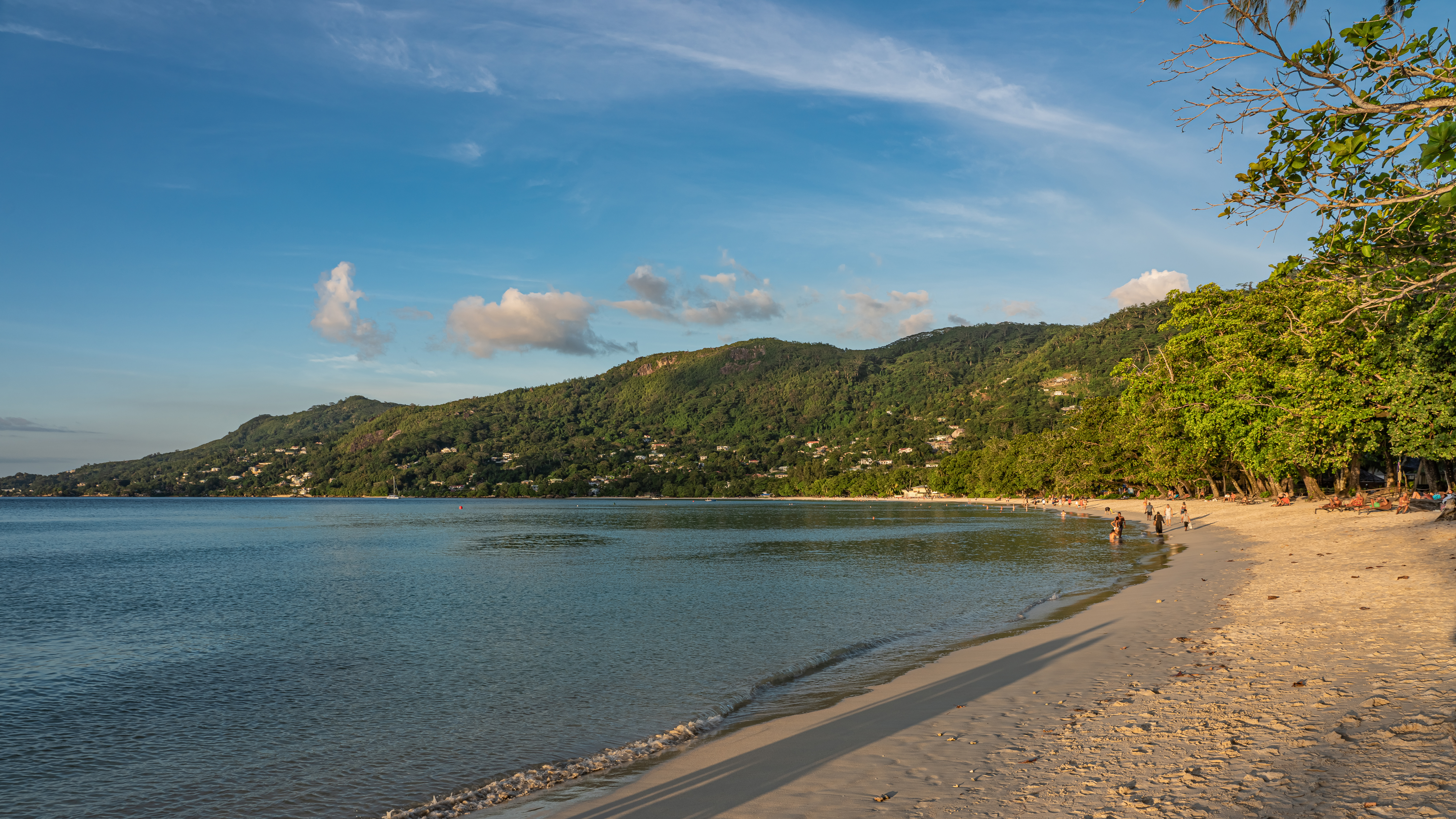
Beach on Mahé Island

There are 67 raised coral islands in the Aldabra Group, west of the Farquhar Group: Aldabra Atoll (comprising 46 islands—Grande Terre, Picard, Polymnie, Malabar, Île Michel, Île Esprit, Île aux Moustiques, Ilot Parc, Ilot Émile, Ilot Yangue, Ilot Magnan, Île Lanier, Champignon des Os, Euphrate, Grand Mentor, Grand Ilot, Gros Ilot Gionnet, Gros Ilot Sésame, Héron Rock, Hide Island, Île aux Aigrettes, Île aux Cèdres, Îles Chalands, Île Fangame, Île Héron, Île Michel, Île Squacco, Île Sylvestre, Île Verte, Ilot Déder, Ilot du Sud, Ilot du Milieu, Ilot du Nord, Ilot Dubois, Ilot Macoa, Ilot Marquoix, Ilots Niçois, Ilot Salade, Middle Row Island, Noddy Rock, North Row Island, Petit Mentor, Petit Mentor Endans, Petits Ilots, Pink Rock and Table Ronde), Assumption Island, Astove and Cosmoledo Atoll (comprising 19 islands—Menai, Île du Nord (West North), Île Nord-Est (East North), Île du Trou, Goélettes, Grand Polyte, Petit Polyte, Grand Île (Wizard), Pagode, Île du Sud-Ouest (South), Île aux Moustiques, Île Baleine, Île aux Chauve-Souris, Île aux Macaques, Île aux Rats, Île du Nord-Ouest, Île Observation, Île Sud-Est and Ilot la Croix).

In addition to these 155 islands, as per the Constitution of Seychelles, there are 7 reclaimed islands: Ile Perseverance, Ile Aurore, Romainville, Eden Island, Eve, Ile du Port and Ile Soleil.

South Island, African Banks has been eroded by the sea. At St Joseph Atoll, Banc de Sable and Pelican Island have also eroded, while Grand Carcassaye and Petit Carcassaye have merged to form one island. There are also several unnamed islands at Aldabra, St Joseph Atoll and Cosmoledo. Pti Astove, though named, failed to make it into the Constitution for unknown reasons. Bancs Providence is not a single island, but a dynamic group of islands, comprising four large and about six very small islets in 2016.

=== Climate ===
The climate is very humid, as the islands are small, and is classified by the Köppen-Geiger system as a tropical rain forest (Af). The temperature varies little throughout the year. Temperatures on Mahé vary from 24 to 30 °C (75 to 86 °F), and rainfall ranges from 2,900 mm (114 in) annually at Victoria to 3,600 mm (142 in) on the mountain slopes. Precipitation levels are somewhat less on the other islands.

During the coolest months, July and August, the average low is about 24 °C (75 °F). The southeast trade winds blow regularly from May to November, and this is the most pleasant time of the year. The hot months are from December to April, with higher humidity (80%). March and April are the hottest months, but the temperature seldom exceeds 31 °C (88 °F). Most of the islands lie outside the cyclone belt, so high winds are rare.

Climate data for Victoria (Seychelles International Airport)
Month	Jan	Feb	Mar	Apr	May	Jun	Jul	Aug	Sep	Oct	Nov	Dec	Year
Mean daily maximum °C (°F)	29.8 (85.6)	30.4 (86.7)	31.0 (87.8)	31.4 (88.5)	30.5 (86.9)	29.1 (84.4)	28.3 (82.9)	28.4 (83.1)	29.1 (84.4)	29.6 (85.3)	30.1 (86.2)	30.0 (86.0)	29.8 (85.6)
Daily mean °C (°F)	26.8 (80.2)	27.3 (81.1)	27.8 (82.0)	28.0 (82.4)	27.7 (81.9)	26.6 (79.9)	25.8 (78.4)	25.9 (78.6)	26.4 (79.5)	26.7 (80.1)	26.8 (80.2)	26.7 (80.1)	26.9 (80.4)
Mean daily minimum °C (°F)	24.1 (75.4)	24.6 (76.3)	24.8 (76.6)	25.0 (77.0)	25.4 (77.7)	24.6 (76.3)	23.9 (75.0)	23.9 (75.0)	24.2 (75.6)	24.3 (75.7)	24.0 (75.2)	23.9 (75.0)	24.4 (75.9)
Average precipitation mm (inches)	379 (14.9)	262 (10.3)	167 (6.6)	177 (7.0)	124 (4.9)	63 (2.5)	80 (3.1)	97 (3.8)	121 (4.8)	206 (8.1)	215 (8.5)	281 (11.1)	2,172 (85.6)
Average precipitation days (≥ 1.0 mm)	17	11	11	14	11	10	10	10	11	12	14	18	149
Average relative humidity (%)	82	80	79	80	79	79	80	79	78	79	80	82	79.8
Mean monthly sunshine hours	153.3	175.5	210.5	227.8	252.8	232.0	230.5	230.7	227.7	220.7	195.7	170.5	2,527.7
Source 1: World Meteorological Organization
Source 2: National Oceanic and Atmospheric Administration

=== Wildlife ===
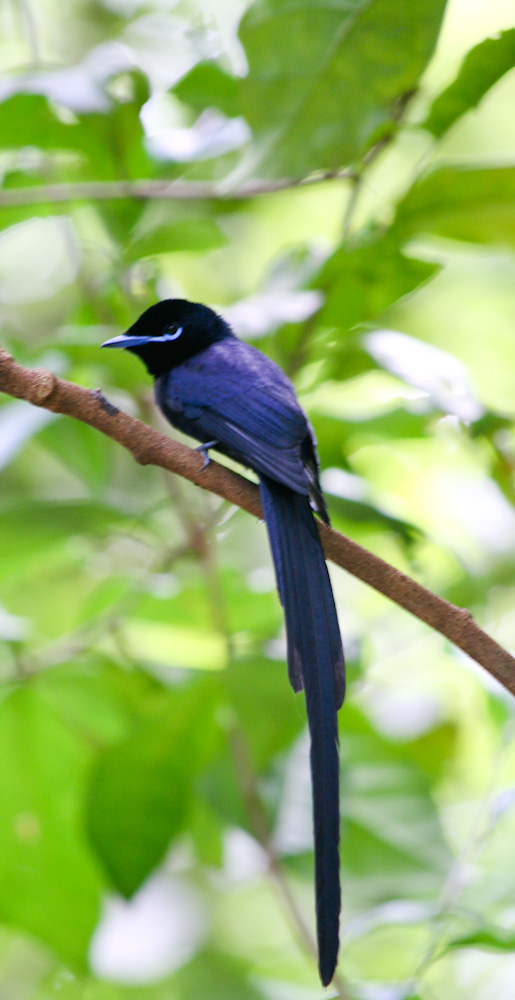
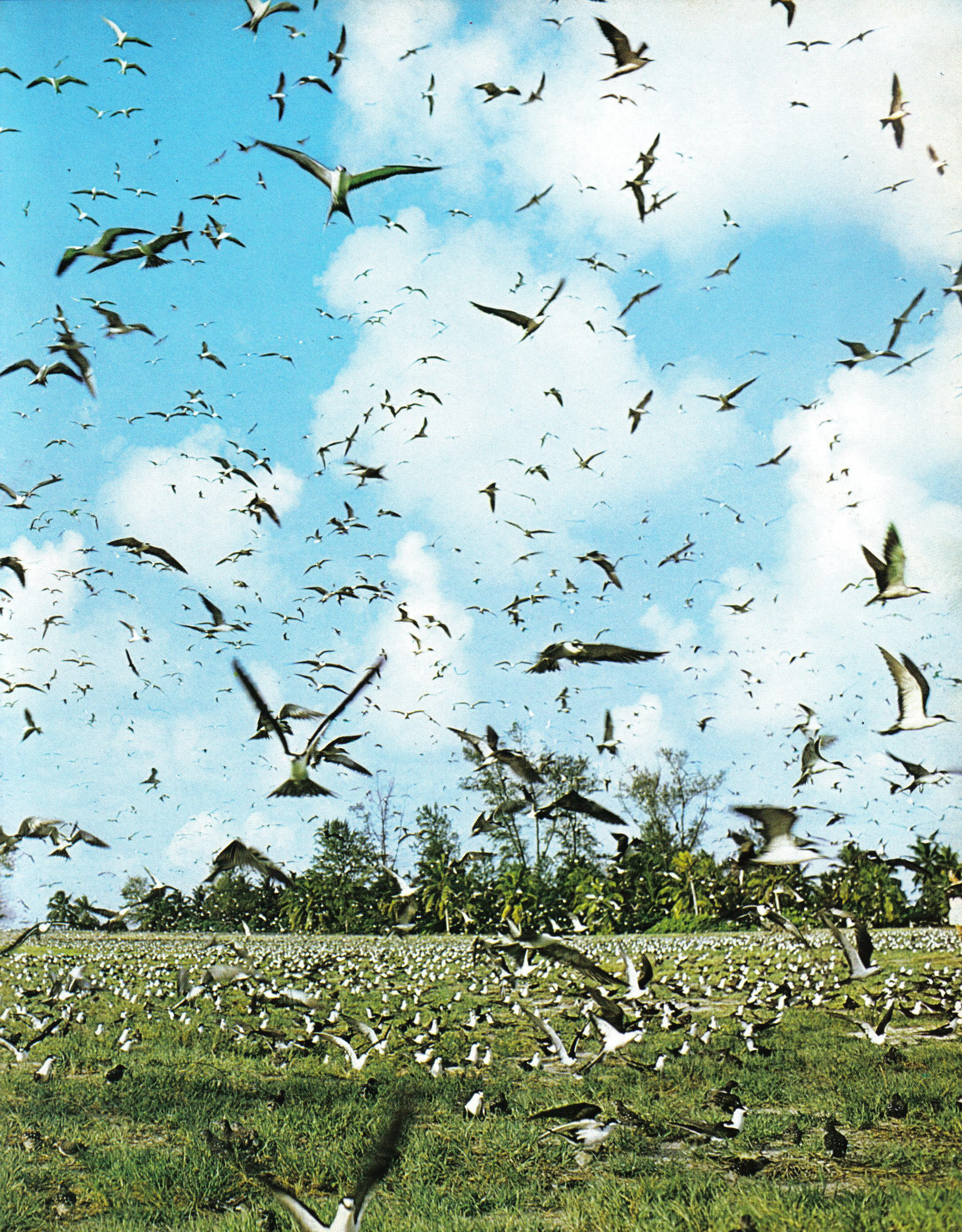
Left: Seychelles paradise flycatcher; right: bird flocks on Bird Island, Seychelles

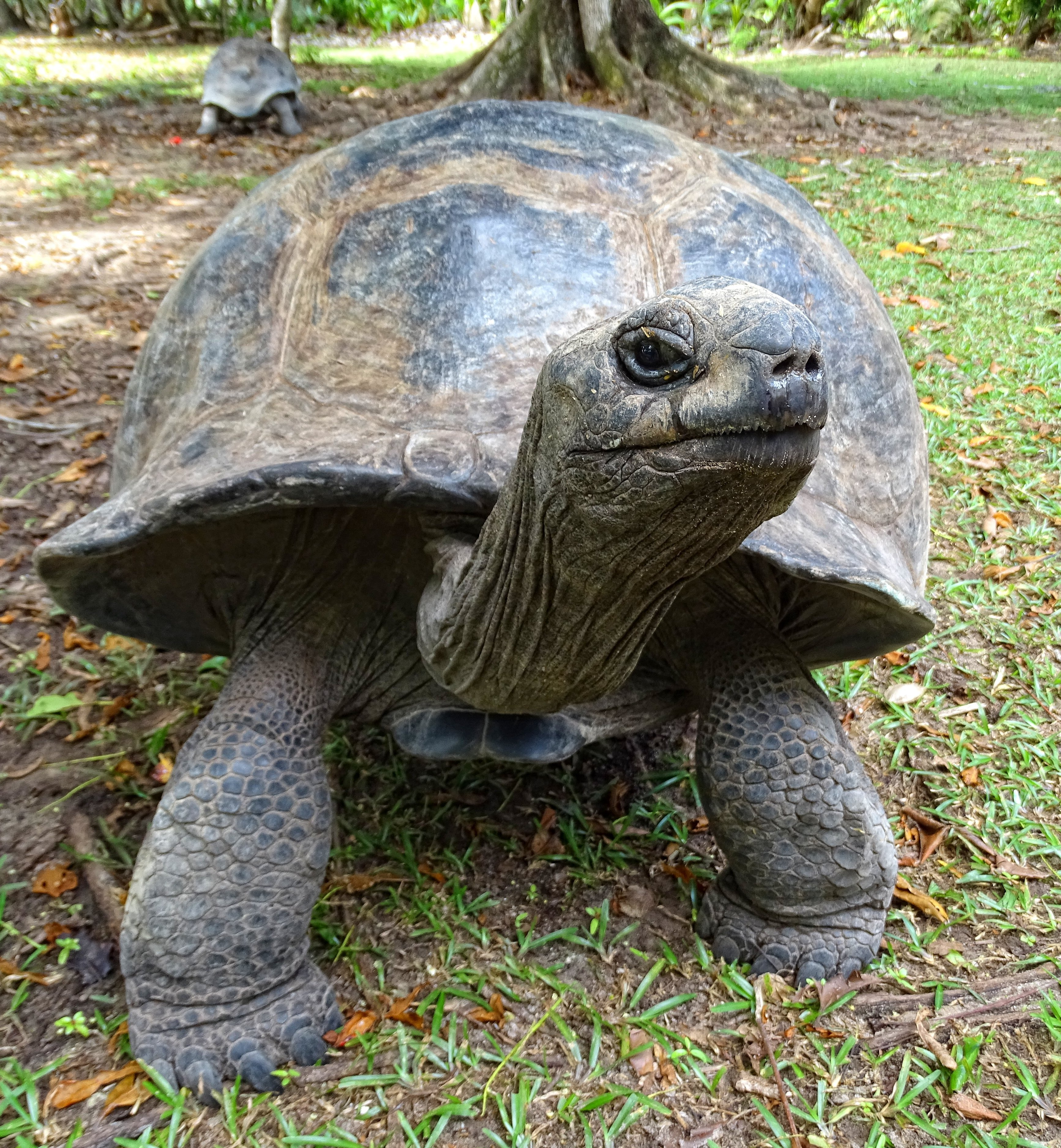
An Aldabra giant tortoise

Seychelles is among the world's leading countries to protect lands for threatened species, allocating 42% of its territory for conservation. Like many fragile island ecosystems, Seychelles saw the loss of biodiversity when humans first settled in the area, including the disappearance of most of the giant tortoises from the granitic islands, the felling of coastal and mid-level forests, and the extinction of species such as the chestnut flanked white eye, the Seychelles parakeet, and the saltwater crocodile. However, extinctions were far fewer than on islands such as Mauritius or Hawaii, partly due to a shorter period of human occupation. Seychelles is known for success stories in protecting its flora and fauna. The rare Seychelles black parrot, the national bird of the country, is now protected.

The freshwater crab genus Seychellum is endemic to the granitic Seychelles, and a further 26 species of crabs and five species of hermit crabs live on the islands. From the year 1500 until the mid-1800s (approximately), the then-previously unknown Aldabra giant tortoise was killed for food by pirates and sailors, driving their numbers to near-extinction levels. Recently, a healthy yet fragile population of 150,000 tortoises live solely on the atoll of Aldabra, declared a UNESCO World Heritage Site. Additionally, these ancient reptiles can further be found in numerous zoos, botanical gardens, and private collections internationally. Their protection from poaching and smuggling is overseen by CITES, whilst captive breeding has greatly reduced the negative impact on the remaining wild populations. The granitic islands of Seychelles supports three extant species of Seychelles giant tortoise.

Seychelles hosts some of the largest seabird colonies in the world, notably on the outer islands of Aldabra and Cosmoledo. In granitic Seychelles the largest colonies are on Aride Island including the world's largest numbers of two species. The sooty tern also breeds on the islands. Other common birds include cattle egret (Bubulcus ibis) and the fairy tern (Gygis alba). More than 1,000 species of fish have been recorded.

The granitic islands of Seychelles are home to roughly 268 flowering plant species, of which 70 (28%) are endemic. Particularly well known is the coco de mer, a species of palm that grows only on the islands of Praslin and neighbouring Curieuse. Sometimes nicknamed the "love nut" (the shape of its "double" coconut resembles buttocks), the coco-de-mer produces the world's heaviest seed. The jellyfish tree is to be found in only a few locations on Mahé. This strange and ancient plant, in a genus of its own, Medusagyne seems to reproduce only in cultivation and not in the wild. Other unique plant species include Wright's gardenia (Rothmannia annae), found only on Aride Island's Special Reserve. There are 6 potentially endemic species of orchid living on the islands.

Seychelles is home to two terrestrial ecoregions: Granitic Seychelles forests and Aldabra Island xeric scrub. The country had a 2019 Forest Landscape Integrity Index mean score of 10/10, ranking it first globally out of 172 countries.

=== Environmental issues ===
Since the use of spearguns and dynamite for fishing was banned through efforts of local conservationists in the 1960s, the wildlife is unafraid of snorkelers and divers. Coral bleaching in 1998 has damaged most reefs, but some reefs show healthy recovery (such as Silhouette Island).

Seychelles claims to have achieved nearly all of its Millennium Development Goals, with 7 out of 8 goals having been achieved. Environmental protection has been emphasized by the government.

The government's Seychelles Climate Guide describes the nation's climate as rainy, with a dry season with an ocean economy in the ocean regions. The Southeast Trades is on the decline but still fairly strong. Reportedly, weather patterns there are becoming less predictable.

== Demographics ==
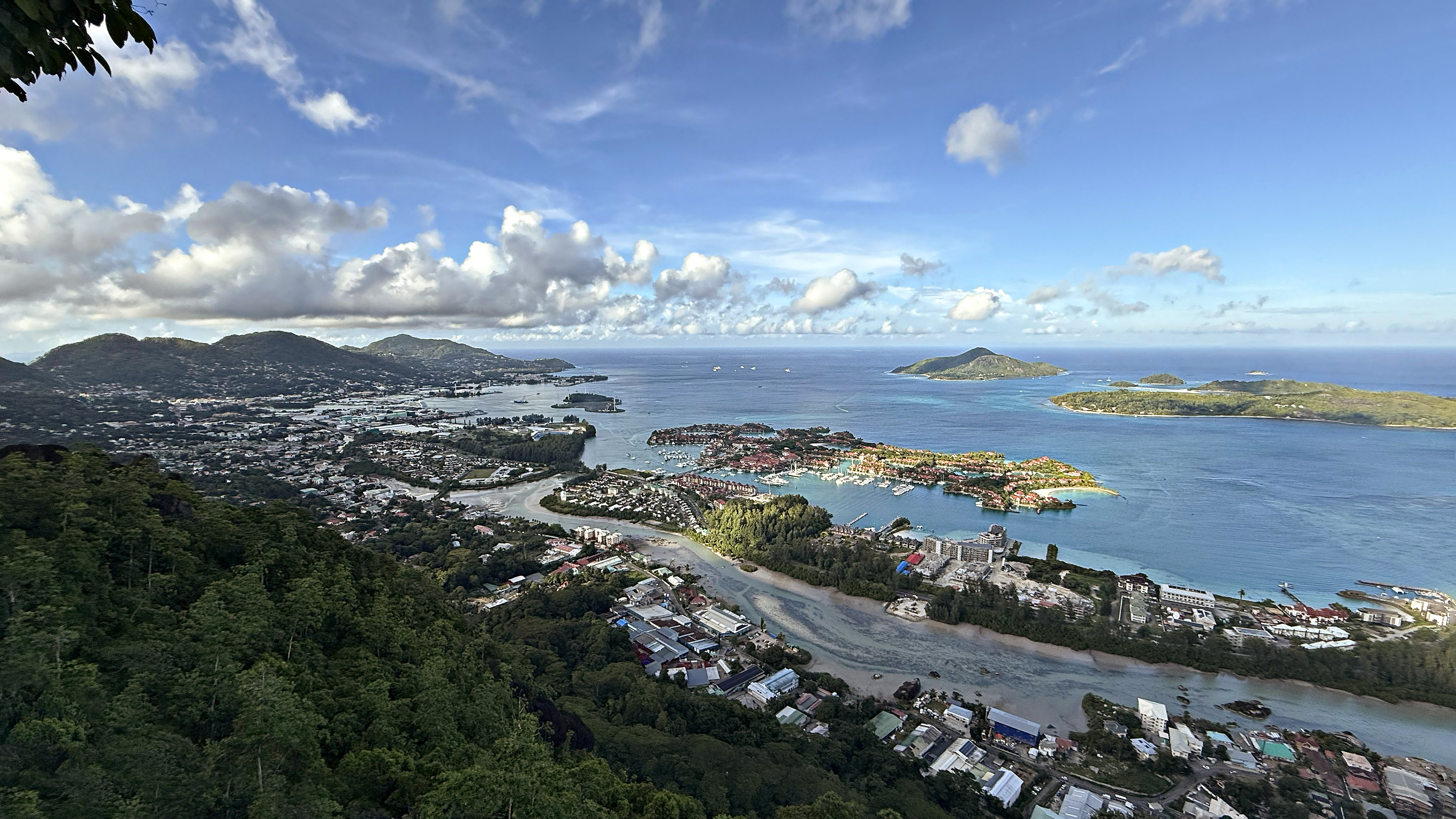
Victoria, capital and largest city of Seychelles

When the British gained control of the islands during the Napoleonic Wars, they allowed the French upper class to retain their land. Both the French and British settlers used enslaved Africans, and although the British prohibited slavery in 1835, African workers continued to come. The Gran blan ("big whites") of French origin dominated economic and political life. The British administration employed Indians on indentured servitude to the same degree as in Mauritius resulting in a small Indian population. The Indians, like a similar minority of Chinese, were generally in the merchant class.

Today, Seychelles is described as a fusion of peoples and cultures. Numerous Seychellois are considered multiracial: blending from African, Asian and European descent to create a modern creole culture. Evidence of this blend is also revealed in Seychellois food, incorporating various aspects of French, Chinese, Indian and African cuisine.

As the islands of Seychelles had no indigenous population, the current Seychellois descend from people who immigrated, of which the largest ethnic groups were those of African, French, Indian and Chinese origin. The median age of the Seychellois is 34 years.

=== Languages ===
French and English are official languages along with Seychellois Creole, which is a French-based creole language related to those spoken in Mauritius and Réunion. Seychellois Creole is the most widely spoken native language and de facto the national language of the country. Seychellois Creole is often spoken with English words and phrases mixed in. About 91% of the population are native speakers of Seychellois Creole, 5.1% of English and 0.7% of French. Most business and official meetings are conducted in English and nearly all official websites are in English. National Assembly business is conducted in Creole, but laws are passed and published in English.

Tamil is also a prominent language in Seychelles, spoken primarily by the Indo-Seychellois community, who form a significant part of the country's multilingual society.

=== Religion ===
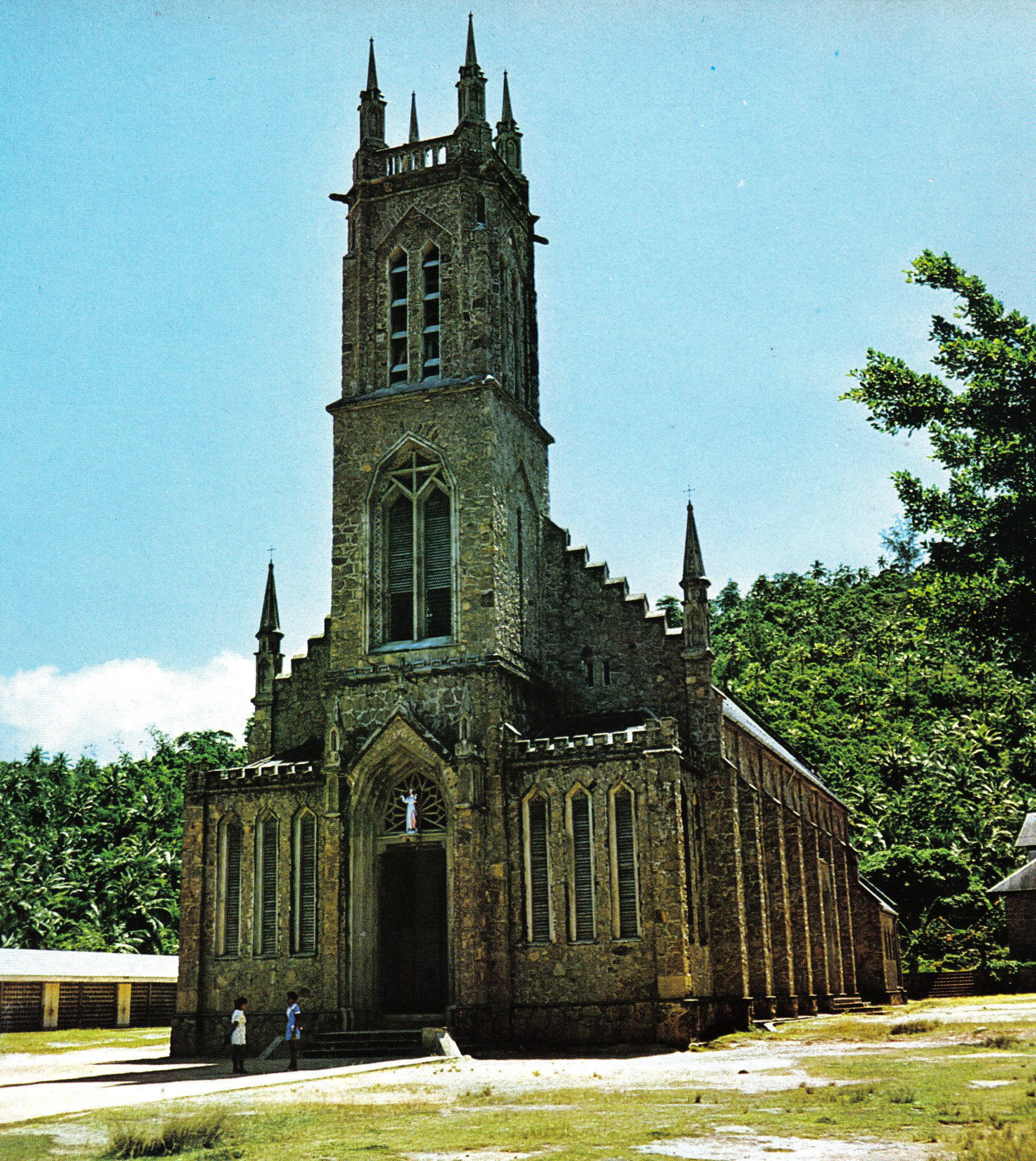
St. Francis of Assisi Church, Baie Lazare, Mahé island

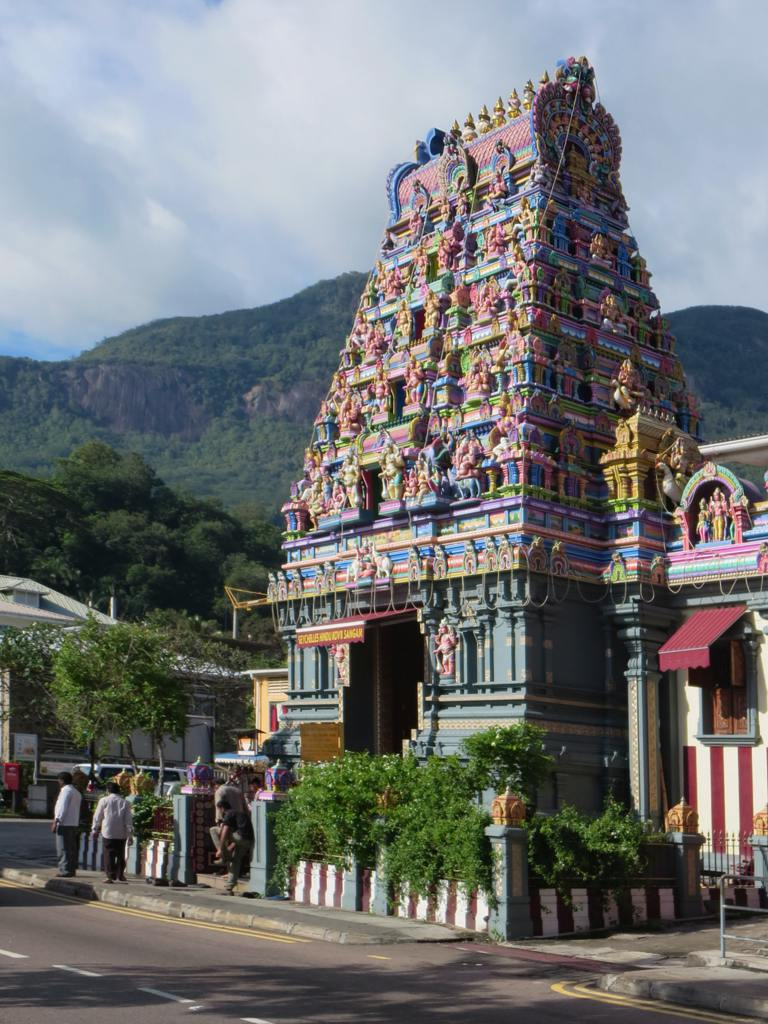
Arulmigu Navashakti Vinayakar Temple in Victoria

According to the 2022 census, most Seychellois are Christians: 61.3% were Catholic, pastorally served by the exempt Diocese of Port Victoria; 5.0% were Anglican and 8.6% follows other denominations of Christianity.

Hinduism is the second largest religion, adhered to by more than 5.4% of the population. Hinduism is followed mainly by the Indo-Seychellois community.

Islam is followed by another 1.6% of the population. Other faiths accounted for 1.1% of the population, while a further 5.9% were non-religious or did not specify a religion.

== Economy ==
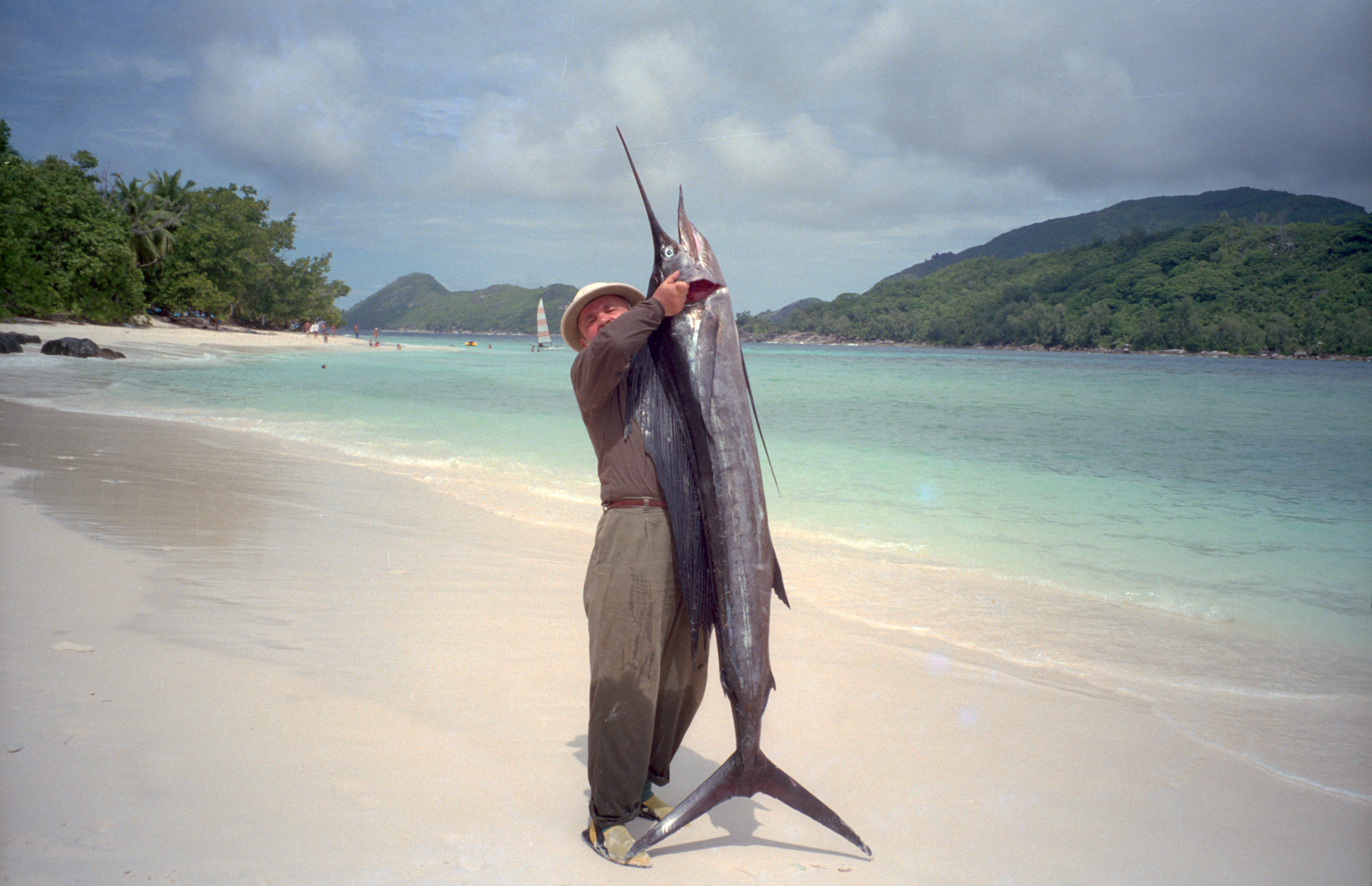
The sailfish at Mahé Beach

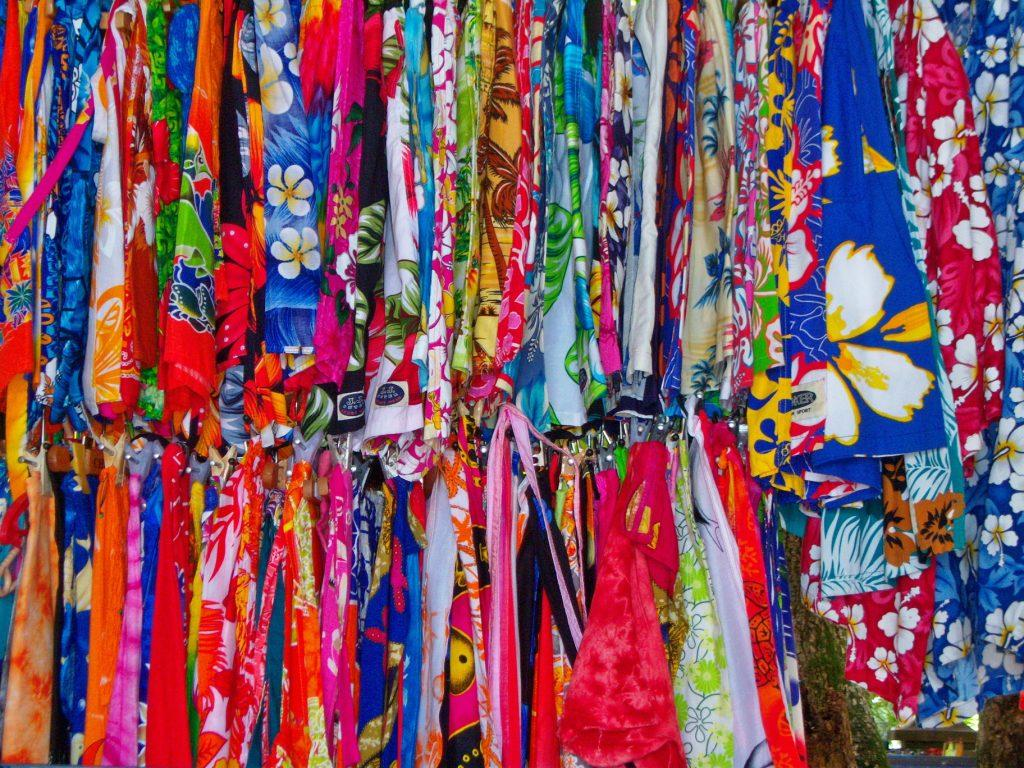
Colourful skirts at a Seychelles market

During the plantation era, cinnamon, vanilla and copra were the chief exports. In 1965, during a three-month visit to the islands, futurist Donald Prell prepared for the crown colony's Governor General an economic report containing a scenario for the future of the economy. Quoting from his report, in the 1960s, about 33% of the working population worked at plantations, and 20% worked in the public or government sector. The Indian Ocean Tracking Station on Mahé used by the United States' Air Force Satellite Control Network was closed in August 1996 after the Seychelles government attempted to raise the rent to more than $10,000,000 per year.

Since independence in 1976, per capita output has expanded to roughly seven times the old near-subsistence level. Growth has been led by the tourist sector, which employs about 30% of the labour force, compared to agriculture which today employs about 3% of the labour force. Despite the growth of tourism, farming and fishing continue to employ some people, as do industries that process coconuts and vanilla.

As of 2013, the main export products are processed fish (60%) and non-fillet frozen fish (22%).

The prime agricultural products currently produced in Seychelles include sweet potatoes, vanilla, coconuts and cinnamon. These products provide much of the economic support of the locals. Frozen and canned fish, copra, cinnamon and vanilla are the main export commodities.

The Seychelles government has prioritised a curbing of the budget deficit, including the containment of social welfare costs and further privatisation of public enterprises. The government has a pervasive presence in economic activity, with public enterprises active in petroleum product distribution, banking, imports of basic products, telecommunications and a wide range of other businesses. According to the 2013 Index of Economic Freedom, which measures the degree of limited government, market openness, regulatory efficiency, rule of law, and other factors, economic freedom has been increasing each year since 2010.

The national currency of Seychelles is the Seychellois rupee. Initially tied to a basket of international currencies, it was unpegged and allowed to be devalued and float freely in 2008 on the presumed hopes of attracting further foreign investment in the Seychelles economy.

Seychelles has emerged as the least corrupt country in Africa in the latest Corruption Perception Index report released by Transparency International in January 2020.

=== Tourism ===
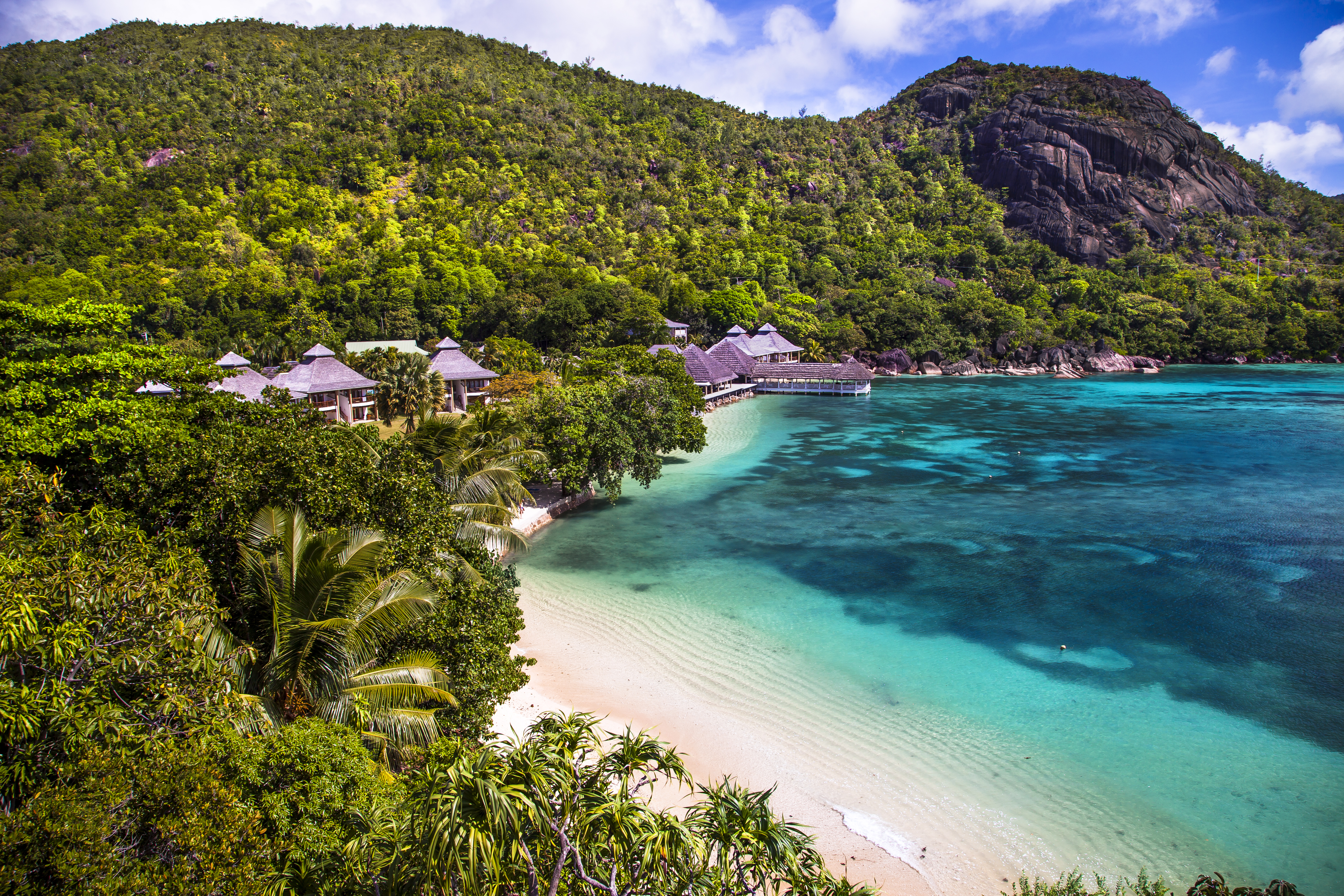
Beach resort at Seychelles

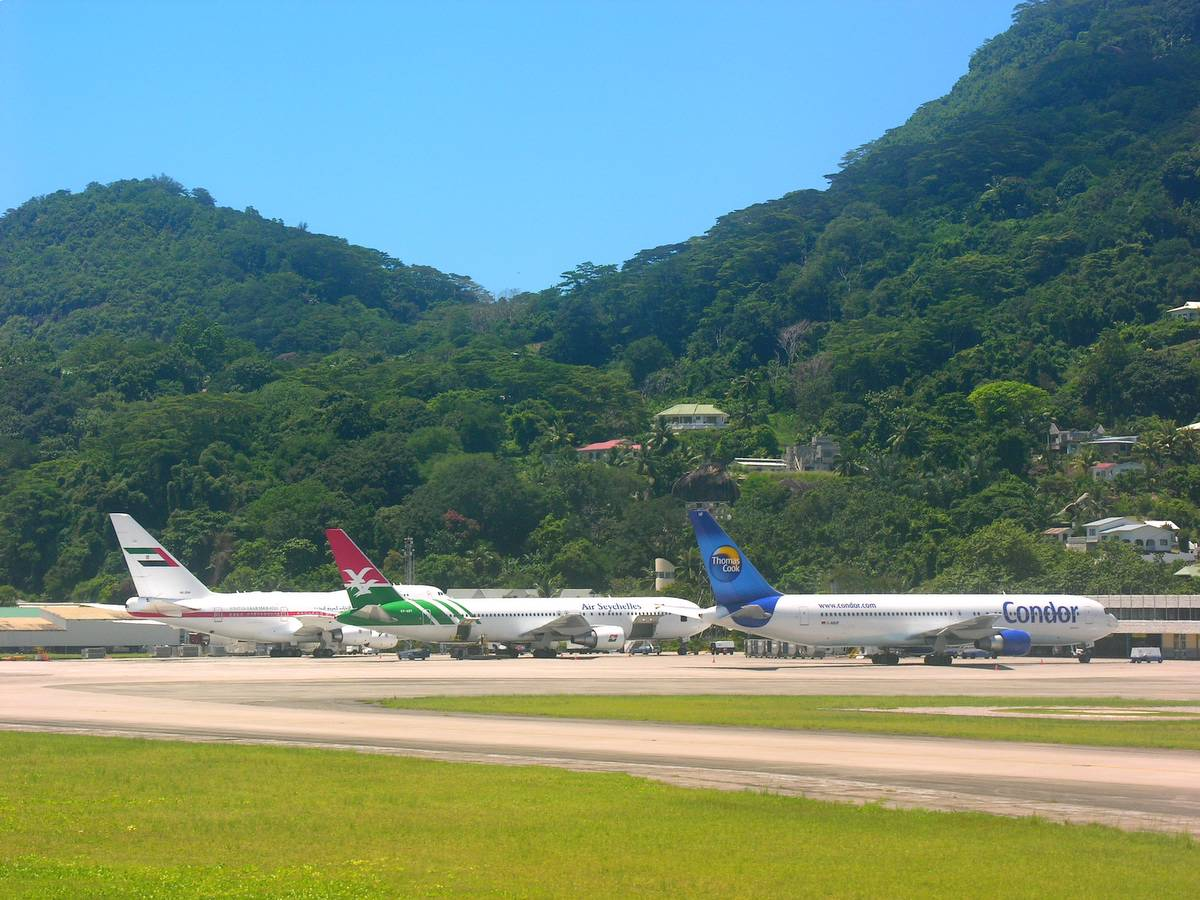
Aircraft at Seychelles International Airport

In 1971, with the opening of Seychelles International Airport, tourism became a significant industry, essentially dividing the economy into plantations and tourism. The tourism sector paid better, and the plantation economy could expand only so far. The plantation sector of the economy declined in prominence, and tourism became the primary industry of Seychelles. Consequently, there was a sustained spate of hotel construction throughout almost the entire 1970s which included the opening of Coral Strand Smart Choice, Vista Do Mar and Bougainville Hotel in 1972.

In recent years the government has encouraged foreign direct investment to upgrade its hospitality infrastructure and service sectors. These policy frameworks, championed by the Seychelles Investment Board, have catalyzed significant capital inflows into luxury real estate and integrated resort developments. Central to this growth was the World Bank's Sustainability and Climate Resilience Development Policy Loan—which succeeded earlier structural adjustment programs to strengthen the business environment and fiscal management.

Since then the government has moved to reduce the dependence on tourism by promoting the development of farming, fishing, small-scale manufacturing and most recently the offshore financial sector, through the establishment of the Financial Services Authority and the enactment of several pieces of legislation (such as the International Corporate Service Providers Act, the International Business Companies Act, the Securities Act, the Mutual Funds and Hedge Fund Act, amongst others). In March 2015, Seychelles allocated Assumption Island to be developed by India.

Owing to the effects of COVID-19, Seychelles shut down its borders to international tourism in the year 2020. As the national vaccination programme progressed well, the nation's Ministry of Foreign Affairs and Tourism decided to reopen the borders to international tourists on 25 March 2021.

=== Energy ===
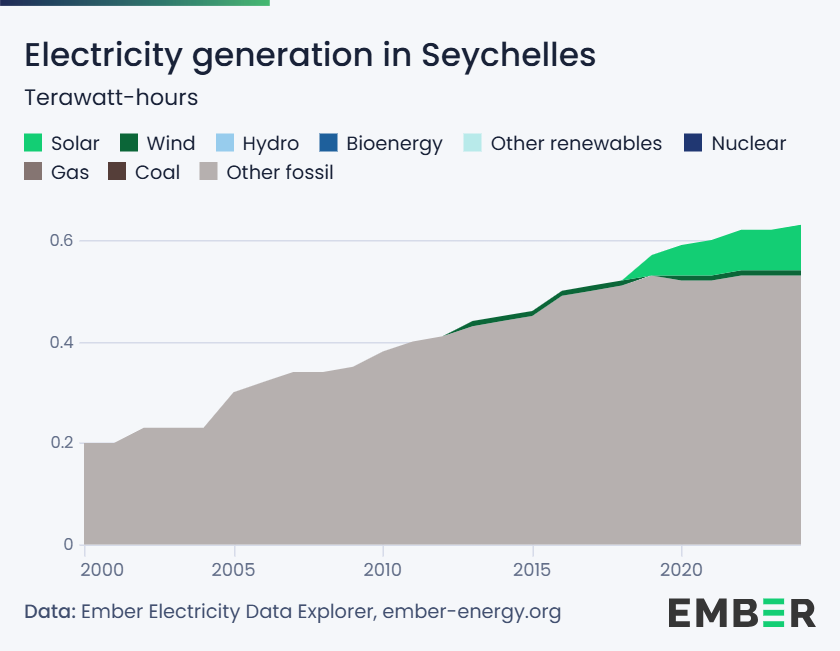
Electricity generation in Seychelles in terawatt-hours

Although multinational oil companies have explored the waters around the islands, no oil or gas has been found. In 2005, a deal was signed with US firm Petroquest, giving it exploration rights to about 30,000 km^{2} (12,000 sq mi) around Constant, Topaz, Farquhar and Coëtivy islands until 2014. Seychelles imports oil from the Persian Gulf in the form of refined petroleum derivatives at the rate of about 5,700 barrels per day (910 m^{3}/d).

In recent years oil has been imported from the United Arab Emirates and Oman. In 2023, the UAE accounted for $298M (roughly 83%) of all refined petroleum imports to the Seychelles. Seychelles imports three times more oil than is needed for internal uses: this surplus is strategically re-exported as bunker fuel for international shipping and aviation at Port Victoria. There are no refining capacities on the islands. Oil and gas imports, distribution and re-export are the responsibility of Seychelles Petroleum (SEYPEC), while oil exploration is the responsibility of PetroSeychelles, formerly the Seychelles National Oil Company (SNOC).

== Culture ==
=== Art ===
The National Art Gallery was inaugurated in 1994 on the occasion of the official opening of the National Cultural Centre on 18 June 1994, which houses the National Library and National Archives along with other offices of the Ministry of Culture. At its inauguration, the Minister of Culture decreed that the exhibition of works of Seychellois artists, painters and sculptors was "a testimony to the development of art in Seychelles as a creative form of expression", providing a view of the state of the country's contemporary art.

Painters have traditionally been inspired by Seychelles' natural features to produce a wide range of works in media ranging from watercolours to oils, acrylics, collages, metals, aluminium, wood, fabrics, gouache, varnishes, recycled materials, pastels, charcoal, embossing, etching, and giclee prints. Local sculptors (such as Egbert Marday, who was awarded the Seychelles Arts Award for Lifetime Achievement in 2019) produce fine works in wood, stone, bronze and cartonnage. One Seychelles painter, Michael Adams, was awarded the Member of the Order of the British Empire for his services to art.

There are several art galleries around the island, such as the National Gallery in Victoria, the traditional wooden house galleries, including the Kenwyn House Gallery and the Kaz Zanana Art Gallery; the Pagoda Art and Design Gallery in the Seychelles Chinese Culture Centre near the Selwyn Clarke market, and the Eden gallery on Eden Island.

=== Music ===
Music and dance have always played prominent roles in Seychelles culture and local festivities. Rooted in African, Malagasy and European cultures, music characteristically features drums such as the tambour and tam-tam, and simple string instruments. The violin and guitar are relatively recent foreign imports which play a prominent role in contemporary music.

Among popular dances are the Sega, which involves hip-swaying and shuffling of the feet, and the Moutya, a dance dating back to the days of slavery, when it was often used to express strong emotions and discontent.

The music of Seychelles is diverse, a reflection of the fusion of cultures through its history. The folk music of the islands incorporates multiple influences in a syncretic fashion. It includes African rhythms, aesthetic and instrumentation, such as the zez and the bom (known in Brazil as berimbau); European contredanse, polka and mazurka; French folk and pop; sega from Mauritius and Réunion; taarab, soukous and other pan-African genres; and Polynesian, Indian and Arcadian music.

Contombley is a popular form of percussion music, as is Moutya, a fusion of native folk rhythms with Kenyan benga. Kontredans, based on European contra dance, is also popular, especially in district and school competitions during the annual Festival Kreol (International Creole Festival). Moutya playing and dancing often occur at beach bazaars. Music is sung in the Seychellois Creole of the French language, and in French and English.

In 2021, the Moutya, a slave trade-era dance, was added to the UNESCO Intangible Cultural Heritage List as a symbol of psychological comfort in its role of resistance against hardship, poverty, servitude and social injustice.

=== Cuisine ===
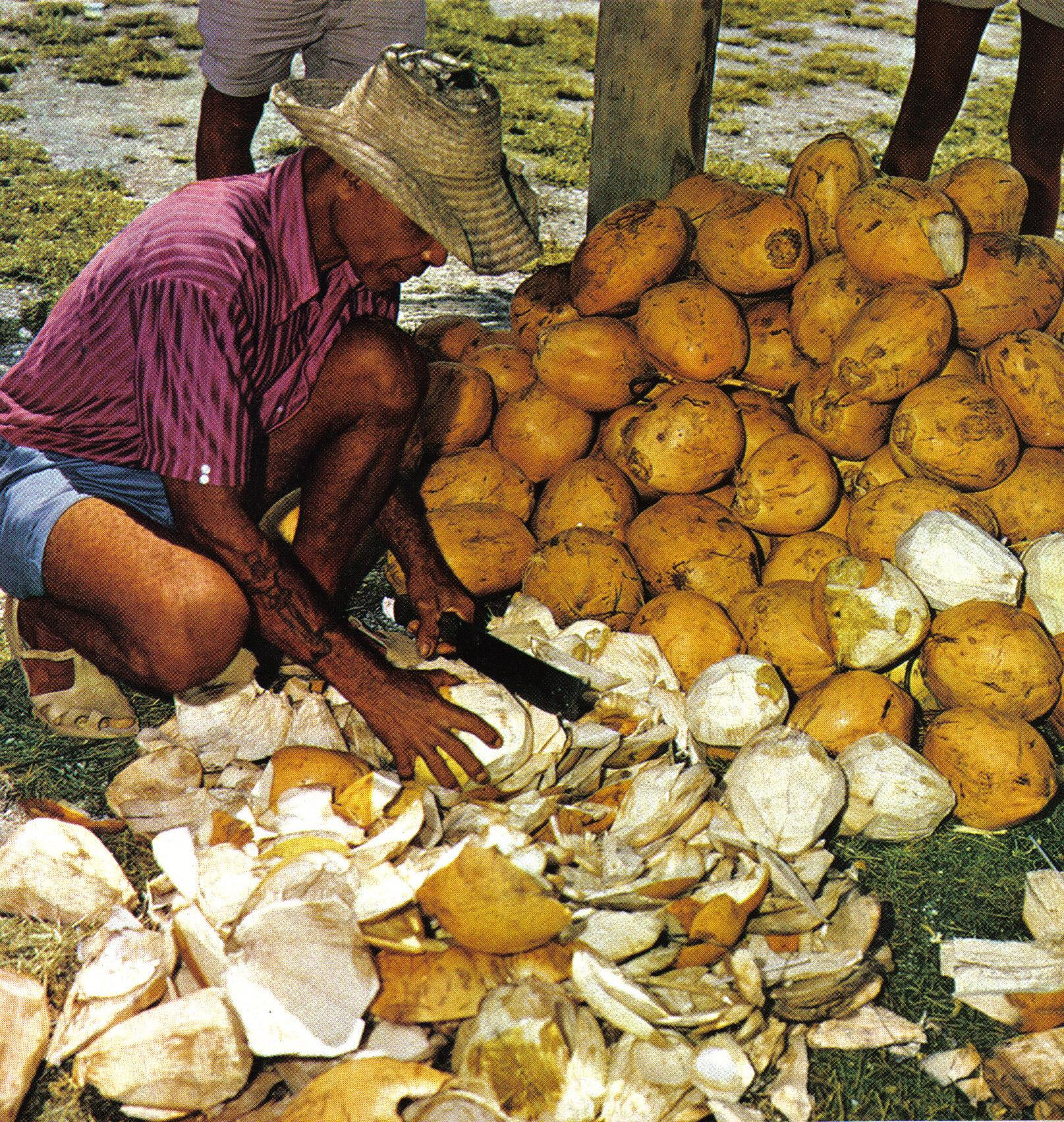
Cutting open tender coconuts for drinking, Seychelles

Staple foods of Seychelles include fish, seafood and shellfish dishes, often accompanied with rice. Fish dishes are cooked several ways, such as steamed, grilled, wrapped in banana leaves, baked, salted and smoked. Curry dishes with rice are also a significant part of the country's cuisine.

Other staples include coconut, breadfruit, mangoes and kordonnyen fish. Dishes are often garnished with fresh flowers.

- Chicken dishes, such as chicken curry and coconut milk.
- Coconut curry
- Dal (lentils)
- Fish curry
- Saffron rice
- Fresh tropical fruits
- Ladob, eaten either as a savoury dish or as a dessert. The dessert version usually consists of ripe plantain and sweet potatoes (but may also include cassava, breadfruit or even corossol), boiled with coconut milk, sugar, nutmeg and vanilla in the form of a pod until the fruit is soft and the sauce is creamy. The savoury dish usually includes salted fish, cooked in a similar fashion to the dessert version, with plantain, cassava and breadfruit, but with salt used in place of sugar (and omitting vanilla).
- Shark chutney typically consists of boiled skinned shark, finely mashed and cooked with squeezed bilimbi juice and lime. It is mixed with onion and spices, with the onion fried and cooked in oil.
- Vegetables

=== Media ===
The main daily newspaper is the Seychelles Nation and Seychelles News Agency dedicated to local government views and current topics. Other newspapers include Le Nouveau Seychelles Weekly, The People, Regar, and Today in Seychelles. Foreign newspapers and magazines are readily available at most bookshops and newsagents. The papers are published mostly in Seychellois Creole, French and English.

Seychelles' prominent digital newspaper Seychelles News Agency was set to cease its operations completely on 1 January 2025, following the decision of the Seychelles government and National Information Service Agency (NISA) after ten years of news reporting in Seychelles.

The main television and radio network, operated by the Seychelles Broadcasting Corporation, offers locally produced news and discussion programmes in the Seychellois Creole language, between 3 pm and 11:30 pm on weekdays and longer hours on weekends. There are also imported English- and French-language television programmes on Seychellois terrestrial television, and international satellite television has grown rapidly in recent years.

=== Sports ===
Seychelles' most popular sport is football, which has significantly grown in popularity in the last decade. In 2015, Seychelles hosted the African Beach Soccer Championship. Ten years later, in May 2025, Seychelles hosted the 2025 FIFA Beach Soccer World Cup making it the first ever FIFA Beach Soccer World Cup to be held in Africa.

=== Women ===
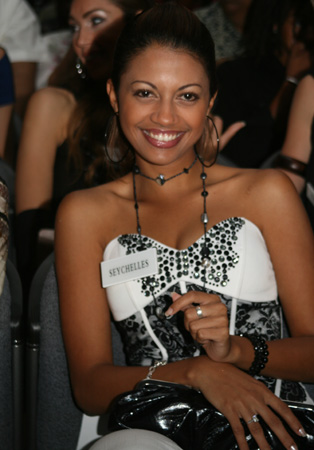
Miss Seychelles 2008, Elena Angione

Mothers tend to be dominant in the household, controlling most expenditure and looking after children's interests. Unwed mothers are the societal norm, and the law requires fathers to support their children. Men are important for their earning ability, but their domestic role is relatively peripheral.

=== LGBT rights ===
Same-sex sexual activity has been legal since 2016. The bill decriminalising homosexuality was approved in a 14–0 vote. Employment discrimination on the basis of sexual orientation is banned in the Seychelles, making it one of the few African countries to have such protections for LGBT people.

=== Education ===
Seychelles has the highest literacy rate of any country in sub-Saharan Africa. According to The World Factbook of the Central Intelligence Agency, as of 2018, 95.9% of the population aged 15 and over can read and write in the Seychelles.

Until the mid-19th century, little formal education was available in Seychelles. The Catholic and Anglican churches opened mission schools in 1851. The Catholic mission later operated boys' and girls' secondary schools with religious brothers and nuns from abroad even after the government became responsible for them in 1944.

A teacher training college opened in 1959, when the supply of locally trained teachers began to grow, and in short time many new schools were established. Since 1981 a system of free education has been in effect, requiring attendance by all children in grades one to nine, beginning at age six. Ninety-four percent of all children attend primary school.

The literacy rate for school-age children rose to more than 90% by the late 1980s. Many older Seychellois had not been taught to read or write in their childhood; adult education classes helped raise adult literacy from 60% to a claimed 96% in 2020.

There are a total of 68 schools in Seychelles. The public school system consists of 23 crèches, 25 primary schools and 13 secondary schools. They are located on Mahé, Praslin, La Digue and Silhouette. Additionally, there are three private schools: École Française, International School and the independent school. All the private schools are on Mahé, and the International School has a branch on Praslin. There are seven post-secondary (non-tertiary) schools: the Seychelles Polytechnic, School of Advanced Level Studies, Seychelles Tourism Academy, University of Seychelles Education, Seychelles Institute of Technology, Maritime Training Centre, Seychelles Agricultural and Horticultural Training Centre and the National Institute for Health and Social Studies.

The administration launched plans to open a university in an attempt to slow down the brain drain that had occurred. The University of Seychelles, initiated in conjunction with the University of London, opened on 17 September 2009 across three locations and offers qualifications awarded by the University of London. The establishment of the university was intended to expand domestic access to higher education and reduce reliance on overseas study.

== Notable people ==
- Kevin Betsy – football coach and former professional footballer.
- Sandra Esparon – singer and performer
- Sonia Grandcourt – writer
- Regina Melanie – writer
- Laurence Norah – travel photographer, writer, and blogger
- Jean-Marc Volcy – musician
- Dr Louis Gaston Labat – physician and pioneer in regional anesthesia

== See also ==
- Outline of Seychelles
- Index of Seychelles-related articles
