= Gaston Labat =

Seychellois physician and anesthesia (1876 - 1934)

Louis Gaston Labat
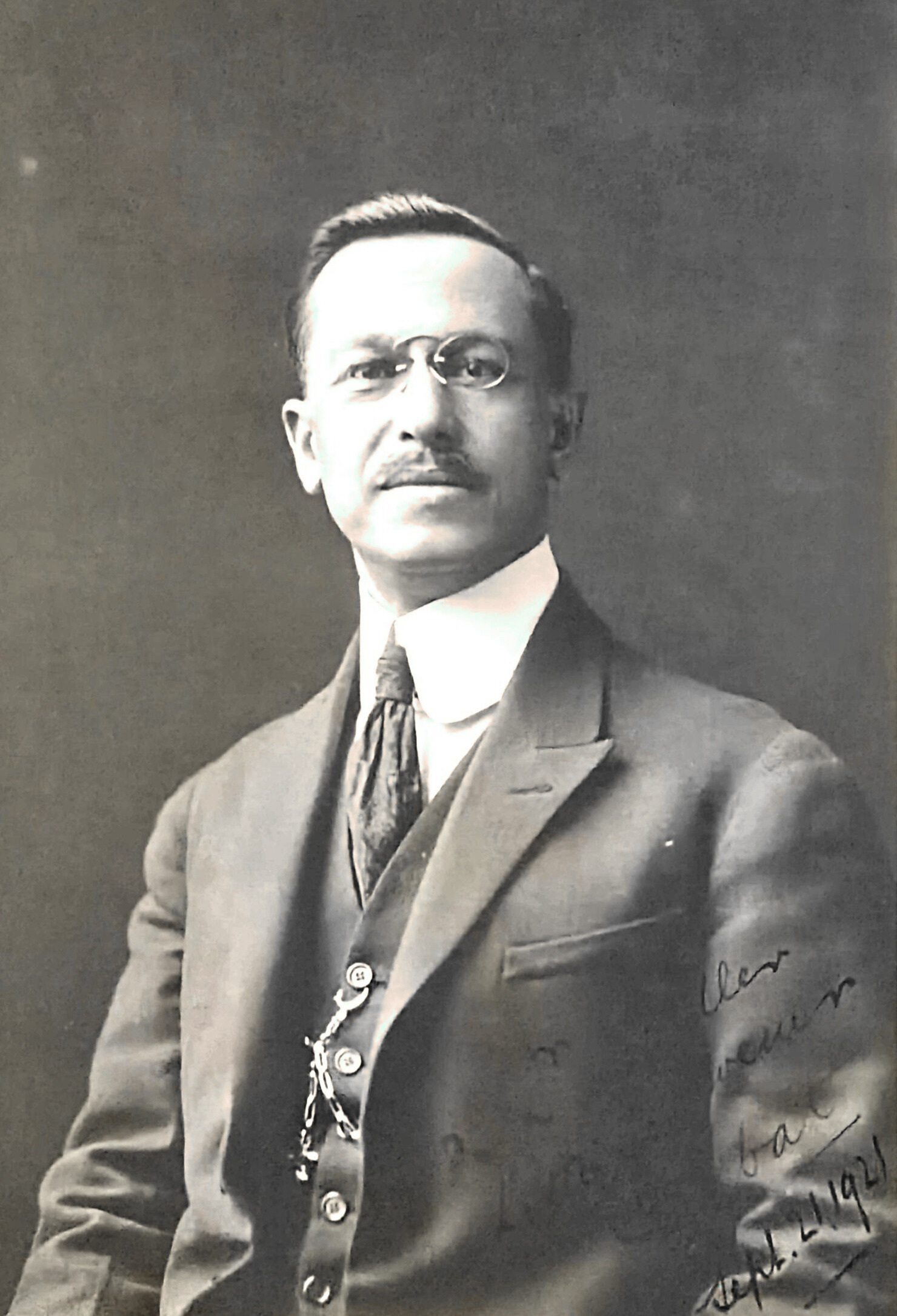
- Born: December 11, 1876; Victoria, Mahé, Seychelles
- Died: October 1, 1934 (aged 57); New York City, United States
- Education: Royal College of Mauritius; University of Montpellier; University of Paris
- Scientific career
- Fields: Anesthesia; local anesthesia; perioperative care

Louis Gaston Labat (December 11, 1876 – October 1, 1934) was a Seychellois-born physician and pioneer in regional anesthesia.

== Early life ==
Gaston Labat was born in 1876 in Victoria on Mahé Island in the Seychelles to French parents, Siméon and Marie Labat, who had originally emigrated from Mauritius. Though his birth was officially registered in January 1877, Labat was born in December 1876.

His father, a trader, had relocated to the Seychelles to establish a business. Gaston was the eldest of three children, followed by two younger sisters. The family later returned to Mauritius after Siméon's death in a shipwreck, where Labat spent much of his childhood and early education.

== Medical career ==
Gaston Labat received his medical training at the Royal College of Mauritius (now Royal College Curepipe). While in Mauritius, Labat worked in his brother-in-law's pharmacy, gaining experience with medicinal compounds and patient care. This early exposure to pharmaceuticals contributed to his later medical career.

Gaston Labat continued his studies in France, first at the University of Montpellier and then at the University of Paris, where he trained under surgeon Victor Pauchet.

In 1920, while observing Victor Pauchet’s surgical techniques in Paris, Charles Horace Mayo was impressed by Labat's regional anesthesia methods and invited him to join the Mayo Clinic in Rochester, Minnesota. There, he authored the influential textbook Regional Anesthesia: Its Technic and Clinical Application which was published in 1922. The book, partly based on Pauchet's work, became the standard reference for decades.

He later moved to New York, co-founding the American Society of Regional Anesthesia (1923).

Gaston Labat pioneered spinal anesthesia techniques in the 1920s and designed an innovative unbreakable nickel spinal needle with a short, sharp bevel to reduce dural trauma. Labat is most famously associated with the "Labat approach" to the sciatic nerve block, a foundational technique in regional anesthesia. This method involves injecting anesthetic near the sciatic nerve at the level of the hip using specific anatomical landmarks.

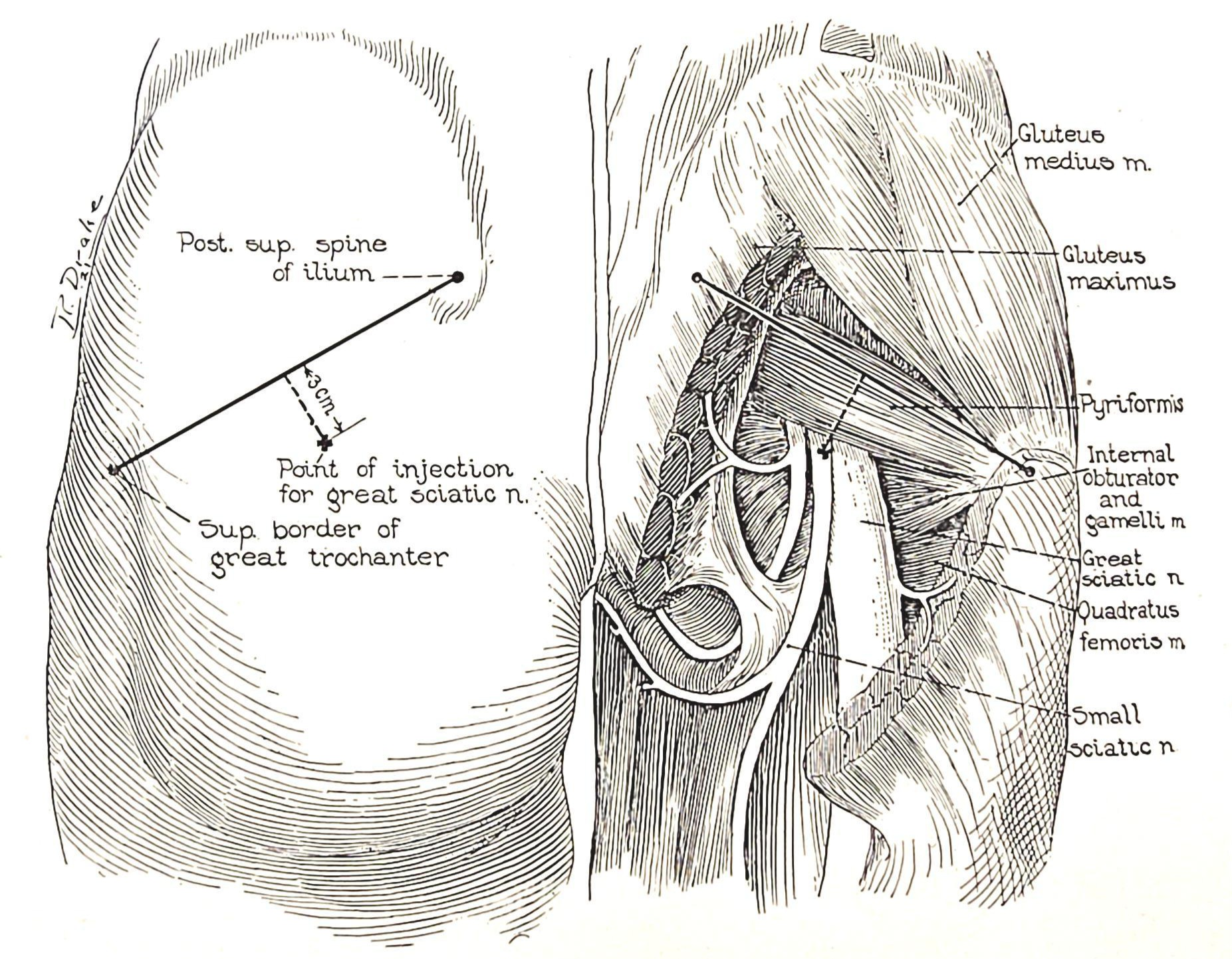
Greater Sciatic Nerve block (Regional Anesthesia - It's Technic and Clinical Application, 1922)

== Legacy ==
- Standardized regional anesthesia techniques.
- Bridged European and American medical practices regarding anesthesia and peri-operative care
- Advanced anesthesia as a distinct medical specialty.
- Founded the American Society of Regional Anesthesia (later evolving into the American Society of Regional Anesthesia and Pain Medicine).

He is often regarded as the "father of regional anesthesia in America" for his work importing and popularizing regional anesthesia.

In honor of his contributions to the field, the American Society of Regional Anesthesia and Pain Medicine (ASRA Pain Medicine) created the Gaston Labat Award. The award recognizes physicians and researchers who have made significant advances in regional anesthesia and pain medicine, following Labat's tradition of innovation in these fields.

== Death ==
Gaston Labat died on October 1, 1934, in New York from postoperative complications causing emphysema and heart failure following a cholecystectomy.
