= Glacis, Seychelles =

Coordinates: 4°34′S 55°26′E

Glacis
- District

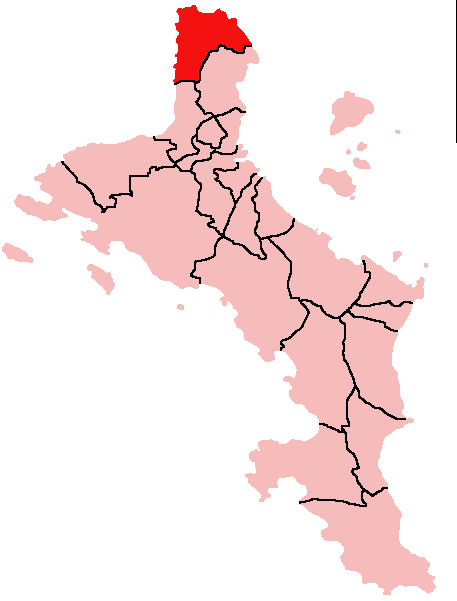
- Location within Mahé Island, Seychelles
- Country: Seychelles

Government
  - District Administrator: Jim Moncherry
  - Member of National Assembly: Hon. Regina Esparon (LDS)

Population (2019 Estimate)
  - Total: 4,016
- Time zone: Seychelles Time

Glacis (French pronunciation: [ɡlasi]) is an administrative district of Seychelles located in the North Region of the island of Mahé. It also encompasses uninhabited Mamelles Island 13 kilometers to the northeast of Mahé, and the tiny Brisan Rocks in between.

Glacis District has an area of 7 km². Between the censuses of 2002 and 2010, the population rose from 3.576 to 3.833.
