= Sonia Grandcourt =

Seychellois writer (1929–2000s)

Sonia Grandcourt (25 May 1929 – c. 2006) was a Seychellois novelist, poet, and children's writer.

== Biography ==
Sonia Grandcourt was born in the Seychelles in 1929.

Grandcourt began writing in 1988 while working as a school art teacher. She wrote in Seychellois Creole, her native language.

Grandcourt would become known for her novels, poetry, and children's books. She first published a pair of novels, Mon'n aprann mon leson in 1991 and Bertran ek Mepol in 1992. With these, she won second prize in the Seychelles Creole language institute Lenstiti Kreol's Creole Novel Competition.

Grandcourt went on to produce several plays, poetry, and short stories, which were collected by Lenstiti Kreol. In 2001, she published the book Rwayalite desten.

Her work is considered a significant contribution to Seychellois Creole literature. In 2006, after her death, the National Arts Council of Seychelles announced a literary award named in her honor. In 2012, she was inducted into a national hall of fame honoring Seychellois women.

Grandcourt was featured in the 2019 overview of Seychellois literature Seychellois Writers: A Biographical Sketch by Diallo Addourahamane.

== Selected works ==
- Mon'n aprann mon leson (1991)
- Bertran ek Mepol (1992)
- Rwayalite desten (2001)
