= Baie Lazare =

Coordinates: 4°45′S 55°29′E

- District

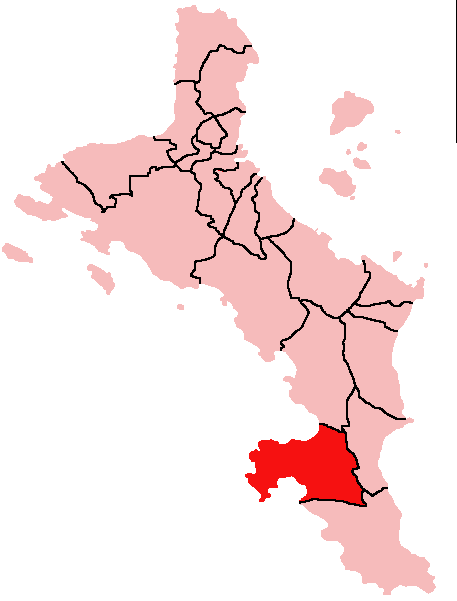
- Location within Mahé Island, Seychelles
- Country: Seychelles

Government
  - District Administrator: Mike Morel
  - Member of National Assembly: Hon. Francois Adelaide (LDS)

Population (2019 Estimate)
  - Total: 3,951
- Time zone: Seychelles Time

Baie Lazare (French pronunciation: [bɛ lazaʁ]) is an administrative district of Seychelles located on the island of Mahé. It is named after the explorer Lazare Picault.
