= Laurence Norah =

Seychellois artist

- Born: 1980
- Occupations: Photographer, Travel blogger
- Spouse: Jessica Norah
- Website: www.findingtheuniverse.com

Laurence Norah (born 1980) is a British / Seychellois travel photographer and blogger.

== Background ==
Laurence Norah was born in 1980 to a British mother and a Seychellois father. Norah's parents worked as hotel managers and he spent his childhood living in various locations in the UK and the Seychelles. In 2009, he left his job as a software engineer and sold off most of this belongings and traveled around Australia for year in a Land Cruiser. In 2010, he started his travel blog, Finding the Universe.

In 2014, he met his now wife Jessica Norah at a travel blogging conference in Italy. The two were married in August 2015 aboard the Queen Mary 2 on a transatlantic voyage, halfway between the United States (her home country) and the UK. Norah and his wife are currently based near Edinburgh, Scotland.

== Career ==
=== Photography ===
Norah's travel photography has appeared in a number of publications and websites including National Geographic, the BBC, Fox News, and Brides.

Norah has won awards for his photography, including Bronze in a category of the SATW Bill Muster Photo Competition in 2019, being named as the eighth Best Travel Photography Blogger in a 2014 USA Today online poll, and winning the Bloggy for best photography on a weblog in 2015. He specializes in travel and landscape photography, but has also shot travel conferences and festivals such as the South by Southwest music festival.

=== Blogging ===
Norah started his travel and photography blog, Finding the Universe, in 2010. Today, he co-runs both Finding the Universe and Independent Travel Cats (a couples travel blog founded by his wife in 2013) with his wife Jessica. He has a large social media following, especially on Instagram and Facebook where the Finding the Universe Facebook fan page has over 1 million followers.

Laurence Norah also served as a board member of the Professional Travel Blogging Association (PTBA) for 4 years, serving as the non-profit organization's president from 2015 to 2016.

=== Appearances ===
Norah is a speaker at travel events and conferences about travel blogging and travel photography, and has spoken at conferences worldwide.

Laurence and his wife have also appeared in online videos, on TV, radio, and podcasts, including an episode of House Hunters International, online video commercials, and a radio show for 98.8 Castle FM.
