= Montea =

Traditional African dance and music genre

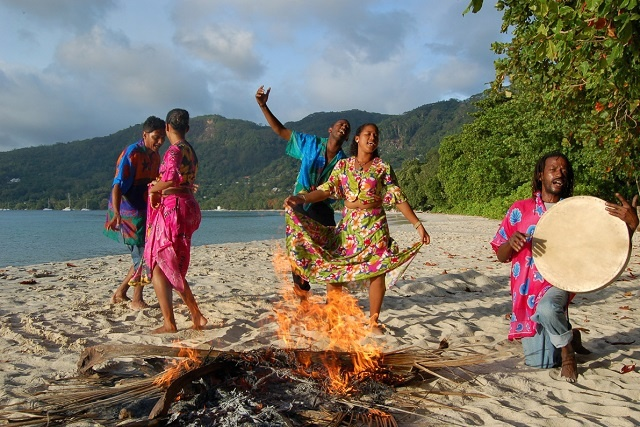
Moutya dance in Seychelles

Moutia or Moutya, is a traditional African dance similar to the Sega, but with often more pronounced suggestive movements. Female and male dancers move in rhythm to the beat of the often single drum made of dried goatskin and lightly heated up by a bonfire prior to the start of the Dance (and regular during the evening). Dancing starts off slowly in time to the beat of the drums, but speeds up and becomes more erotic as the beating becomes faster and faster and faster.

The beat and dance are always accompanied by singing, which usually recounts the hardships and joys of everyday life. Until the late 1970s, the Moutya was considered more of a risqué dance and generally shunned.

== Inscription on the Intangible Cultural Heritage List of Humanity ==
In 2019, Seychelles attempted to register Moutya as an intangible cultural heritage site, but the application was deemed incomplete. Registration finally takes place in 2021. David André, Seychelles' Secretary General for Culture, describes the registration as an achievement, which he believes will enable the cultural element to be passed on to future generations. According to the official UNESCO description, the moutya expresses cultural identity and preserves traditional elements. It is transmitted through imitation, documentation and research.
