= Jean-Marc Volcy =

- Born: Jean-Marc Volcy; January 29, 1966 (age 59); Baie Lazare, Mahé, Seychelles
- Genres: séga, creole, folk
- Occupations: singer-songwriter, performer
- Instruments: vocals, guitar
- Years active: 1980s–present
- Website: jeanmarcvolcy.com

Jean-Marc Volcy (born January 29, 1966) is a Seychellois composer, performer and songwriter regarded as one of the pioneering musicians to propagate creole music in Seychelles. His repertoire of music is a fusion of modern creole pop with traditional folk music. His contributions to music in Seychelles has seen him win numerous awards including the Airtel Music Awards, Les Voix de l'Océan Indien and the Cable Tunes Awards. In February 2017, he was inducted into the Seychelles' Musicians Wall of Fame.

== Discography ==
=== Albums ===
- Gou Kreol – (1994)
- Leko Bake – (1997)
- Bel Koud Kannon – (2002)
- Bon Bon – (2005)
- Sove Lavi – (2006)
- Bon Bon Bon - (2007)
- Lanmizik i Mazik – (2011)
- Kapisien - (2022)
