= Deaths in February 1999 =

The following is a list of notable deaths in February 1999.

Entries for each day are listed alphabetically by surname. A typical entry lists information in the following sequence:

- Name, age, country of citizenship at birth, subsequent country of citizenship (if applicable), reason for notability, cause of death (if known), and reference.

== February 1999 ==
=== 1 ===
- Marion Boyars, 71, British book publisher, pancreatic cancer.
- Paul Calvert, 81, Canadian baseball player (Cleveland Indians, Washington Senators, Detroit Tigers).
- Alejandro Galindo, 93, Mexican screenwriter and film director.
- Hank Harris, 75, American gridiron football player (Washington Redskins).
- Rudolf Kárpáti, 78, Hungarian fencer and Olympic champion (1948, 1952, 1956, 1960).
- Barış Manço, 56, Turkish rock musician, actor, and show host, heart attack.
- Paul Mellon, 91, American philanthropist.
- Robin Nedwell, 52, British actor, heart attack.
- St. Clair Pinckney, 68, American saxophonist.
- Harold E. Shear, 80, United States Navy admiral.
- Benjamin Elazari Volcani, 84, Israeli microbiologist.
- Julius Wechter, 63, American musician and composer, cancer.

=== 2 ===
- Marie Van Brittan Brown, 76, American nurse and inventor.
- Pat Dannaher, 86, South African Olympic sprinter (1936).
- Deborah Makepeace, 41, British television, theatre and voiceover actress, cancer.
- Michel Mathiot, 72, French Olympic gymnast (1948, 1952, 1956, 1960).
- David McComb, 36, Australian rock musician, heart failure.
- Jerry Nagel, 70, American basketball player (Fort Wayne Pistons).
- August Neuburger, 96, German politician and member of the Bundestag.
- Vladimír Petlák, 52, Czech volleyball player and Olympic medalist (1968, 1972, 1976).
- Vilmos Tátrai, 86, Hungarian classical violinist .
- Tunku Puan Besar Kurshiah, 87, Malayan queen of Negeri Sembilan.

=== 3 ===
- Norman Bluhm, 77, American painter, heart failure.
- Luc Borrelli, 33, French football player, traffic collision.
- William C. Brown, 82, American electrical engineer.
- Jim Cope, 91, Australian politician.
- Alexei Gorokhov, 71, Soviet violinist.
- Gwen Guthrie, 48, American singer-songwriter and pianist, uterine cancer.
- Mikko Hietanen, 87, Finnish long-distance runner, European Champion, world record holder and Olympian (1948, 1952).
- Alfred Janes, 87, Welsh artist.
- Herbert Klynn, 81, American animator.
- Ann-Margret Nirling, 81, Swedish diver and Olympian (1936).
- Yu Qiuli, 84, Chinese Army general and politician.
- Leo Schrall, 91, American baseball player and manager.
- John S. Service, 89, American diplomat.
- Vin Sullivan, 87, American comic book editor, artist and publisher.

=== 4 ===
- Luigi Bernabò Brea, 88, Italian archaeologist.
- Erich Hartmann, 76, German-American photographer.
- Joe Hayes, 63, English football player.
- Arthur Mann, 51, Scottish football player.
- Vittorio Marzotto, 76, Italian racing driver.
- Sean Sellers, 29, American juvenile convict, execution by lethal injection.
- Ivan Stevović, 88, Yugoslav footballer and manager.

=== 5 ===
- Neville Bonner, 76, Australian politician, first indigenous Member of Parliament.
- John L. Cotter, 87, American archaeologist, cancer.
- Rembert Delden, 81, German politician member of the Bundestag.
- Leo Echegaray, 38, Filipino convict, execution by lethal injection.
- Nicholas Krushenick, 69, American abstract painter, liver cancer.
- Wassily Leontief, 93, Russian economist and Nobel Prize laureate.
- Mariya Osipova, 90, Soviet partisan during World War II.
- Indrani Rahman, 68, Indian classical dancer.
- Linda Sini, 74, Italian film actress.

=== 6 ===
- Thomas Banyacya, 89, American Native American traditional leader.
- Erwin Blask, 88, German athlete and Olympian (1936).
- Henry S. Clark, 95, American horse trainer.
- Danny Dayton, 75, American actor (All in the Family, Guys and Dolls, Ed Wood), emphysema.
- Kyra Downton, 85, Russian-born American equestrian and Olympian (1968).
- Don Dunstan, 72, Australian politician, lung cancer.
- Robert Eger, 75-76, Swiss Olympic field hockey player (1948).
- Yuriy Istomin, 54, Soviet Ukrainian footballer and Olympian (1972).
- Jalal Keshmiri, 60, Iranian athlete and Olympian (1964, 1968).
- Jimmy Roberts, 75, American singer and performer, bone cancer.
- Hans Zikeli, 88, Romanian Olympic handball player (1936).

=== 7 ===
- Hussein I of Jordan, 63, Jordanian monarch, King of Jordan (1952–1999), lymphoma.
- Andrew Keller, 73, British scientist.
- William Ludwig, 86, American screenwriter (Interrupted Melody, Oklahoma!, Athena), Oscar winner (1956), Parkinson's disease.
- Umberto Maglioli, 70, Italian racing driver.
- Antonio Pacenza, 70, Argentine boxer and Olympian (1952).
- George E. Shambaugh Jr., 95, American otolaryngologist and pioneer in deafness treatments.
- Bobby Troup, 80, American actor (Emergency!, M*A*S*H) and songwriter ("(Get Your Kicks on) Route 66").

=== 8 ===
- Fred Bohannon, 40, American football player (Pittsburgh Steelers).
- Richard Boone, 68, American jazz trombonist and scat singer.
- Meredith Edwards, 81, Welsh actor and writer.
- Madeleine Frieden-Kinnen, 83, Luxembourgish politician.
- Per Knudsen, 73, Danish football player and Olympian (1948, 1952).
- Iris Murdoch, 79, Irish-born British novelist, poet and philosopher, Alzheimer's disease.
- Caroline Robbins, 95, British historian.
- Carl Sumner, 90, American baseball player (Boston Red Sox).
- Krishnaswamy Sundarji, 70, British Indian Army officer.
- Giuseppe Tatarella, 63, Italian politician, heart attack.
- Rudolf Troppert, 89, Austrian Olympic weightlifter (1936).

=== 9 ===
- Richard Allen, 66, British abstract artist and printmaker, amyotrophic lateral sclerosis.
- Benjamin Bwalya, 37, Zambian footballer and coach, cerebral malaria.
- Enzo Forcella, 77, Italian essayist, historian and journalist.
- Aleksander Gieysztor, 82, Polish medievalist historian.
- Mary LaRoche, 78, American actress and singer.
- Len Levy, 77, American athlete (Cleveland/Los Angeles Rams, Los Angeles Dons).
- Wilhelm Mahlow, 85, German rower and Olympian (1936).
- Bryan Mosley, 67, British television and film actor, (Coronation Street), heart attack.
- Bernhard Paus, 88, Norwegian orthopedic surgeon.
- Jaturun Siripongs, 47, Thai murderer, execution by lethal injection.
- Inga-Stina Robson, 79, Anglo-Swedish political activist.

=== 10 ===
- Yuri Borienko, 66, Polish actor and wrestler. (On Her Majesty's Secret Service)
- Ashley Bramall, 83, British politician.
- Robert Clothier, 77, Canadian actor.
- Hernán Santa Cruz, 93, Chilean diplomat and United Nations delegate.
- Joan Curran, 82, Welsh scientist, cancer.
- Ann-Marie Gyllenspetz, 66, Swedish actress.
- Billy Houliston, 77, Scottish footballer.
- Joe M. Kilgore, 80, American combat pilot during World War II and politician, member of the United States House of Representatives (1955-1965).
- Herb Krautblatt, 72, American basketball player.
- Birger Leirud, 74, Norwegian high jumper and Olympian (1948, 1952).
- Jean Levavasseur, 74, French fencer and Olympian (1948, 1952).
- Y. B. Mangunwijaya, 69, Indonesian architect, writer and Catholic religious leader.
- Joseph Marie Nguyễn Tùng Cương, 79, Vietnamese Roman Catholic prelate, bishop of Hải Phòng (1979–1999).
- Gideon Rafael, 86, Israeli diplomat.

=== 11 ===
- William Alonso, 66, Argentinian-American planner and economist.
- Leonard J. Arrington, 81, American Mormon historian, heart failure.
- Danny Barber, 43, American serial killer, execution by lethal injection.
- John Brack, 78, Australian painter.
- Philip Brownstein, 92, American basketball coach (Chicago Stags).
- Jaki Byard, 76, American jazz musician, composer and arranger, shot.
- Toni Fisher, 74, American pop singer, heart attack.
- Stoyan Gadev, 67, Bulgarian actor.
- Werner Korff, 87, German ice hockey player and Olympic medalist (1932).
- Dragan Kovačić, 59, Yugoslav-Croatian basketball player and Olympian (1964).
- Reidar Kristiansen, 71, Norwegian footballer.
- Rose Mbowa, 56, Ugandan writer, actress, academic and feminist.
- Hugh McCullough, 82, American gridiron football player.
- Brian Parsons, 65, English cricket player.
- Xiao Qian, 89, Chinese essayist, editor and journalist.
- Nikolai Sergeyev, 89, Soviet admiral.
- Whitney Tower, 75, American Thoroughbred horse racing journalist, complications from a stroke.

=== 12 ===
- Paul Bairoch, 68, Belgian-Swiss economic historian.
- André Devigny, 82, French soldier and member of the Résistance.
- Jimmy Dudley, 89, American baseball player and sportscaster.
- Rexhep Krasniqi, 92, Albanian-American historian, nationalist, anti-communist politician and activist.
- Grace Panvini, 91, American soprano and voice teacher
- Heinz Schubert, 73, German actor, drama teacher and photographer, pneumonia.
- Michel Seuphor, 97, Belgian painter.

=== 13 ===
- Peko Dapčević, 85, Yugoslav communist.
- Michael Higgins, 90, American glass artist.
- Kåre Hovda, 55, Norwegian biathlete and Olympian (1972).
- Gary Jennings, 70, American author, heart failure.
- Ron McLean, 60, Australian politician, asbestos-related lung condition.
- Mats Nyberg, 39, Swedish Olympic sailor (1988, 1992, 1996).
- Carles Sabater, 36, Catalan singer and actor, respiratory arrest.

=== 14 ===
- Sam Bartholomew, 81, American gridiron football player (Philadelphia Eagles).
- John Ehrlichman, 73, United States Domestic Policy Council and Watergate scandal conspirator, diabetes.
- Jimmy Florian, 75, American racing driver.
- Nikolai Khlystov, 66, Soviet Russian ice hockey player and Olympian (1956).
- Buddy Knox, 65, American singer and songwriter, lung cancer.
- Hillel Seidel, 78, Israeli politician.
- Joseph Francis Shea, 73, American aerospace engineer and NASA manager.
- Raymond Thompson, 87, American competition swimmer and Olympian (1932).
- Majken Åberg, 80, Swedish discus thrower and Olympian (1948).

=== 15 ===
- Agnes Bernelle, 75, Berlin-born expatriate actress and singer.
- Keith Carey, 78, American basketball player.
- Jeffery Cohelan, 84, American politician and political activist.
- Billy Garrett, 65, American racecar driver.
- Lloyd Jackson, 87, Canadian ice hockey player (New York Americans).
- Henry Way Kendall, 72, American physicist and recipient of the Nobel Prize in Physics, drowned.
- Aigars Kriķis, 44, Soviet and Latvian luger and Olympian (1976, 1980).
- Big L, 24, American Freestyle rapper (D.I.T.C.), shot.
- Gordon Neil Stewart, 86, Australian writer.
- Ferenc Vozar, 53, Hungarian-born German ice hockey player and Olympic medalist (1976).

=== 16 ===
- Björn Afzelius, 52, Swedish progg singer and guitarist, lung cancer.
- Necil Kazım Akses, 90, Turkish classical composer.
- Guillermo Arellano, 90, Chilean football player.
- Fritzi Burger, 88, Austrian figure skater and Olympian (1928, 1932).
- Petre Crowder, 79, British barrister and politician.
- Ugo Grappasonni, 76, Italian professional golfer.
- Herbert S. Green, 78, British–Australian physicist.
- James Hill, 72, British politician.
- Henk Hofstra, 94, Dutch politician.
- Johan Kvandal, 79, Norwegian composer.
- Michael Larson, 49, American game show contestant, throat cancer.
- John Lomakoski, 58, American football player (Detroit Lions).
- Alexandre-Athenase Noghès, 82, Monegasque tennis player and husband of Princess Antoinette of Monaco.
- Bailey Olter, 66, Micronesian political figure.
- Betty Roché, 81, American blues singer.

=== 17 ===
- Thomas James Carr, 89, British artist.
- Kurt Robert Eissler, 90, Austrian psychoanalyst.
- Jaime Hurtado, 62, Ecuadorian politician, shot.
- Cliff McBride, 90, Canadian ice hockey player (Toronto Maple Leafs).
- William D. McElroy, 82, American biochemist and academic.
- Sunshine Parker, 71, American actor (Tremors, Road House, Pee-wee's Big Adventure), pneumonia.
- Shirley Stoler, 69, American actress, heart failure.
- Tania, 90, Spanish tango singer known as "Tania".
- R.S. Unni, 73, Indian politician and trade unionist.

=== 18 ===
- Felipe Alfau, 96, Spanish-American novelist and poet.
- Andreas Feininger, 92, American photographer.
- Tibor Házi, 87, Hungarian table tennis player.
- Nikolay Latyshev, 85, Soviet and Russian football player and referee.
- Olle Nordemar, 84, Swedish cinematographer, screenwriter, film director and producer.
- Noam Pitlik, 66, American actor and television director, lung cancer.

=== 19 ===
- Mohammad Mohammad Sadeq al-Sadr, 55, Iraqi Shia marja', shot.
- Khumar Barabankvi, 79, Indian Urdu poet and lyricist.
- Hermann Baumann, 78, Swiss Olympic wrestler (1948).
- Wilford Berry, Jr., 36, American convicted murderer, execution by lethal injection.
- Robert Coulson, 70, American science fiction writer and bookseller.
- Trudy Desmond, 53, Canadian jazz singer.
- Richard E. Dutrow, Sr., 61, American thoroughbred racehorse trainer.
- Lloyd La Beach, 76, Panamanian sprinter, 100 meters world record holder, and Olympian (1948).
- Lady Pansy Lamb, 94, English writer also known as "Pansy Pakenham".
- Georg Meier, 88, German motorcycle racer.
- Primo Miller, 83, American gridiron football player (Cleveland Rams).
- Constantin Oțet, 58, Romanian football coach.
- Paul Schmidt, 65, American actor, poet, playwright and essayist.
- John Styler, 75, American basketball player.

=== 20 ===
- Howard Boatwright, 80, American composer, violinist and musicologist.
- Willard R. Espy, 88, American philologist, writer and poet.
- Lotti van der Gaag, 75, Dutch sculptor and painter.
- Frans Grootjans, 77, Belgian politician and minister.
- Molly Harrower, 93, American clinical psychologist.
- Sarah Kane, 28, English playwright, suicide by hanging.
- Joe Kaylor, 82, American Olympic handball player (1936).
- Al Krueger, 79, American gridiron football player (Washington Redskins, Los Angeles Dons).
- Buck Rogers, 86, American baseball player (Washington Senators).
- Joe Rossi, 77, American baseball player (Cincinnati Reds).
- Michael Sgan-Cohen, 54, Israeli artist, art historian, curator and critic.
- Gene Siskel, 53, American film critic (Chicago Tribune) and television journalist (At the Movies), brain cancer.

=== 21 ===
- Víctor Castellanos, 64, Guatemalan Olympic sports shooter (1968, 1972).
- Gertrude B. Elion, 81, American biochemist, pharmacologist and Nobel Prize recipient .
- George Gill, 90, American baseball player (Detroit Tigers, St. Louis Browns).
- Hideo Itokawa, 86, Japanese aircraft designer and rocketry pioneer.
- Ilmari Juutilainen, 85, Finnish flying ace during World War II.
- Kaya, 38, Mauritian musician and creator of the seggae genre.
- Walter Lini, 57, Prime Minister of Vanuatu.
- Wilmer Mizell, 68, American baseball player (St. Louis Cardinals, Pittsburgh Pirates, New York Mets), and politician, member of the United States House of Representatives (1969-1975).
- Jørgen Leschly Sørensen, 76, Danish footballer and Olympian (1948).
- Leyla Vakilova, 72, Azerbaijani ballerina and ballet teacher.

=== 22 ===
- Bitto Albertini, 74, Italian film director and screenwriter.
- William Bronk, 81, American poet.
- Shane Devine, 73, American district judge (United States District Court for the District of New Hampshire).
- Charles Gerhardt, 72, American conductor, record producer, and arranger.
- Howie Haak, 87, American baseball scout.
- Carlos Hathcock, 56, United States Marine Corps sniper, multiple sclerosis.
- Menno Oosting, 34, Dutch tennis player, traffic collision.
- Pat Upton, 54, Irish politician and veterinarian, heart attack.

=== 23 ===
- Isaac Alfaro, 79, Mexican Olympic basketball player (1948).
- Sir Anthony Nutting, 3rd Baronet, 79, British diplomat and politician, heart failure.
- Stanley Dance, 88, British jazz writer and record producer, pneumonia.
- Ruth Gipps, 78, English composer, oboist, pianist, and conductor.
- Hughie Lee-Smith, 83, American artist, cancer.
- Gershon Legman, 81, American cultural critic and folklorist, complications following a stroke.
- Joseph Leo McGlynn Jr., 74, American district judge (United States District Court for the Eastern District of Pennsylvania).
- Chip Myers, 53, American football player (San Francisco 49ers, Cincinnati Bengals), heart attack.
- David Chilton Phillips, 74, British biologist, prostate cancer.
- Heinrich Schmid, 77, Swiss linguist.
- Leo Shoals, 82, American baseball player.
- Rick Wilson, 33, American professional wrestler, suicide by gunshot.

=== 24 ===
- David Daube, 90, German scholar of ancient law.
- Andre Dubus, 62, American short story writer and essayist, heart attack.
- Virginia Foster Durr, 95, American white civil rights activist and lobbyist.
- David Eccles, 1st Viscount Eccles, 94, English politician.
- Fathy Ghanem, 74, Egyptian writer.
- Stefan Kostrzewski, 96, Polish Olympic sprinter (1924, 1928).
- Hubert Loisel, 86, Austrian Olympic fencer (1936, 1948, 1952).
- Enzo Menegotti, 73, Italian football player and Olympian (1948).
- Derek Nimmo, 68, English actor and author, fall.
- Catharina Roodzant, 102, Dutch female chess master.
- Ahmed Sharif, 78, Bangladeshi philosopher, writer and academic.
- Sir Frank Walcott, 82, Barbadian politician, diplomat and umpire.
- Vann "Piano Man" Walls, 80, American R&B musician, cancer.
- Johnnie Wittig, 84, American baseball player (New York Giants, Boston Red Sox).

=== 25 ===
- Louis Bourban, 81, Swiss Olympic cross-country skier (1948).
- Dina Dreyfus, 88, French anthropologist, sociologist, and philosopher.
- Earl Huckleberry, 88, American baseball player (Philadelphia Athletics).
- Murad Ozdoev, 76, Ingush flying ace during World War II.
- Sol Schoenbach, 84, American bassoonist and teacher.
- Glenn T. Seaborg, 86, American nuclear chemist and recipient of the Nobel Prize in Chemistry (1951), complications of a stroke.
- Štěpán Zavřel, 66, Czech painter, graphic artist and writer.

=== 26 ===
- Michael Avallone, 74, American author.
- Jean Coulomb, 94, French geophysicist and mathematician.
- Annibale Frossi, 87, Italian football player, manager, and Olympian (1936).
- Elbridge T. Gerry, 90, American banker and polo player.
- John L. Goldwater, 83, American comic book editor and publisher.
- János Péter, 88, Hungarian politician.
- José Quintero, 74, Panamanian theatre director and pedagogue, esophageal cancer.
- Opoku Ware II, 79, 15th Emperor-King of the Ashanti people.
- Bjørn Wiik, 62, Norwegian physicist, domestic accident.

=== 27 ===
- George Hughley, 59, American football player (Washington Redskins), and coach, traffic collision.
- Mary Johnson Lowe, 74, American district judge (United States District Court for the Southern District of New York).
- Bob McNeish, 86, American football player and coach.
- Vida Steinert, 96, New Zealand painter.
- Horace Tapscott, 64, American jazz pianist and composer.
- Jeanne Vidal, 90, French Olympic fencer (1932).
- Luis Vidal, 82, Chilean football player.

=== 28 ===
- Anthea Askey, 65, English actress.
- Dave Bedwell, 70, British racing cyclist.
- Ara Harutyunyan, 70, Armenian sculptor and graphic artist.
- Clarence Henry, 72, American boxer.
- Lionel Berry, 2nd Viscount Kemsley, 89, British politician, peer and newspaper editor.
- Kenny Robinson, 29, American baseball player (Toronto Blue Jays, Kansas City Royals), traffic collision.
- Alfred Sapecky, 86, American Olympic rower (1936).
- Bill Talbert, 80, American tennis player.
- Bing Xin, 98, Chinese writer.
