= 1754 =

1754 in various calendars
- Gregorian calendar: 1754; MDCCLIV
- Ab urbe condita: 2507
- Armenian calendar: 1203; ԹՎ ՌՄԳ
- Assyrian calendar: 6504
- Balinese saka calendar: 1675–1676
- Bengali calendar: 1160–1161
- Berber calendar: 2704
- British Regnal year: 27 Geo. 2 – 28 Geo. 2
- Buddhist calendar: 2298
- Burmese calendar: 1116
- Byzantine calendar: 7262–7263
- Chinese calendar: 癸酉年 (Water Rooster); 4451 or 4244 — to — 甲戌年 (Wood Dog); 4452 or 4245
- Coptic calendar: 1470–1471
- Discordian calendar: 2920
- Ethiopian calendar: 1746–1747
- Hebrew calendar: 5514–5515
- Hindu calendars
- Vikram Samvat: 1810–1811
- Shaka Samvat: 1675–1676
- Kali Yuga: 4854–4855
- Holocene calendar: 11754
- Igbo calendar: 754–755
- Iranian calendar: 1132–1133
- Islamic calendar: 1167–1168
- Japanese calendar: Hōreki 4 (宝暦４年)
- Javanese calendar: 1679–1680
- Julian calendar: Gregorian minus 11 days
- Korean calendar: 4087
- Minguo calendar: 158 before ROC 民前158年
- Nanakshahi calendar: 286
- Thai solar calendar: 2296–2297
- Tibetan calendar: ཆུ་མོ་བྱ་ལོ་ (female Water-Bird); 1880 or 1499 or 727 — to — ཤིང་ཕོ་ཁྱི་ལོ་ (male Wood-Dog); 1881 or 1500 or 728

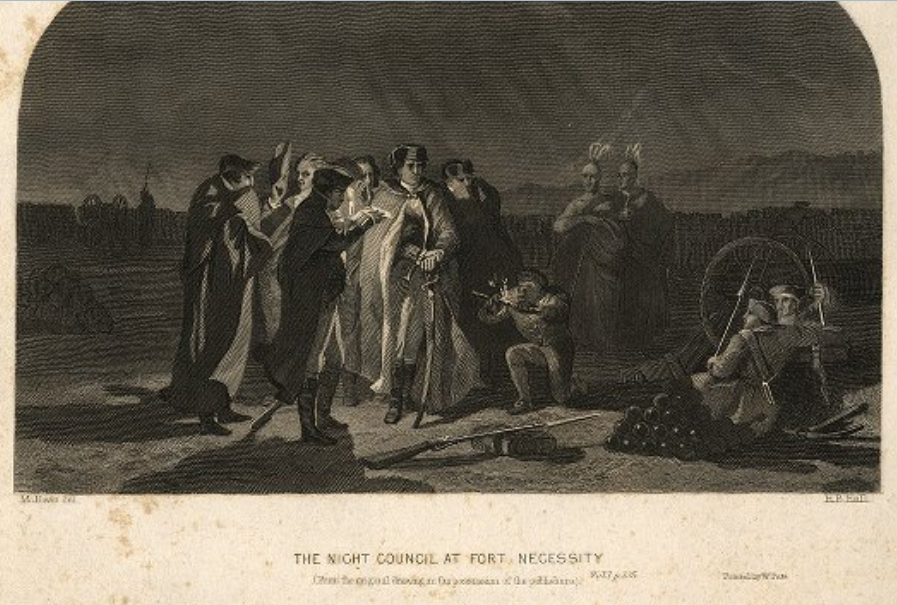
May 14: The Battle of Fort Necessity begins the French and Indian War.

1754 (MDCCLIV) was a common year starting on Tuesday of the Gregorian calendar and a common year starting on Saturday of the Julian calendar, the 1754th year of the Common Era (CE) and Anno Domini (AD) designations, the 754th year of the 2nd millennium, the 54th year of the 18th century, and the 5th year of the 1750s decade. As of the start of 1754, the Gregorian calendar was 11 days ahead of the Julian calendar, which remained in localized use until 1923.

== Events ==
=== January–March ===
- January 28 – Horace Walpole, in a letter to Horace Mann, coins the word serendipity.
- February 22 – Expecting an attack by Portuguese-speaking militias in the Viceroyalty of the Río de la Plata, the indigenous Guarani people residing in the Misiones Orientales stage an attack on a small Brazilian Portuguese settlement on the Rio Pardo in what is now the Brazilian state of Rio Grande do Sul. The attack by 300 Guarani soldiers from the missions at San Luis, San Lorenzo and San Juan Bautista is repelled with a loss of 30 Guarani and is the opening of the Guarani War
- February 25 – Guatemalan Sergeant Major Melchor de Mencos y Varón departs the city of Santiago de los Caballeros de Guatemala with an infantry battalion to fight British pirates that are reportedly disembarking on the coasts of Petén (modern-day Belize), and sacking the nearby towns.
- March 16 – Ten days after the death of British Prime Minister Henry Pelham, his brother Thomas Pelham-Holles, 1st Duke of Newcastle, forms a government as the new Prime Minister of Great Britain.
- March 25 – The Clandestine Marriages Act 1753 comes into force in England and Wales, placing marriage in that jurisdiction on a statutory basis for the first time.

=== April–June ===
- April 30 – Battle of San Felipe and the Cobá Lagoon: Guatemalan Sergeant Mayor Melchor de Mencos y Varón and his troops defeat the British pirates.
- May 14 – The Royal and Ancient Golf Club of St Andrews is founded in Scotland.
- May 28 – French and Indian War: Battle of Jumonville Glen – The war begins when George Washington, 22, leads a company of militia from the Colony of Virginia, in an ambush on a force of 35 French Canadians.
- June 19 – The Albany Congress of seven northern colonies proposes an American Union.

=== July–September ===
- July 3 – French and Indian War – Battle of Fort Necessity: George Washington surrenders Fort Necessity to French Capt. Louis Coulon de Villiers, the only surrender in Washington's military career.
- July 10 – The Albany Plan of Union is given official approval by the delegates from New York, Pennsylvania, Maryland, Rhode Island, New Hampshire and Massachusetts, with Connecticut opposing. The plan approved at the meeting in Albany, New York is based on Benjamin Franklin's suggestions of "a general union of the British colonies on the continent" for a common defense policy. As amended at the assembly, the proposed union calls for the British Parliament to approve the arrangement, which would encompass all of the British North American colonies except for Georgia and Nova Scotia. The plan, to be considered by the individual colonies for ratification, provides for an inter-colonial legislature (the Grand Council) composed of between two and seven representatives for each colony, depending on population. It also provides for a "President General" who can veto Grand Council legislation, a common defense budget with colonies contributing proportionately to their representation, and an inter-colonial army whose officers would be selected by the Grand Council.
- July 17 – Classes begin at Columbia University, founded on October 31 as King's College by royal charter of King George II of Great Britain. The college is originally located in Lower Manhattan in the Province of New York. Instruction is suspended in 1776, and the school reopens in 1784 as Columbia College. With the college's growth in the 19th century, it is renamed Columbia University in 1896.
- August 6 – The British North American Province of Georgia is created. Originally established in 1732 as a place for impoverished English citizens and debt prison parolees to make a new life, is given its first royal government. Administered for 22 years by the Board of Trustees for the Establishment of the Colony of Georgia in America, chaired by philanthropist James Oglethorpe, the colony is transferred by the Trustees to the British crown's Board of Trade and Plantations. King George II, for whom the colony was named, follows the Board's recommendation by proclaiming Georgia a royal province, and appointing Royal Navy Captain John Reynolds as the first Royal Governor. Reynolds arrives in Savannah on October 29 to take office.
- August 17 – Pennsylvania becomes the first of the British colonies to address Benjamin Franklin's Albany Plan for an inter-colonial union. With Franklin absent from Philadelphia, Pennsylvania's House of Representatives votes against to not consider the Plan at all, and to not refer it to the next legislative session for debate.
- August 19 – Lieutenant Colonel George Washington is forced to confront his first mutiny as 25 members of his Virginia militia refuse to obey orders from their officers. Washington, who is attending church services at the time, quickly suppresses the rebellion and the mutineers are imprisoned before more join.
- August 30 – New Hampshire settlers Susannah Willard Johnson and her family are taken hostage by the Abenaki Indians during an attack near Charlestown. Nine months pregnant at the time of their capture, Johnson gives birth two days later to a child, whom she names Elizabeth Captive Johnson. For the next two years, the family is held for ransom in Canada before she is released. In 1796, she will recount the story in a popular memoir, A Narrative of the Captivity of Mrs. Johnson.
- September 2 – A powerful earthquake strikes Constantinople shortly after 9 o'clock in the evening. A Scottish physician, Mordach Mackenzie, reports in a letter that the tremor damaged or destroyed numerous buildings and comments, "Some say there were 2000 people destroyed by this calamity, in the town and suburbs; some 900; and others reduce them to 60, who, by what I have seen, are nearer the truth."
- September 11 – Anthony Henday, an English explorer, becomes the first white man to reach the Canadian Rockies, after climbing a ridge above the Red Deer River near what is now Innisfail, Alberta.

=== October–December ===
- October 24 – China's Qianlong Emperor reverses a longstanding policy that barred Chinese subjects from ever returning to China if they remained out of the country for more than three years.
- October 31 – What will become Columbia University is chartered as "a College in the Province of New York... in the City of New York in America... named King's College", with the charter submitted by New York's colonial governor, James De Lancey.
- November 28 – Denmark establishes the Renteskirverkontor, an office within the Chamber of Finance, to oversee the colonial affairs of the Danish West Indies (Dansk Vestindien). Peder Mariager, who had been a minor official of the Danish West Indies Company, becomes the first administrator. The colony, consisting of the islands of Saint Thomas, Saint John and Saint Croix later is purchased by the United States from Denmark and is now the U.S. Virgin Islands.
- November 29 – Karim Khan Zand, the King of Persia (now Iran) recaptures the city of Shiraz from Afghan warlord Azad Khan Afghan, who had taken control of much of central Iran since 1749.
- December 13 – Osman III succeeds his brother Mahmud I as Ottoman Emperor; he will rule until his death in 1757.
- December 26 – Massachusetts becomes the third colony (after Pennsylvania and Connecticut) to reject the Albany Plan for an inter-colonial union, voting 48 to 31 to postpone consideration of the union question indefinitely.

=== Date unknown ===
- Surveyor William Churton lays out what will become the seat of Orange County, North Carolina. The town is named Corbin Town for Francis Corbin, a member of the North Carolina governor's council. Corbin Town is renamed Childsburgh in 1759, and finally Hillsborough in 1766.
- St. Florian's Martyr Greek Catholic Church, Budapest is built.
- Marian apparition at Las Lajas in Colombia.

== Births ==
- January 15
  - Richard Martin, Irish founder of the Society for the Prevention of Cruelty to Animals (d. 1834)
  - Jacques Pierre Brissot, French politician (d. 1795)
- January 30 – John Lansing Jr., American statesman (disappeared 1829)
- February 2 – Charles Maurice de Talleyrand-Périgord, French politician (d. 1838)
- February 6 – Andrew Fuller, Particular Baptist Theologian and minister (d. 1815)
- February 17 – Nicolas Baudin, French explorer (d. 1803)
- March 4 – Benjamin Waterhouse, American physician, medical professor (smallpox vaccine pioneer) (d. 1846)
- March 17 – Madame Roland (Jeanne Marie Manon Philipon), French politician (d. 1793)
- March 23 – Baron Jurij Vega, Slovenian mathematician, physicist and artillery officer (d. 1802)
- April 6 – Frédéric-César de La Harpe, Swiss politician and revolutionary

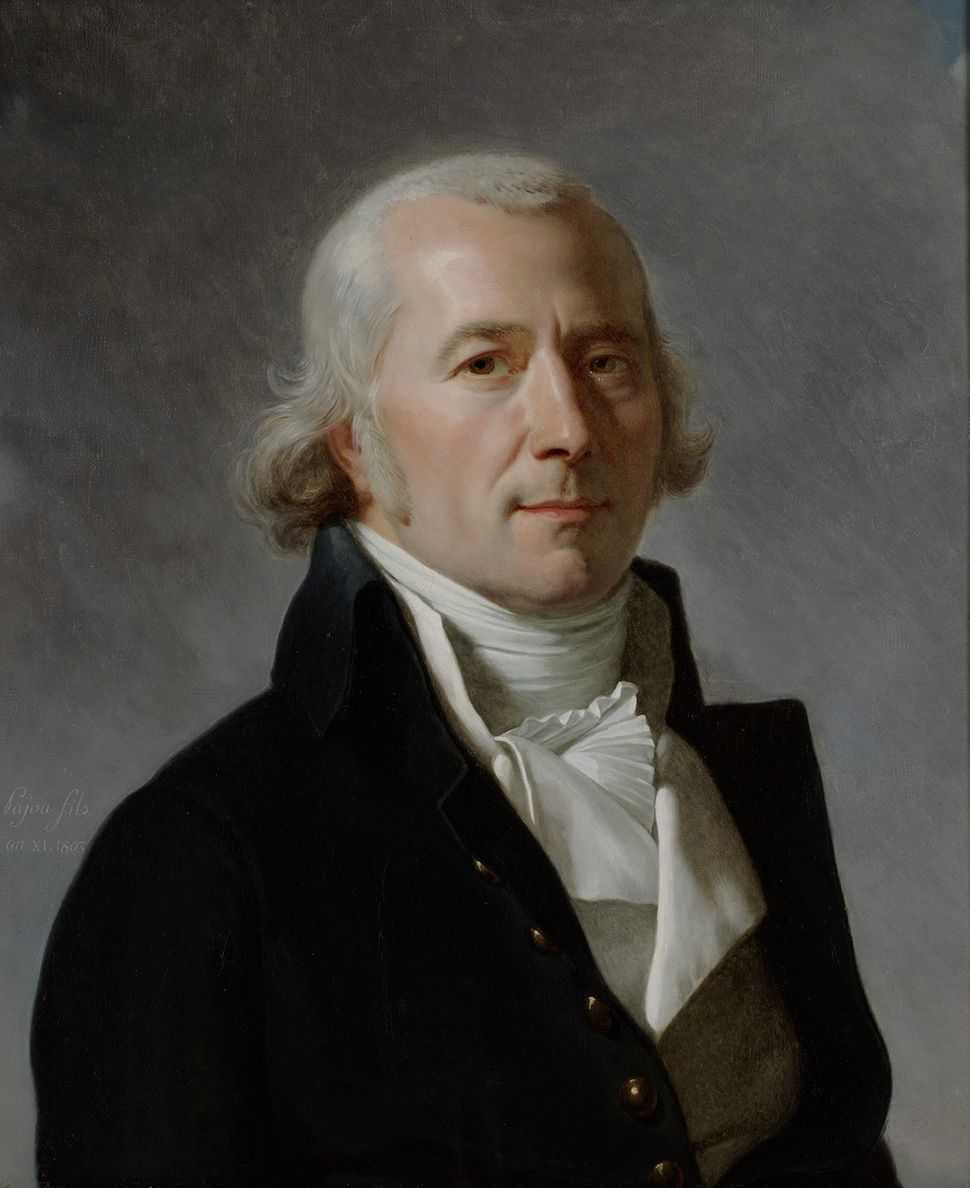
Frédéric-César de La Harpe

- May 23 – William Drennan, Irish physician, poet and radical politician (d. 1820)
- May 31 – Catherine-Dominique de Pérignon, Marshal of France (d. 1818)
- June 4 – Franz Xaver von Zach, German scientific editor and astronomer (d. 1832)
- June 18 – Anna Maria Lenngren, Swedish poet, feminist and cultural figure (d. 1817)
- July 11 – Thomas Bowdler, English physician (d. 1825)
- August 9 – Pierre Charles L'Enfant, French architect (d. 1825)
- August 18 – François, marquis de Chasseloup-Laubat, French general (d. 1833)
- August 21 – William Murdoch, Scottish inventor (d. 1839)

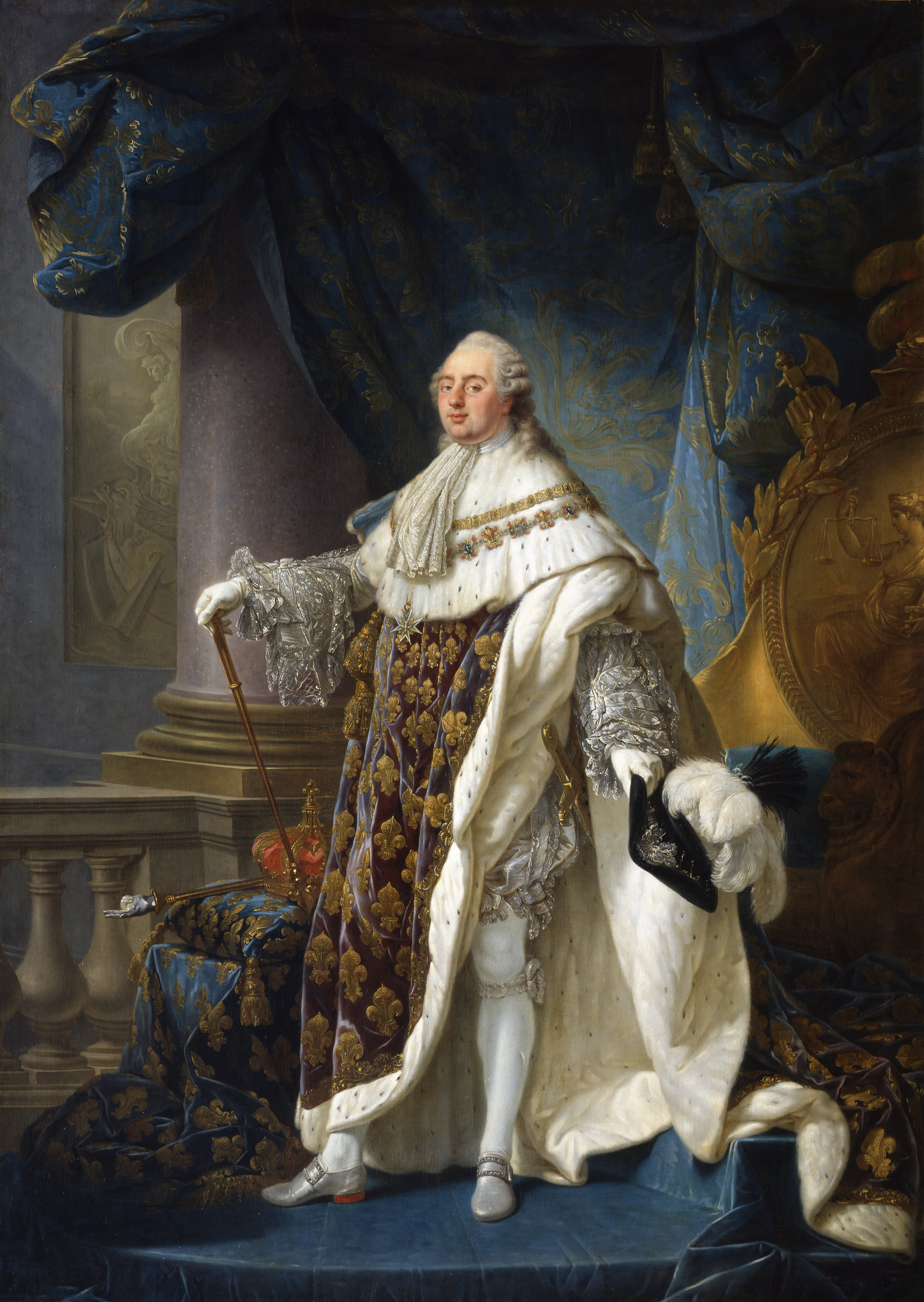
Louis XVI

- August 23 – Louis XVI, last king of France before the Revolution (d. 1793)
- September 9 – William Bligh, British sailor (d. 1817)
- September 20 – Emperor Paul I of Russia (d. 1801)
- September 26 – Joseph Proust, French chemist (d. 1826)
- October 9 – Jean-Baptiste Regnault, French painter (d. 1829)
- October 20 – James Hillhouse, American politician and congressman from Connecticut, 1791 until 1810 (d. 1832)
- October 28 – John Laurens, American soldier (d. 1782)
- November 19 – Pedro Romero, Spanish torero (d. 1839)
- December 7 – Jack Jouett, American politician (d. 1822)
- December 9 – Étienne Ozi, French composer (d. 1813)
- December 15 – Usman dan Fodio, Nigerian Islamic theologian (d. 1817)
- December 24 – George Crabbe, English poet (d. 1832)

=== Date unknown ===
- Eve Frank, Bulgarian religious leader (d. 1816)
- Richard Hancorne, British Royal Navy officer (d. 1792)

== Deaths ==
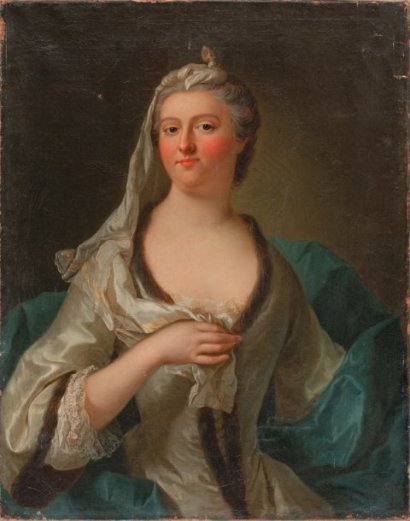
Marie Isabelle de Rohan, Duchess of Tallard died 5 January

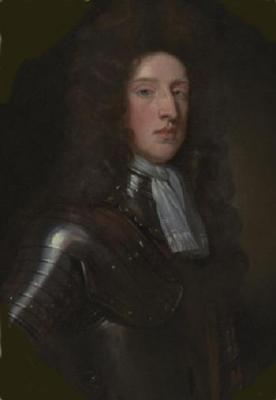
Lord Archibald Hamilton died 5 April

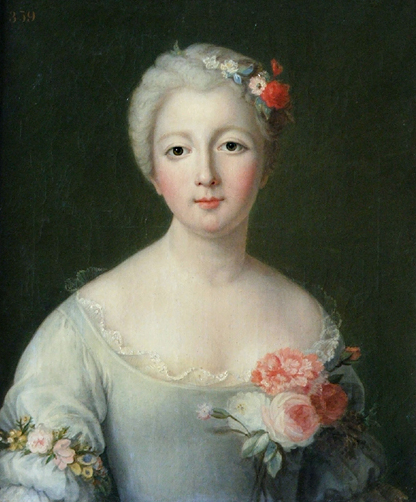
Maria Teresa Felicitas d'Este died 30 April

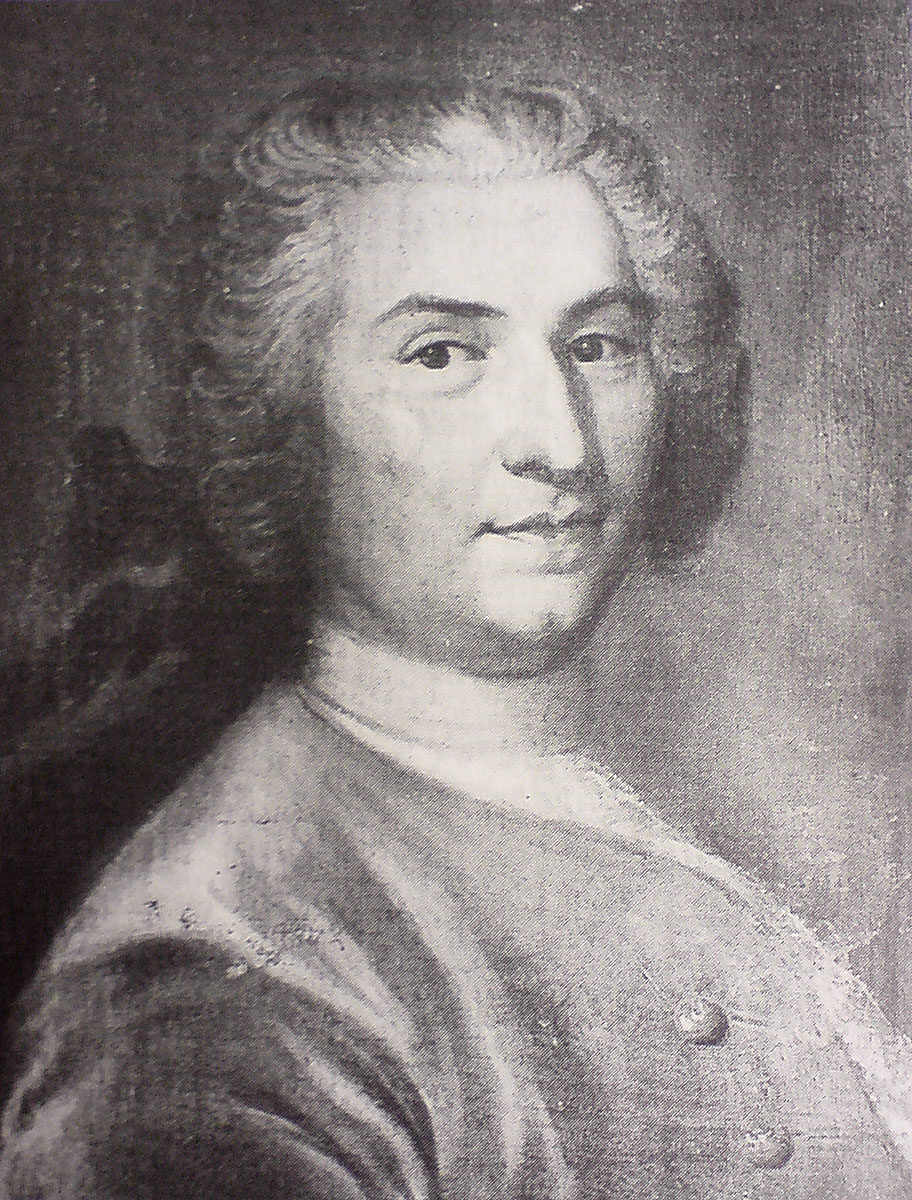
Carl Georg Siöblad died 1 September

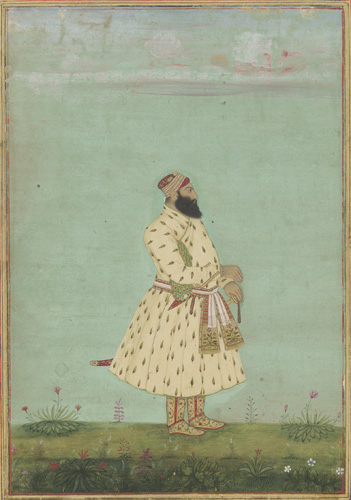
Safdar Jang died 5 October

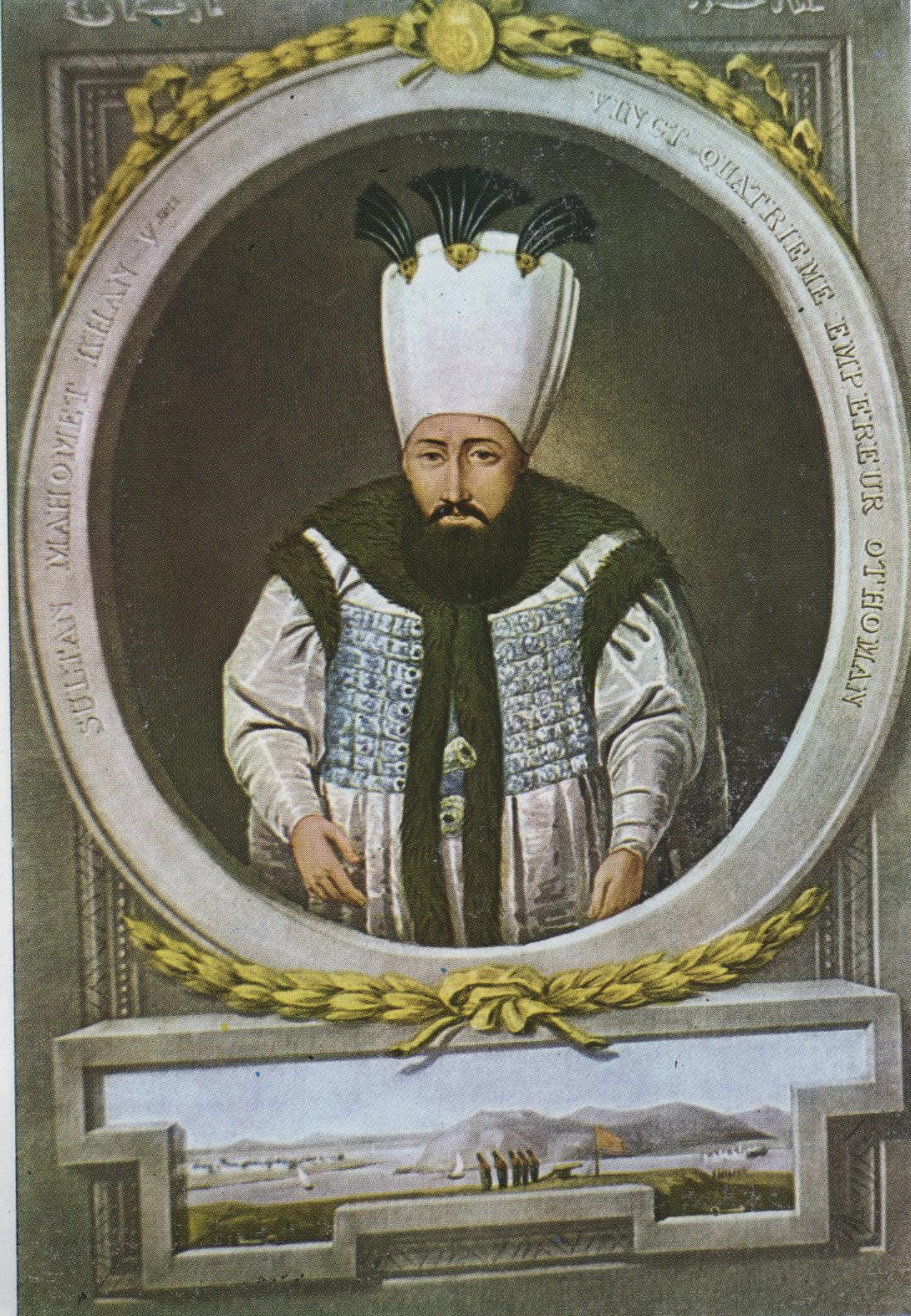
Mahmud I died 13 December

=== January–June ===
- January 5 – Marie Isabelle de Rohan, Duchess of Tallard, French noblewoman, granddaughter of Madame de Ventadour (b. 1699)
- January 10 – Edward Cave, English editor, publisher (b. 1691)
- January 16 – Edward Trelawny, British governor of Jamaica 1738–1752 (b. 1699)
- January 17 – Filippo Maria Monti, Cardinal in the Catholic Church (b. 1675)
- January 20 – Christian August, Duke of Schleswig-Holstein-Sonderburg-Augustenburg (b. 1696)
- January 28 – Ludvig Holberg, Norwegian dramatist and writer (b. 1684)
- February 2 – William Benson, English architect and self-serving Whig place-holder (b. 1682)
- February 5 – Caroline Thielo, Danish actress (b. 1735)
- February 16 – Richard Mead, English physician (b. 1673)
- February 22 – Xavier, Duke of Aquitaine, fils de France of the House of Bourbon (b. 1753)
- February 27 – Tomás de Almeida, first Patriarch of Lisbon (b. 1670)
- March 4 – Léopold Philippe d'Arenberg, 4th Duke of Arenberg (b. 1690)
- March 6 – Henry Pelham, Prime Minister of the United Kingdom (b. 1694)
- March 9 – Alexander Brodie, Scottish clan chief and politician (b. 1697)
- March 10 – Marc de Beauvau, Prince of Craon (b. 1679)
- March 22 – Samuel Bourn the Younger, English dissenting minister (b. 1689)
- March 23 – Johann Jakob Wettstein, Swiss theologian (b. 1693)
- March 31 – Hilario a Jesu Costa, Roman Catholic prelate, Apostolic Vicar of Eastern Tonking (1737–1754), Titular Bishop of Corycus (1735–1737) (b. 1696)
- April 2 – Thomas Carte, English historian (b. 1686)
- April 4 – Charles Guillaume Loys de Bochat, 18th-century Swiss jurist and antiquarian (b. 1695)
- April 5 – Lord Archibald Hamilton, Scottish officer of the Royal Navy (b. 1673)
- April 8 – José de Carvajal y Lancáster, Spanish statesman (b. 1698)
- April 9 – Christian Wolff, German philosopher, mathematician, scientist (b. 1679)
- April 15 – Jacopo Riccati, Italian mathematician (b. 1676)
- April 21 – Thomas Lawrence, merchant who was elected to six one-year terms as mayor of Philadelphia (b. 1689)
- April 27 – Marie Karoline von Fuchs-Mollard (b. 1681)
- April 30 – Maria Teresa Felicitas d'Este (b. 1726)
- May 14 – Pierre-Claude Nivelle de La Chaussée, French writer (b. 1692)
- May 18 – Sir John Strange, English politician (b. 1696)
- May 23 – John Wood, the Elder, English architect (b. 1704)
- June 2 – Ebenezer Erskine, Scottish religious dissenter (b. 1680)
- June 7 – Nicolai Eigtved, Danish architect (b. 1701)
- June 21 – Johann Baptist Martinelli, Austrian architect (b. 1701)
- June 28
  - Sollom Emlyn, Irish legal writer (b. 1697)
  - Martin Folkes, English antiquarian (b. 1690)

=== July–December ===
- July 4 – Philippe Néricault Destouches, French playwright who wrote 22 plays (b. 1680)
- July 14 – François Dominique de Barberie de Saint-Contest, French diplomat (b. 1701)
- August 2 – John Waller, American politician who served in the House of Burgess in 1714 (b. 1673)
- August 14 – Maria Anna of Austria, Archduchess of Austria and Queen consort of Portugal (b. 1683)
- August 26 – Charles Powlett, 3rd Duke of Bolton (b. 1685)
- September 1 – Carl Georg Siöblad, Swedish naval officer, Governor of Malmöhus County 1740–1754 (b. 1683)
- September 2 – Sir Tancred Robinson, 3rd Baronet, English Rear admiral and Lord Mayor of York (b. 1685)
- September 9 – Peter Mawney, member of one of the few French Huguenot families that remained in Rhode Island (b. 1689)
- October 4 – Tanacharison, Catawba Indian chief (b. c. 1700)
- October 5 – Safdar Jang (b. 1708)
- October 8 – Henry Fielding, English novelist and dramatist known for his earthy humour and satire (b. 1707)
- October 10 – Dorothea Krag, Danish General Postmaster and noble (b. 1675)
- October 13
  - Mahadhammaraza Dipadi, last king of Toungoo dynasty of Burma (Myanmar), 1733–1752 (b. 1714)
  - Hark Olufs, North Frisian sailor (b. 1708)
- October 28 – Friedrich von Hagedorn, German poet (b. 1708)
- November 20 – Robert Darwin of Elston, English lawyer and physician (b. 1682)
- November 24 – William Tutty, English-Canadian clergyman (b. 1715)
- November 27 – Abraham de Moivre, French mathematician (b. 1667)
- November 30 – Charles Willing, Philadelphia merchant (b. 1710)
- December 5 – Henry de Nassau d'Auverquerque, 1st Earl of Grantham (b. 1673)
- December 12 – Wu Jingzi, Chinese writer (b. 1701)
- December 13 – Mahmud I, Sultan of the Ottoman Empire from 1730 to 1754 (b. 1696)
- December 22 – Willem van Keppel, 2nd Earl of Albemarle (b. 1702)
- December 27 – Charles Craven, son of Sir William Craven and Margaret Clapham (b. 1682)
