= Mats Nyberg =

Mats Nyberg may refer to:

- Mats O. Nyberg, Swedish curler
- Mats Nyberg (sailor), Swedish sailor
