= Francisco Gómez de Santiago =

Spanish Catholic prelate (1887–1962)

His Excellency Francisco Gómez de Santiago OP
- Vicar Apostolic of Hải Phòng
- Metropolis: Hanoi
- Installed: 18 February 1933
- Term ended: 1952
- Predecessor: Alejandro García Fontcuberta, OP
- Successor: Joseph Trương Cao Đại, OP

Orders
- Ordination: 29 January 1911
- Consecration: 19 March 1933 by Victor Dreyer

Personal details
- Born: 20 September 1887 Mesegar de Corneja
- Died: 3 April 1962 (aged 74) Valladolid

Francisco Gómez de Santiago (20 September 1887 – 3 April 1962) was a Spanish Roman Catholic prelate of the Dominican Order. He was appointed coadjutor vicar apostolic of Hải Phòng and titular bishop of Dausara from 1932 to 1962. He succeeded on 18 February 1933 and was in charge until he resigned in 1952. He died in Valladolid on 3 April 1962 at the age of 74.

Catholic Church titles
Preceded by Alejandro García Fontcuberta, OP	Vicar Apostolic of Hải Phòng; 1933–1952	Succeeded by Joseph Trương Cao Ðại, OP
Preceded by Nicola Cicero	Titular Bishop of Dausara; 1932–1962	Succeeded by Henri Martin Mekkelholt
