= Hilario di Jesu Costa =

Most Reverend Hilario a Jesu Costa
- Apostolic Vicar of Eastern Tonking
- Church: Catholic Church
- Diocese: Apostolic Vicariate of Eastern Tonking
- In office: 1737–1754
- Predecessor: Thomas Bottaro
- Successor: Santiago Hernández
- Previous post: Titular Bishop of Corycus

Orders
- Consecration: 11 Nov 1736 by Thomas Bottaro

Personal details
- Born: 2 Sep 1696 Pessinetto, Italy
- Died: 31 Mar 1754 (age 57) Vietnam

Hilario a Jesu Costa, O.A.D. (1696–1754) was a Roman Catholic prelate who served as Apostolic Vicar of Eastern Tonking (1737–1754) and Titular Bishop of Corycus (1735–1737).

== Biography ==
Hilario a Jesu Costa was born in Pessinetto, Italy on 2 Sep 1696 and ordained a priest in the Ordo Augustiniensium Discalceatorum. On 3 Oct 1735, he was appointed during the papacy of Pope Clement XII as Coadjutor Apostolic Vicar of Eastern Tonking and Titular Bishop of Corycus. On 11 Nov 1736, he was consecrated bishop by Thomas Bottaro, Titular Bishop of Nyssa. On 3 Oct 1735, he succeeded to the bishopric. He served as Apostolic Vicar of Eastern Tonking until his death on 31 Mar 1754.

While bishop, he was the principal consecrator of Louis Néez, Apostolic Vicar of Western Tonking and Titular Bishop of Comana Armeniae (1739).

Catholic Church titles
| Preceded by | Titular Bishop of Corycus; 1735–1737 | Succeeded by |
| Preceded by Thomas Bottaro | Apostolic Vicar of Eastern Tonking | Succeeded by Santiago Hernández (bishop) |
