= Murad Ozdoev =

Ingush fighter pilot

Murad Akhmedovich Ozdoev
- Мурад Ахмедович Оздоев; Оздой Ахьмада Мурад
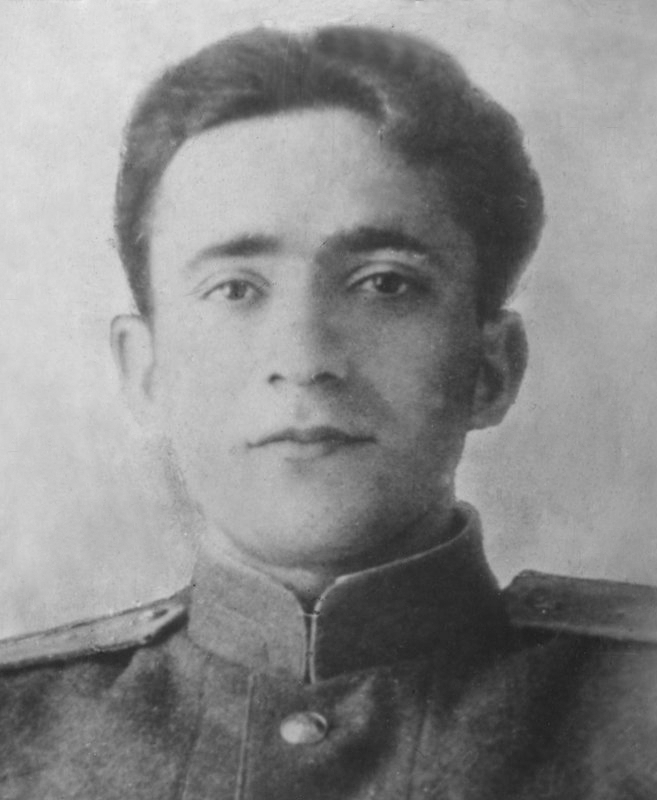
- Born: 10 March 1922; Nazran, Mountain ASSR, Russian SFSR
- Died: 25 February 1999 (aged 76); Nazran, Russian Federation
- Military career
- Allegiance: Soviet Union
- Branch: Soviet Air Force
- Service years: 1940 – 1946
- Rank: Junior Lieutenant
- Unit: 431st Fighter Aviation Regiment
- Conflicts: World War II
- Awards: Hero of the Russian Federation; Order of the Red Banner; Order of the Patriotic War; Order of the Red Star

Murad Akhmedovich Ozdoev (Note: Russian: Мурад Ахмедович Оздоев, Ingush: Оздой Ахьмада Мурад, romanized: Ozdoy Ah'mada Murad) (10 March 1922 – 25 February 1999) was an Ingush fighter pilot in the 431st Fighter Aviation Regiment during the Second World War and recipient of the title Hero of the Soviet Union. Presumed to have been killed in action after being shot down and forced to bail out in January 1944, he was taken prisoner by the Germans, and held as a POW until the prison camp where he was held was liberated by Allied forces on 8 May 1945. He then briefly lived in exile from Ingushetia before returning to Nazran, where he lived for the remainder of his life.

== Early life ==
Ozdoev was born in 1922 to an Ingush family in Nazran. After completing secondary school he studied at the Grozny aeroclub while working in local industries. After completing flight training in Grozny he joined the Red Army in 1940, upon which he underwent further training at the Armavir Military Aviation School before being deployed to the warfront of the Second World War as part of the 431st Fighter Aviation Regiment.

== World War II ==
Ozdoev totaled 69 combat sorties during which he gained three aerial victories, including a high-altitude Focke-Wulf Fw-189 which had been labeled by the Soviet Air Forces as a difficult target. Throughout the war he piloted Po-2, LaGG-3, Yak-1, Yak-7B and Yak-9 aircraft. During the Battle of Kursk, he shot down two Fw 190s in one sortie while escorting a group of Petlyakov Pe-2 dive bombers. In Autumn 1943 he provided air support in the Polotsk and Leningrad-Novgorod offensives. While escorting a group of bombers on 25 January 1945 his plane was hit by an anti-aircraft missile from the ground, and he was presumed dead by his comrades who saw him shot down. In reality he had actually survived, unbeknownst to his colleagues, but was severely wounded and had been captured by the Germans. After he was captured by the Germans he was sent to a prison camp in Lodz, Poland and later relocated to a different prison camp in the Czech Republic. Throughout his imprisonment he attempted to escape twice but was unsuccessful; after both attempts he was tortured and badly beaten. On 8 May 1945 Soviet forces took over the prison camp and in June he was allowed to return to his regiment. Upon return he was welcomed by his comrades who were shocked he had survived the war, but he was soon demobilized in 1946.

== Later life ==
In January 1946 Ozdoev was sent to the Akmola Region of the Kazakh SSR where the rest of his family had been deported. His parents had been forced out of Ingushetia just shortly after receiving a notice that their son was killed in action. Four years after the death of Stalin, Ozdoev returned to his hometown of Nazran, where he lived for the remainder of his life. On 8 May 1995 he was belatedly honored with the title Hero of the Russian Federation for his actions in the war. He died on 25 February 1999 at the age of 76.

He had a son, Kazbek, who is a cousin of Mustafa Ozdoev, the father of footballer Magomed Ozdoev.

== Awards ==
- Hero of the Russian Federation
- Order of the Red Banner
- Order of the Patriotic War 1st and 2nd class
- Order of the Red Star

== See also ==
- List of Heroes of the Russian Federation
