= Rose Mbowa =

Ugandan writer and actress

- Born: 18 January 1943; Uganda
- Died: 11 February 1999 (aged 56)
- Citizenship: Uganda
- Education: Makerere University (Bachelor of Arts in English Literature); University of Leeds (Master of Arts in Theatre Arts and Drama)
- Occupations: Academic and feminist
- Years active: 1972—99
- Known for: Academics and feminism
- Title: Former Professor at Makerere University

Rose Mbowa (18 January 1943 – 11 February 1999) was a Ugandan writer, actress, academic and feminist. She was a professor of Theatre Arts and Drama at Makerere University, the oldest and largest public university in Uganda.

== Background and education ==
Rose Mbowa was born on 18 January 1943 in the town of Kabale, in the Western Region of Uganda, to Eva Nyinabantu Mbowa, a homemaker, and Kasole Lwanda Mbowa, a laboratory technician. After attending local schools, she was admitted to Gayaza High School, a prestigious boarding school about 19 kilometres (12 mi), outside of Uganda's capital city, Kampala. Following high school at Gayaza, she went on to study English literature at Makerere University, Kampala. Whilst there, she was a member of the Makerere Free Travelling Theatre. In 1969 she was admitted to the University of Leeds, graduating with a Master of Arts (MA) degree in Drama & Theatre Arts.

== Theatre and professional work ==
As an actor and theatre-maker, Mbowa performer with a number of different theatre companies in Uganda. She was named best actress at the National Theatre and received the Presidential Meritorious Award for Acting in 1973. She also received the National Theatre Best Production award twice: for her own play Nalumansi in 1982 and for The Marriage of Anansewa by Efua Sutherland in 1983. She performed the title role in Bertolt Brecht's play Mother Courage and Her Children, in the first authorised production of any of his plays in an African language.

As a playwright, Mbowa's most important work was Mother Uganda and her Children. Commissioned by London's Africa Centre, it was first performed in 1987 and has since been performed internationally, its success signifying a growing local and international interest in and respect for East African theatre. It was created with Makerere students through a collaborative devising process, and is, according to theatre scholar Eckhard Breitinger, a highly political ‘play of conscientisation’ which ‘emphasises the richness of diverse ethnic cultural traditions, [...] encourages a self-confident practice of this wide variety of cultures, but [...] also warns against the abuses resulting from an only inward looking ethno-centricity and rigid traditionalism.' Her mentor was playwright Byron Kawadwa, who was killed by Idi Amin's forces in 1977.

She was also a key figure in the African Theatre for Development movement. In the 1980s, she worked with the rural Magere Women's Cooperative, and encouraged the women to use their culture and to market their agricultural produce. She also worked for a year as a producer at Radio Uganda.

== Academic career ==
Mbowa started as a lecturer in the Department of Music, Dance and Drama at Makerere University, before becoming a Professor and then Head of the department when the previous head was forced to leave the country. She published a number of articles on theatre in Uganda and presented papers on Ugandan theatre at the annual conference on African literature at the University of Bayreuth between 1989 and 1994.

== Legacy ==
In 2005, Bakayimbira Dramactors staged a play, Kiwajja, in celebration of Rose Mbowa's contribution to Uganda's theatre.
