= Joseph Marie Nguyễn Tùng Cương =

Vietnamese Roman Catholic prelate (1919–1999)

His Excellency Joseph Marie Nguyễn Tùng Cương
- Bishop of Hải Phòng
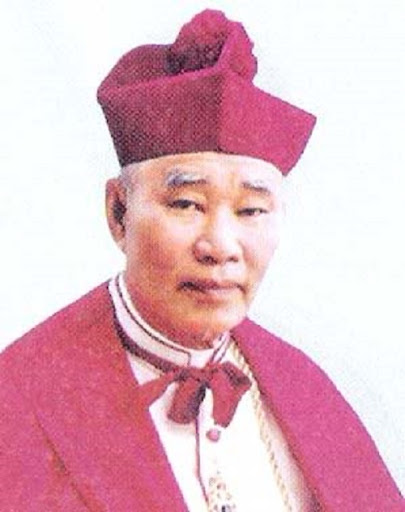
- Native name: Giuse Maria Nguyễn Tùng Cương
- Province: Hà Nội
- See: Hải Phòng
- Appointed: 10 January 1979
- Installed: 24 February 1979
- Term ended: 10 February 1999
- Predecessor: Pierre Marie Khuất Văn Tạo
- Successor: Joseph Vũ Văn Thiên

Orders
- Ordination: 3 December 1949 by Jean Marie Mazé MEP
- Consecration: 18 February 1979 by Joseph-Marie Trịnh Văn Căn

Personal details
- Born: 4 October 1919 Đông Nội
- Died: 10 February 1999 (aged 79) Hải Phòng, Việt Nam
- Motto: Duc in altum (Put out into the deep)

Joseph Marie Nguyễn Tùng Cương (4 October 1919 – 10 February 1999) was a Vietnamese Roman Catholic prelate. He was bishop of Hải Phòng from 1979 to 1999.

Catholic Church titles
Preceded by Pierre Marie Khuất Văn Tạo	Bishop of Hải Phòng; 1979–1999	Succeeded by Joseph Vũ Văn Thiên
