= St. Florian's Martyr Greek Catholic Church, Budapest =

Church in Budapest, Hungary

Coordinates: 47.511259°N 19.038316°E

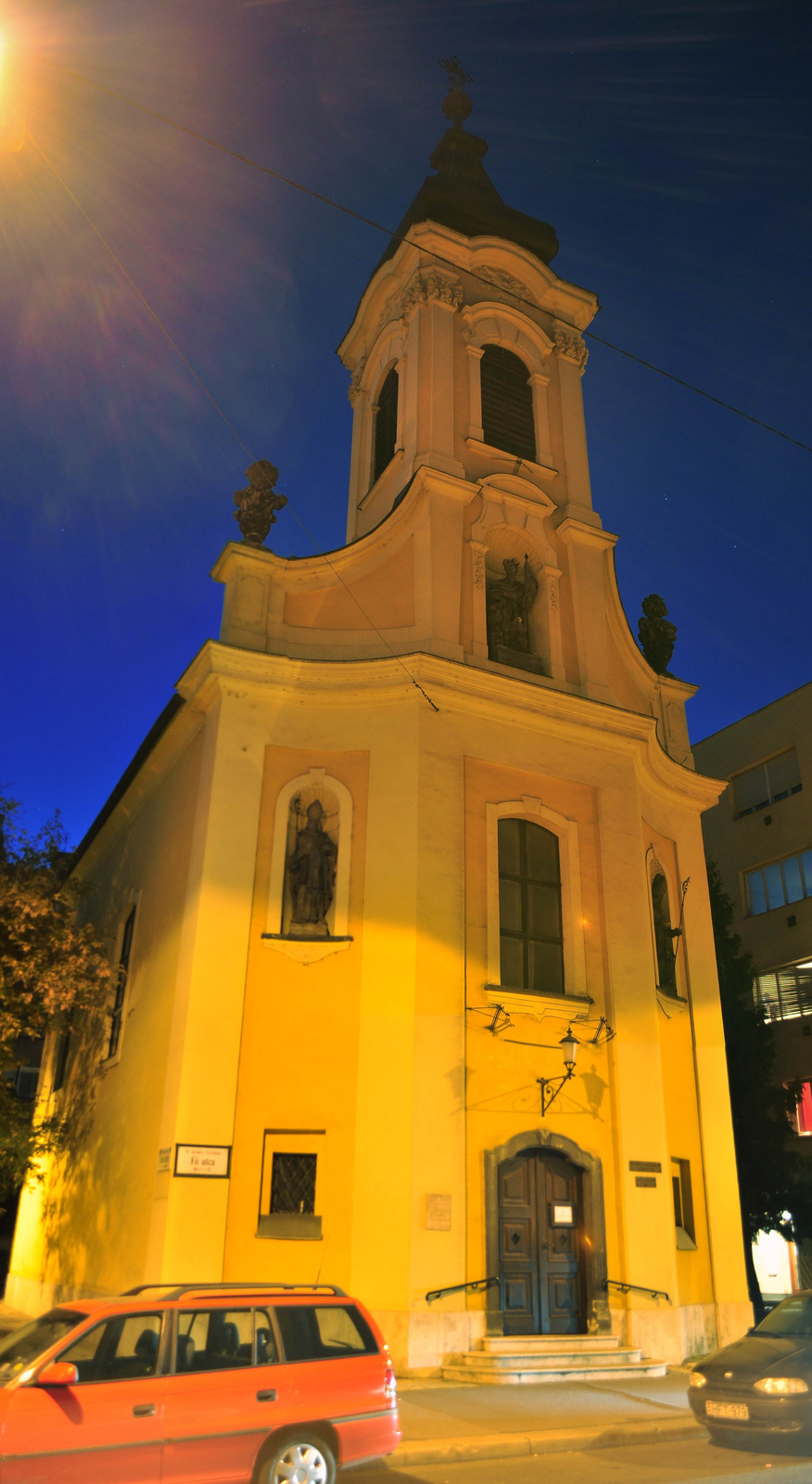

St. Florian's Martyr Greek Catholic Church is a historic church in Budapest, Hungary.

== History ==
The church at 88, Main Street, in Budapest II district, was built in 1754 and was significantly expanded in 1759-1760 according to the plans of Matthew Nepauer. The main altar picture of the church was handed over in 1770. The church was renovated in the 1920s, but its Baroque furnishings were removed (some of which are now housed in the nearby Kiscelli Museum). In 1937 it was elevated to almost one and a half meters higher due to the watering of the surrounding area during large-scale engineering work. In the 1980s and 1990s it was renovated inside and out.

== Sources ==
- https://www.szeretlekmagyarorszag.hu/miert-emeltek-meg-140-centivel-egy-budapesti-templomot/
