= Ara Harutyunyan =

Armenian monumental sculptor and graphic artist

Ara Harutyunyan Արա Հարությունյան
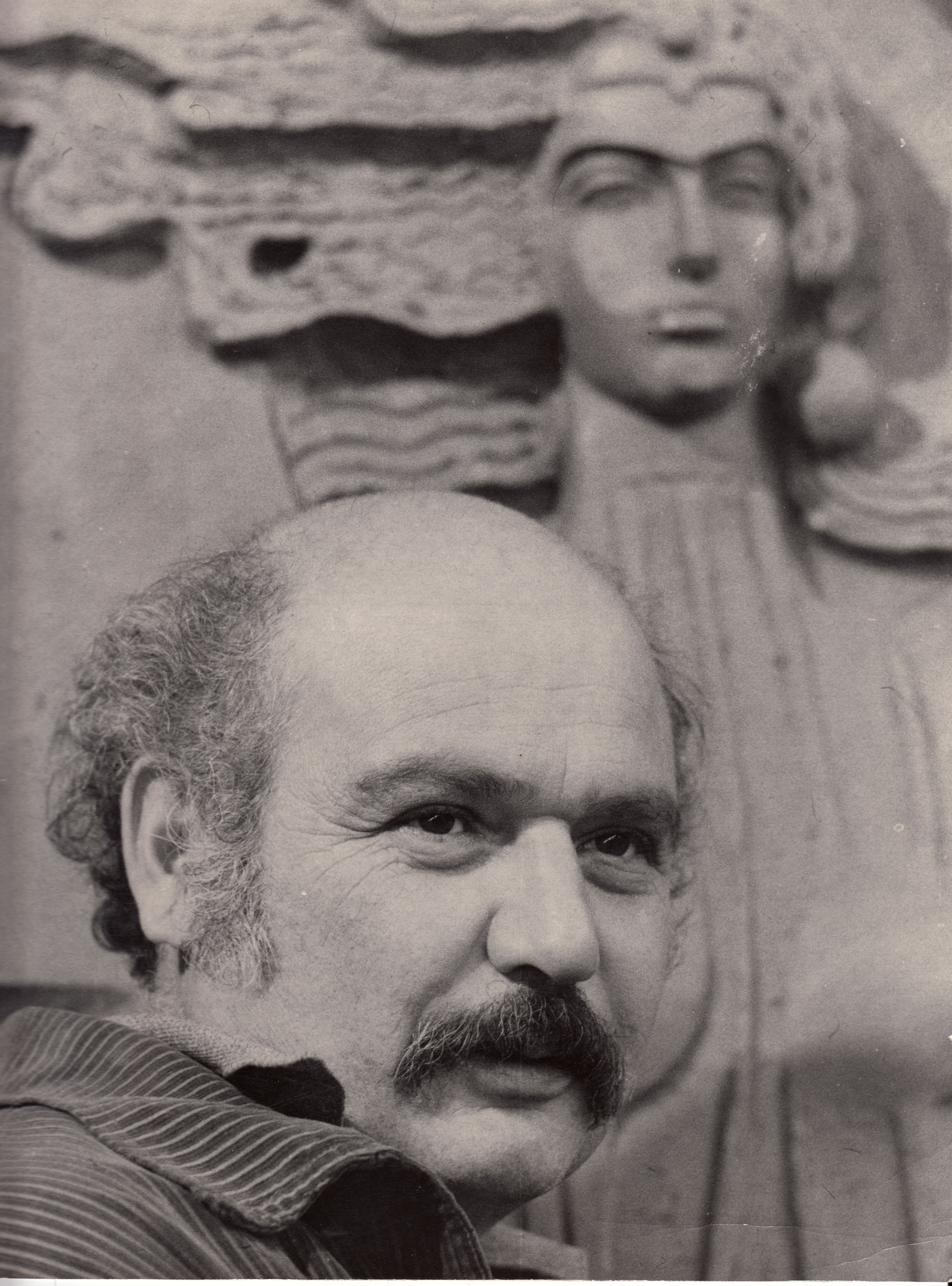
- Born: March 28, 1928; Yerevan, Armenia
- Died: February 28, 1999 (aged 70); Yerevan, Armenia
- Occupations: Artist, Sculptor

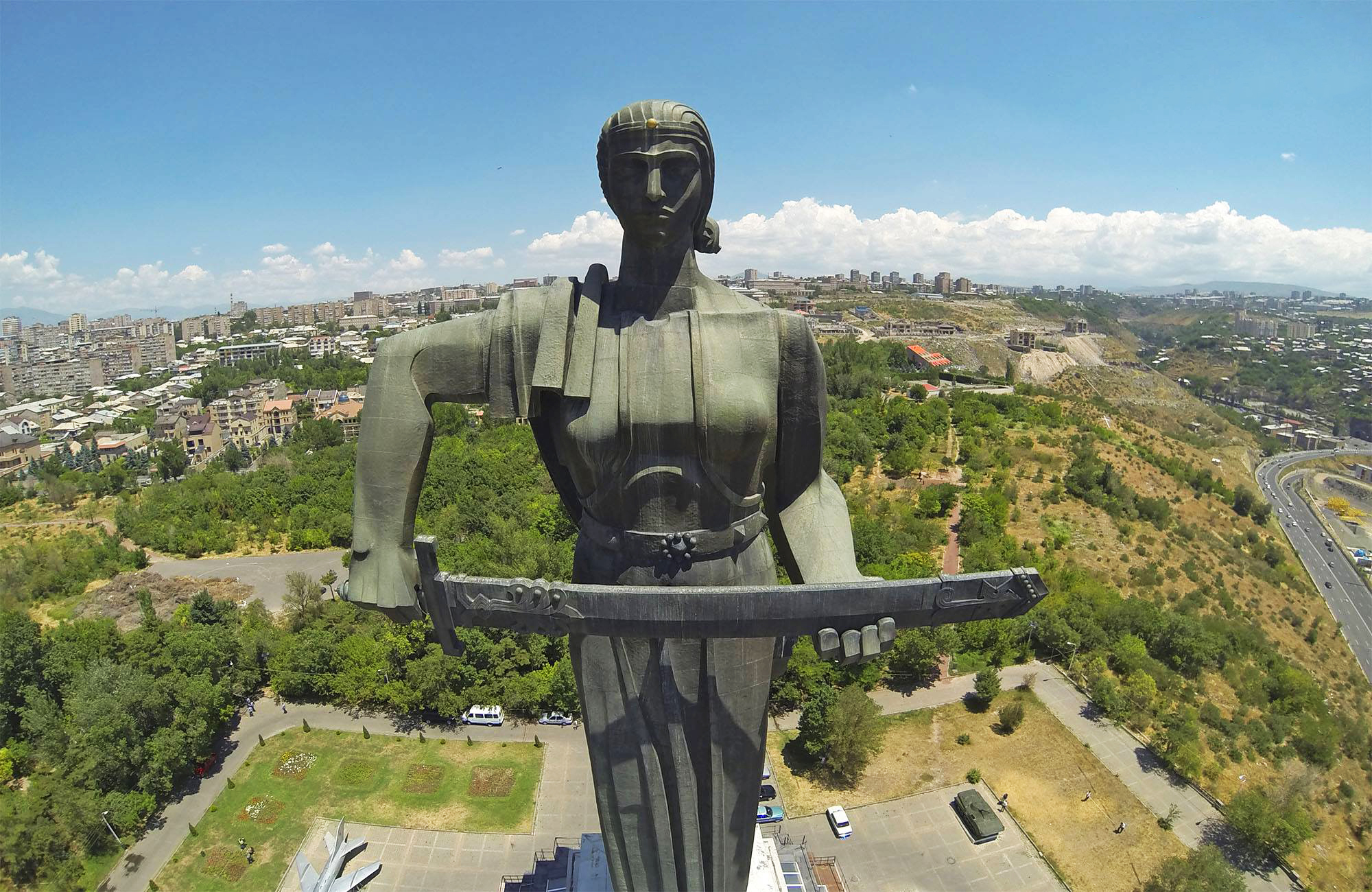
Harutyunyan's Mother Armenia statue

Ara Harutyunyan (Armenian: Արա Հարությունյան; March 28, 1928 – February 28, 1999) was an Armenian monument sculptor, graphic artist, People's Artist of Armenia, corresponding member of the Academy of Fine Arts of USSR and the Russian Academy of Arts, professor.

He is the creator of the Mother Armenia statue installed on the heights of Yerevan, which became one of the most popular symbols of Armenia. Harutyunyan revived the traditions of the medieval Armenian architectural and sculptural complex while combining his own vivid style of decorative narrative relief art. Among them are works such as the Erebuni Museum, the sculptural complex of the G. Sundukyan State Academic Theatre, the Sardarapat Memorial Complex and the Musa Ler monument, the reliefs of the Yerevan Vine Plant.

The sculptor's has a large number of well-known works. Harutyunyan created more than 40 monumental and monumental-decorative works, sculptural complexes in Armenia, Russia, France, Italy, Philippines and other countries, as well as reliefs, gravestones, easel sculptures, dozens of drawings and graphic works.

The art scholar A. Kamensky said: "Harutyunyan strongly influenced today's Yerevan. He created its central vertical, the grand "Mother Armenia" monumental statue. The bas-reliefs and decorative sculptures done by the master decorate the entrance of the G. Sundukyan Theatre, the Erebuni Museum, the Journalists' House and other buildings. Their architectural and sculptural composition in many ways determines the artistic and plastic expressivity of the modern Yerevan, the language of its symbols and historical associations".

== Childhood ==
Ara Harutyunyan was born on March 28, 1928, in Yerevan. His father was a musician who worked for the Armenian Philharmonics and the A. Spendiaryan opera and ballet Theatre, the artistic director and conductor of which was K. Saradjev. From his early childhood A. Harutyunyan demonstrated an interest in the arts and especially sculpture. As a child, he loved theatre and pictorial art, especially the works of M. Vrubel. Once, when he was still a boy, he found a piece of tuff and, using whatever tools he could find, hewed out a woman's head that looked like the Armenian goddess Anahit. This work received praise from the artist Taragros.

After finishing seventh grade (1943), Harutyunyan entered the Yerevan Art College after F. Terlemezyan. He was a student at the workshop of G. Aharonyan, who introduced his students to the history of European art. In 1948 two of Harutyunyan's student works were exhibited in the foyer of the Spendiaryan Theatre in Yerevan. In 1952 Harutyunyan received the prize of Ministry of Culture of the Armenian SSR for the project of the monument to Anani Shirakatsi.

== Early career ==
After graduating from the Art College, Harutyunyan entered the Yerevan Art and Theatre Institute and graduated from it in 1954. The sculptor's graduate work was the bronze statue of Komitas that won the competition and was installed on the composer's grave (Yerevan. Komitas Pantheon). As the art scholar A. Kamensky put it, "... this way, a great national honour was bestowed on Arutyunyan."

His early works included the bust monuments to V. Belinsky (1957), writer A. Shirvanzade (1958), gravestones for the People's Artist of the Armenian SSR A. Voskanyan (1958), artist E. Tatevosyan (1961), physician S. Sogomonyan (1962). A milestone for this period is the portrait of Ida Kar (1957), the famous English photographer of Armenian origin.

The Lioness (1958), installed by the road to the medieval monastery of Geghard, was one of the first decorative sculptures in Soviet Armenia.

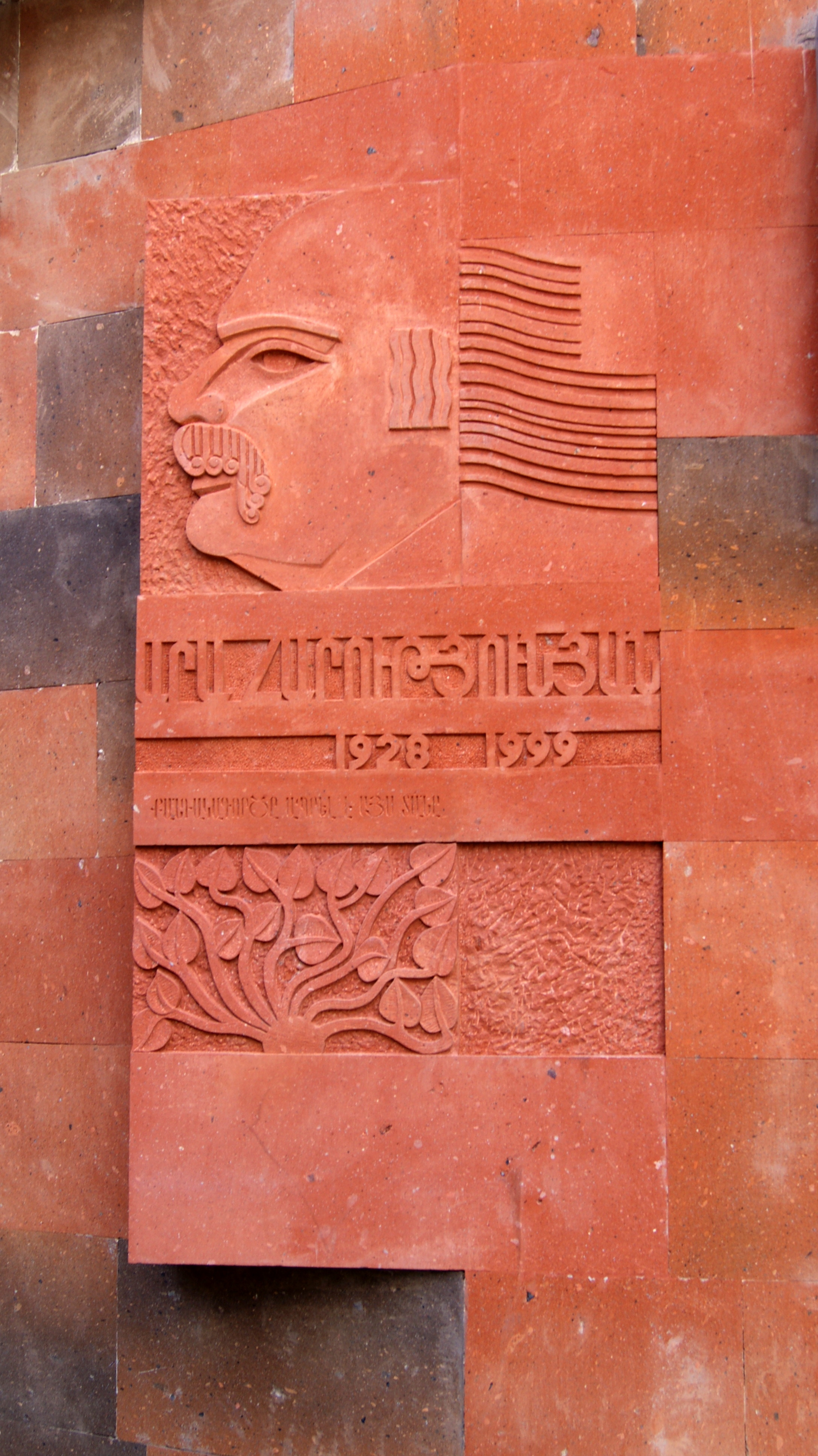
Harutyunyan's memorial plaque in Yerevan

== Adulthood ==
Since the 1960s, Harutyunyan entered a new and productive stage in his monumental sculpture work. During this period, he created the first sculptural complex in the Soviet Armenia. The art scholar S. Orlov, associate member of the Russian Academy of Arts, wrote: "Harutyunyan transformed the traditions of the ancient oriental monumental sculpture in an artistic and individual way. He created his own vivid and original style".

In 1968-1969 Harutyunyan worked on the Erebuni Museum project (the theme of the bas-reliefs of the main front is "King Argishti and the founders of the city", on the southern front "The Lion Hunt", and on the northern front "God Khaldi"). The sculptural decorations of the Museum are a figural story winding through time, depicting the time of the ancient state of Urartu.

In 1970 Harutyunyan was awarded the Diploma of the Union of Architects of the USSR for his reliefs of the Erebuni Museum. Between 1966 and 1976 he worked on his favourite project - the sculptural complex of the G. Sundukyan Armenian State Academic Theatre depicting almost 2,000 years of the history of the Armenian theatre.

The G. Sundukyan Theatre is one of the first large-scale structures in Soviet Armenia combining decorative sculpture and architecture. The complex consists of the main entrance of the theatre, the monument to the dramatist G. Sundukyan (1972) and the bas-relief Sirin (1976). The reliefs of the main entrance of the theatre includes a female figure that symbolizes victory and rebirth, the drama, comedy and wisdom masks, the sign of eternal movement and the lithe dancing figures. On the top right there is a depiction of king Artavasdes II who, in 53 BC, founded the first Armenian theatre in the city of Artashat. To the left in the circular layout is the monument to G. Sundukyan, the writer who founded the school of critical realism in Armenian literature and created the national Armenian theatre. The sculptural portrait of the dramatist is installed on a pedestal that looks like a theatre stage. The final detail of the complex is the "Sirin" bas-relief. The fairy-tale bird portrayed in warm ochre-coloured tuff looks like the images seen on the pages of medieval Armenian manuscripts.

Details of Armenian culture and history found their embodiment in the compositions Vahagn the Dragon Fighter (1965) and The Builder Eagle (1966) that flank the northern and southern entrances to Yerevan as well as in the reliefs of the Yerevan Vine Plant Foxes and Fighting the Lion (1961).

In 1960, together with architect V. Sarkisyan, Harutyunyan erected a monument to the heroes of Zangezur in the city of Goris.

In 1964, Harutyunyan was awarded a medal of the Academy of Arts of the USSR for Sayat-Nova spring-monument (1963). This work is considered to be one of the best examples of an architectural and sculptural micro ensemble in urban environment. The choice of snow-white marble as the material for the monument is deeply meaningful. It symbolizes the spiritual and poetic figure of Sayat-Nova. The head of the poet is made as a single piece, his face is elaborated with a chisel. The sculptural composition of the monument is connected to its architectural layout. The rectangular marble blocks form light openings through which we see sunlight falling onto the leaves of the trees. On the upper horizontal plate of the monument, there are reliefs of women's heads in traditional headgear. On the other side there is an image of two eagles symbolizing friendship between the peoples. In the lower right angle, a jet of water is running down a marble groove. The monument to the great Armenian poet Sayat-Nova was opened in Yerevan in 1963, during the celebration of the poet's 250th anniversary. This opening was especially festive; it was attended by the leaders of Armenia and by significant figures representing Armenian art and culture. People read Sayat-Nova's poems aloud, the opening ceremony was accompanied by choral singing.

In 1963 Harutyunyan created the statue called Dawn (Sunrise). The figure of a girl made from hammered aluminum was installed by the Yerevan-Sevan highway. The British photographer Norman Parkinson, who came to Armenia together with his creative team, took a photo of the monument with the model Gerry Hall, and it was published in Vogue UK magazine in 1975 as one of the artist's best works.

In 1967, Harutyunyan implemented one of his main monumental projects, the Mother Armenia monumental statue that was installed in the Victory Park in Yerevan. It is the largest monument in Armenia: its height together with the pedestal is 54 m, the height of the statue itself, made from hammered copper, is 22 m, and it weighs 22 tons. The distinctive characteristics of the figure – stylized shape of the hands, severe outlines of the clothing, the right hand bent precisely at a straight angle – are, according to Harutyunyan's idea, symbols of the power and strength of this protector figure, the might and magnitude of the Motherland. The monument seems to be a single monolith. The task before the sculptor was all the more complicated since the statue was being created for the already existing pedestal where a monument to Stalin used to stand. This once more demonstrated the professional competence and mastery of Harutyunyan. The outstanding historian A. Z. Manfred, whose works on the history of France were a significant contribution to the study of history, visited Armenia in 1968. In his introduction to the book Napoleon Bonaparte (published in Armenian in 1975) Manfred talks with evident admiration about his impressions of the Mother Armenia monument that "amazes by its impact and artistic significance".

The way the monument became a focus of the architecture of Yerevan city and played a city-forming role was noted by the well-known art scholar A. Kamensky.

Harutyunyan talked about the process of creating the Mother Armenia monument in his interview with the Sovetakan Arvest newspaper. He said that according to his idea the Mother Armenia monument was to become the embodiment of courage, heroism and victory.

In 1968, Harutyunyan created (together with the architect R. Israelyan and the sculptors S. Manasyan and A. Shahinyan), a grand architectural and sculptural complex dedicated to the heroes of the Sardarapat Battle and located 10 km from the city of Armavir, right where in 1918 the Armenians won over the Turkish army. The composition includes the figures of winged oxen, an alley of eagles leading to the Victory wall, the buildings of the refectory and the Ethnography Museum of Armenia.

V. Tseltner says: "Harutyunyan's monumental sculpture, which embodied with incomparable force his favourite heroic theme, keeps moving ahead... His winged horses and the eagle on the Victory wall in the Sardarapat Battle complex are almost heraldic." "The main role in the sculptural composition of the complex belongs to the Victory Wall. The whole nature of its statuary, its figurative language, the principles of construction of the bas-relief compositions demonstrate connection with the previous works by Ara Arutyunyan," notes the art scholar B. Zurabov.

In 1969, the Sardarapat Memorial complex was nominated for the State Prize of the USSR.

In 1976, the Musa Ler memorial by Harutyunyan was erected on a hill near the Musa Ler village in the Armavir region of Armenia commemorating the fight of inhabitants of Armenian villages at the foot of Mount Musa Dag against the Turkish army in 1915. The monument is configured to look like a fortress and there is an image of an eagle on it. The front wall of the construction made from tuff is decorated with bas-reliefs of a warrior and a silhouette of a ship in memory of a French ship that saved the Armenian families that came out of the fortress of death. The documentary Sculptor Ara Harutyunyan includes some rare filming of the sculptor working on the monument.

Harutyunyan paid his respects to the Austrian writer Franz Werfel who wrote Forty Days of Musa Dag, the novel describing these historical events. He donated the sculpture portrait of the writer to the Musa Ler memorial. In 1978 he created the decorative sculpture The Muse from hammered copper. It graces the Journalist House in Yerevan, where the sculptor lived for 25 years.

In 1982, the sculptor brought to life, as the art scholar V. Tseltner put it, "the heroic image he found most attractive", the cast iron monument Glory to Labour ("Workman") installed in Labour Square in a factory district of Yerevan. The strength of human spirit was embodied in the figure of the workman, powerful and dynamic in its forward-directed movement. The monument to the workman was barbarously demolished in 1997. The fragments of the destroyed monument still have not been found.

The figure of genius composer Komitas serves as a leitmotif of all works of Harutyunyan. Throughout his life in art, the sculptor created many sculptures and graphic works on that theme. In 1988 Harutyunyan made his dream come true by erecting a monument to Komitas in the park of the Yerevan State Conservatory after Komitas. He spoke about this creative idea in his interview to the Yerekoyan Yerevan newspaper in 1977. The sculptor said: "Komitas for me is the unreachable peak, the epitome of holiness...", "Komitas is always with us, among us."

His legacy includes many sculptures. He created a whole gallery of sculpture portraits of the most famous figures from the Armenian history and culture: writer H. Tumanyan, composer Komitas, director V. Adjemyan, singer L. Zakaryan, People's Artists of the USSR M. Mkrtchyan and S. Sarkisyan, hero of the Soviet Union test pilot R. Kaprielyan, as well as the portrait of the Palestinian sculptor Muna Saudi and several generalized and allegoric images: Fall of Ani ("The Last Sigh"), The Call, The Winner, The Country of Nairi, and Hope.

Harutyunyan was a graphic artist who created drawings that presented, as the art scholar Vladimir Tseltner put it, "a surprisingly significant and varied separate part of the creative work of the sculptor so devoted to his main profession".

His personal exhibitions were held with great success in Moscow, Yerevan and many other cities, and beside sculptures they always included drawings and graphic works such as Theatre, Prayer, and Portrait of an actress, etc. The linear ink drawings are especially masterful, such as Dance, Nude, and A lady and satyrs. The art scholar S. Kaplanova says: "Harutyunyan's drawings are akin to works by Boticelli and Giorgione in purity and chastity of artist’s view of female body."

From 1974 to 1999, the sculptor was a professor at the Yerevan State Academy of Fine Arts. His students shared their memories of their teacher in the article "Master Ara Harutyunyan as seen by his students."

The artistic significance and value of the artistic legacy of Harutyunyan was noted by leading art scholars including A. Kamensky, V. Tseltner, G. Knabe, R. Abolina, I. Ivanova, A. Strigalev, S. Kaplanova, B. Zurabov, M. Ayvazyan, and S. Orlov.

== Main works ==
- 1955. The bronze monument to Komitas installed on the composer's grave. Pantheon. Yerevan
- 1958. Lioness of Geghard. The image of the decorative sculpture Lioness in Geghard is currently used in the design of the famous Armenian cognac brand Great Valley.
- 1960. Monument of professor R. Yeolyan. Goris. Armenia
- 1961. Obelisk in honor of the soldiers of the 89th Taman Division perished in the Great Patriotic War for the liberation of Sevastopol.
- 1961. North facade of Yerevan wine plant. Bas-reliefs. Fight with the lion and Foxes
- 1963. Dawn. The figure is made of aluminum chasing. Installed on the highway Yerevan-Sevan
- 1963. The monument to Sayat Nova is one of the most famous works by Harutyunyan. The monumental drinking fountain is represented by a wall of white marble blocks, with gaps between them. The head of ashug is as if stepping out of it. One the opposite side there is a relief depicting women of three Transcaucasian nations. Yerevan.
- 1964. Monumental drinking fountain Friendship between Yerevan and Carrara. Installed in Yerevan and Carrara (Italy)
- 1964. Monumental drinking fountain Friendship between Armenia and Estonia. Qanaker. Armenia
- 1965. Monumental drinking-fountain to the victims of Armenian Genocide of 1915. Yerevan.
- 1965. Vahagn the Wishup Fighter. Northern entrance to the city of Yerevan
- 1966. Builder-eagle. Southern entrance to the city of Yerevan
- In 1966 Harutyunyan accomplished the portal of Armenian Academic Drama Theatre. The height of portal is 5 meters. From the left side there is a figure of a woman embodying renaissance; above the portal are masks symbolizing drama, comedy, wisdom, the sign of eternal motion, airy female dancing figures and a head of a woman in the national attire. On the right is the head of the king Artavazd II, who created the first Armenian theatre in the city of Ashtarak in 53 BC. In 1976 Harutyunyan finishes working on the sculptural ensemble of the Armenian Academic Theatre named after G. Sundukyan. Monument to G. Sundukyan (1972). Sirin. Basrelief (1976) Yerevan.
- 1966. Fight of Vahagn with a dragon. Entrance to the city of Kaphan, Armenia
- In 1967-1968 Harutyunyan creates the sculpture Mother Armenia installed in Yerevan in Victory Park. It is the largest monument in Armenia.
- In 1968 Ara Harutyunyan created the grandiose architectural and sculptural complex, dedicated to the heroes of Sardarapat, located 25 kilometers far from Echmiadzin, in the place where the victory was won by Armenians over the Turkish army. Armenia. (together with the architect R. Israelyan and sculptors S. Manasyan and A. Shahinyan)
- 1968–1969. Erebuni Museum (Main facade - Argishty and the founders of the city. Southern facade – Lion hunting, Northern facade – God Haldi.) Yerevan.
- 1969 The architectural sculpture Battle of Sardarapat was nominated for the USSR State Prize.
- 1969 Monument to the poet H. Hakopyan. Installed in front of the Cultural Center named after S.Kirov. Yerevan
- 1974 Fertility. Decorative sculpture. Installed in Kishinev in Friendship Park
- 1975 Monument to the heroes of Musa Ler. Installed in the village Musa Ler of Echmiadzin. Armenia
- 1977 Awarded the title of People's Artist of the Armenian SSR. Elected as member of the Union of Artists of the USSR
- 1977–1978. Creative visit to France due to working on the creation of the monument to Misak Manouchian. Installed in Paris suburb of Ivry-sur-Seine.
- 1978 Muse. Decorative sculpture. House of Journalists, Yerevan
- 1978 Monument to S. Shaumyan, Stepanavan, Armenia
- 1979 Sculptural decoration of the facade of the Cultural Center in Razdan, Armenia.
- 1982 Personal exhibition in Yerevan.
- 1982 Monument to workers Glory to Labor Yerevan. Dismantled in 1997
- 1982 Monument-bust to the poet H. Tumanyan. Installed in Batumi
- 1983 Personal exhibition in the Central House of Artists. KrymskiyVal. Moscow
- 1986 Was published the monography "Ara Arutyunyan", series "Masters of Soviet art", Moscow. Author B. Zurabov
- 1988 Monument to the composer Komitas, installed in the park of the Yerevan State Conservatory
- 1989 Sculptural decoration of the children music school after Zare Saakyants in the city of Abovyan. Armenia
- 1995 Personal exhibition in the halls of the Academy of Arts of the USSR, Russian Federation. Moscow

== Indoor sculptures ==
- Portrait of a student. 1954. Bronze. Museum of Fine Arts. Kirovakan
- Komitas. 1954. Marble. 54х47х30. National Gallery of Armenia. Yerevan
- Poet H. Hakopyan. 1956. Marble. 56х100х50. Museum of M Abegyan. Yerevan
- Youth.Terracotta 1962.123х60х40. National Gallery of Armenia. Yerevan
- Youth. Colored gypsum.121х57х35. National Gallery of Armenia. Yerevan
- Portrait of a People's architect of the USSR R. Israyelyan. 1970. Tufa. Museum of Fine Arts. Kirovakan
- Country of Nairi. Figure. 1970. Bronze. 55x54x44. State Tretyakov Gallery. Moscow
- Fertility. Bronze. 1970. Museum of Fine Arts. Kirovakan
- Komitas. Head. 1972. Marble. 67×30×35 House of Choral Society. Lobby. Yerevan
- Komitas. Figure. 1972. Bronze. House of Choral Society. Yerevan
- Komitas. Full-length figure. Bronze. Tuf. 1972.63×16×13. State Tretyakov Gallery. Moscow
- Gabriel Sundukyan. Head. Bronze. 1972. Russian Dramatic Theatre after Stanislavskiy. Lobby. Yerevan
- Portrait of the producer V. Adjemyan. 1974. Bronze. 34х25х30. National Gallery of Armenia. Yerevan
- Portrait of R. Kaprielyan, Test pilot and the Hero of the Soviet Union and test pilot. Bronze 1975. 52×33×55. Fund of the International Confederation of Unions of Artists. Moscow
- Ripsime. Figure. Bronze. 1976. 33х18х8
- Frantz Werphel. Head. 1976. Gypsum. Museum of the architectural complex of Musa Ler. Echmiadzin district
- Plea (Prayer) Bronze and stone. 58х25х25. Fund of the International Confederation of Unions of Artists. Moscow
- Thinker. Figure. 1978. Bronze, artificial stone. 68х28х48. State Tretyakov Gallery. Moscow
- Winner. 1978. Bronze. 74х39х16. National Gallery of Armenia. Yerevan
- Collapse of Ani. 1978. Bronze. 25х46х22. State Tretyakov Gallery. Moscow
- Portrait of the daughter Susanna. Marble. 1978. 45, 5x32x48, 5. Fund of the International Confederation of Unions of Artists. Moscow
- Call. Bronze. 1978. 55х74х30. State Tretyakov Gallery. Moscow
- Portrait of People's artist of the Armenian SSR F. Mkrtchyan. 1979. Bronze. 38х29х32. State Tretyakov Gallery. Moscow
- Portrait of the Doctor K. Karagulyan. 1980. Bronze. 36x33x30
- Portrait of H. Liloyan. 1980. Bronze. 36x21x30
- Portrait of L. Nersesyan. 1980. Bronze. 35х25х30.
- Portrait of the singer L. Zaqaryan. 1980. Marble. 41х50х30
- Winegrower. 1980. Bronze. 37,5х15х19. National Gallery of Armenia. Yerevan
- Portrait of Ruzan. 1980. Terracotta 33х23х23
- Portrait of the Palestinian sculptor Muna Saudi. 1982. Bronze. 48x29x32. Fund of the International Confederation of Unions of Artists. Moscow
- Portrait of People's Artist of the Armenian SSR Sos Sargsyan. 1982. Bronze. 36х25х29.
- Fertility. Bronze. 1983. 64х28х28. Museum of Fine Arts. Kirovakan
- Hope. Bronze. 1984. 93х38х28.
- Portrait of Academician G. Brutyan. 1984. Marble. 40х58х29
- Komitas. Bronze. 26х25х28. Museum of Komitas. Yerevan
- Kara-Murza. Gypsum. 45х160х40. National Gallery of Armenia. Yerevan
- Hatsagorts Adalyan. Colored gypsum. 50х50х30. Union of Artists. Armenia
- Mesrop Mashtots. Gypsum. 109х55х25. Resort and spa management. Yerevan
- Architect Trdat. Bronze. 79х24,5х34. Fund of the International Confederation of Unions of Artists. Moscow
- Portrait of the President of Philippines Corazon Aquino. 1988. Bronze. Installed in the Malacanang Palace, Manila, Philippines.

== Awards ==
- 1952 received the prize of Ministry of Culture of the Armenian SSR for the project of the monument to Anani Shirakatsi
- 1955 became a member of the Artists' Union of Armenia SSR and USSR
- 1955-1966 taught at the Yerevan Art College after F. Terlemezyan
- 1959 participated in a cruise around the Europe as a member of Soviet artists delegation
- 1964 was awarded a medal of the Academy of Arts of the USSR for the spring monument "Sayat- Nova" in Yerevan; was awarded a title of Honored Artist of the Armenian SSR
- 1964 was elected as a member of the Council of the Artists’ Union Armenian SSR
- 1965 participated in the 4th International exhibition of sculptures in Carrara, Italy
- 1970 was awarded the Diploma of the Union of Architects of the USSR for reliefs of the Erebuni Museum
- 1972 was awarded the title of Honored Worker of Arts of the Armenian SSR; had a creative journey to Italy as a member of USSR Academy of Arts delegation
- 1974 had a creative journey to UK as the head of the USSR c Artists delegation
- 1974-1999 taught at the Yerevan State Academy of Fine Arts
- 1977 was awarded the title People's Artist of Armenia; was elected as Board member of the Union Artists of the USSR
- 1977-1978 had a visit to France due to working on the creation of the monument to Missak Manouchian and participating in the opening ceremony
- 1988 was elected as a corresponding member of the Academy of Arts of the USSR; became a professor
- 1988 had a creative journey to Malaysia, Singapore, Philippines; was awarded the Order of Friendship of Peoples.

== Figures ==
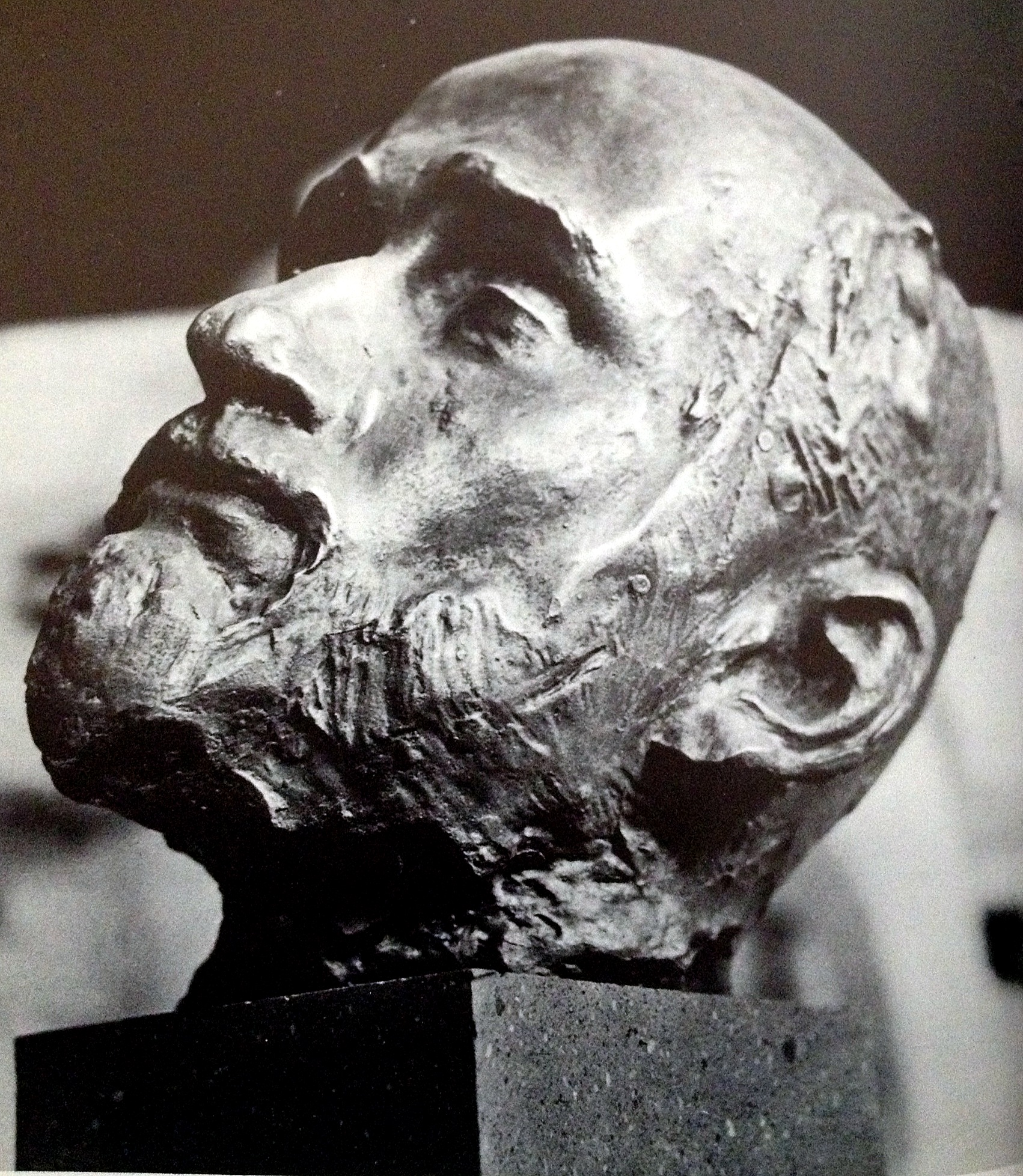
Komitas

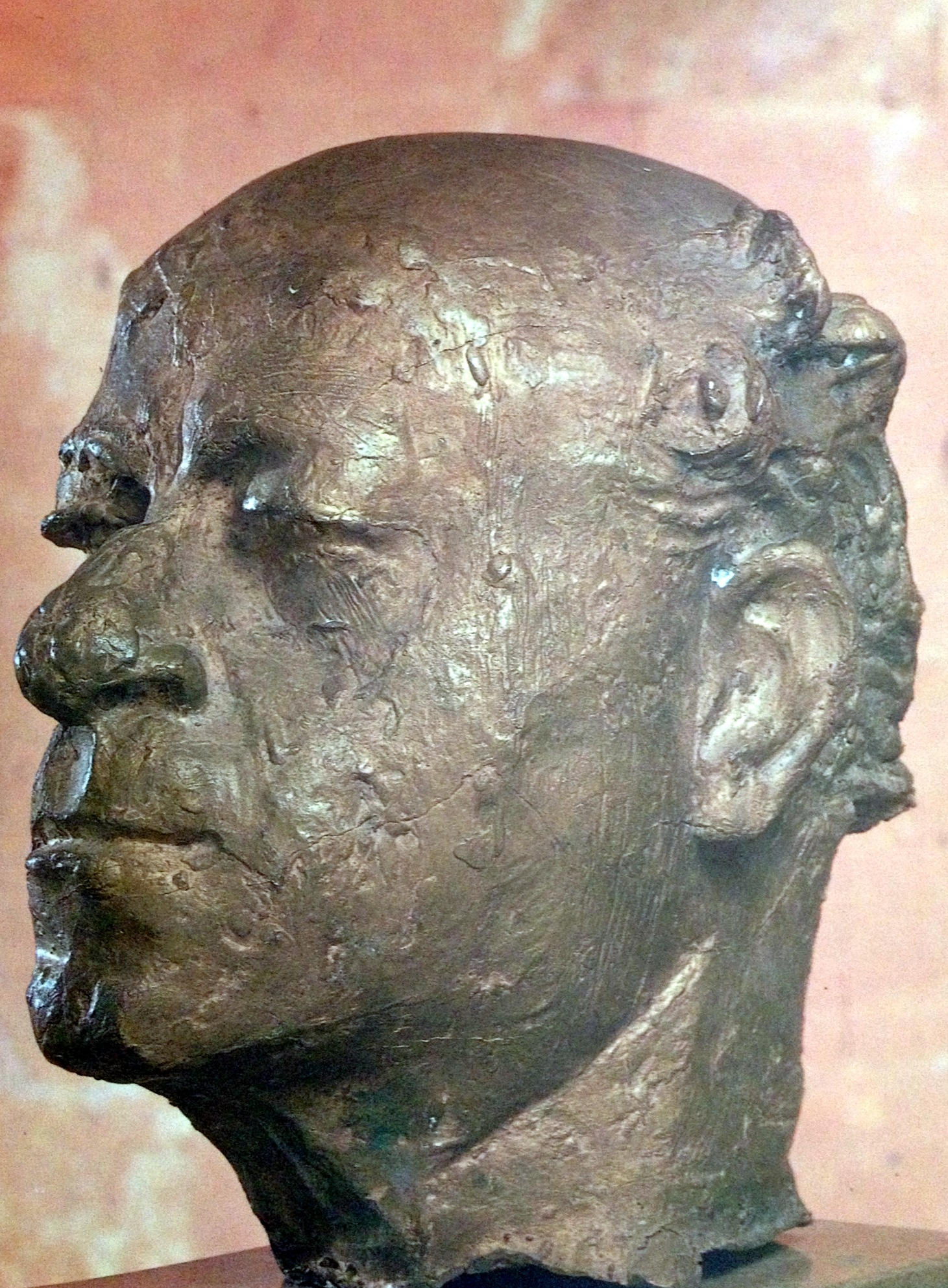
Vardan Achemian

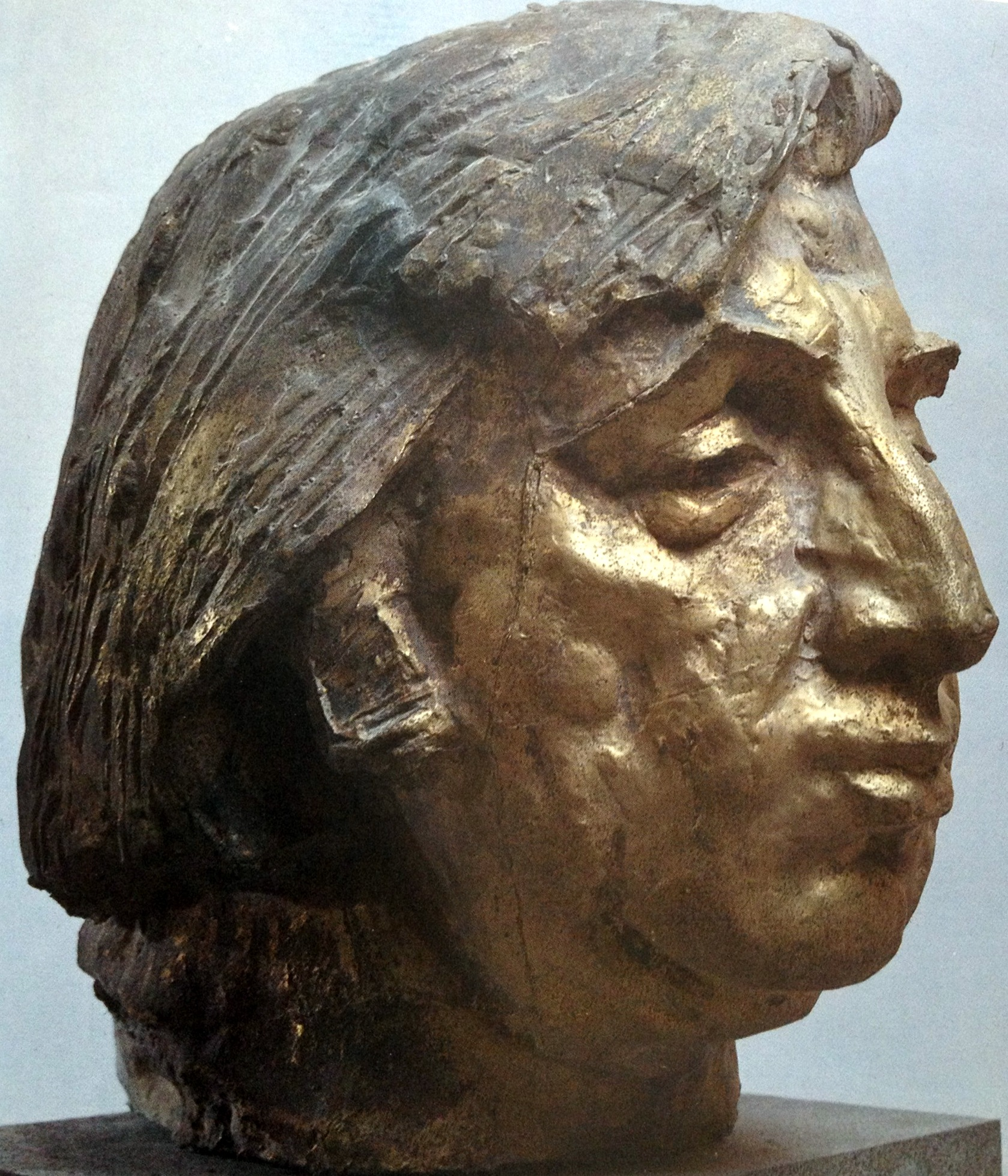
Mher Mkrtchyan

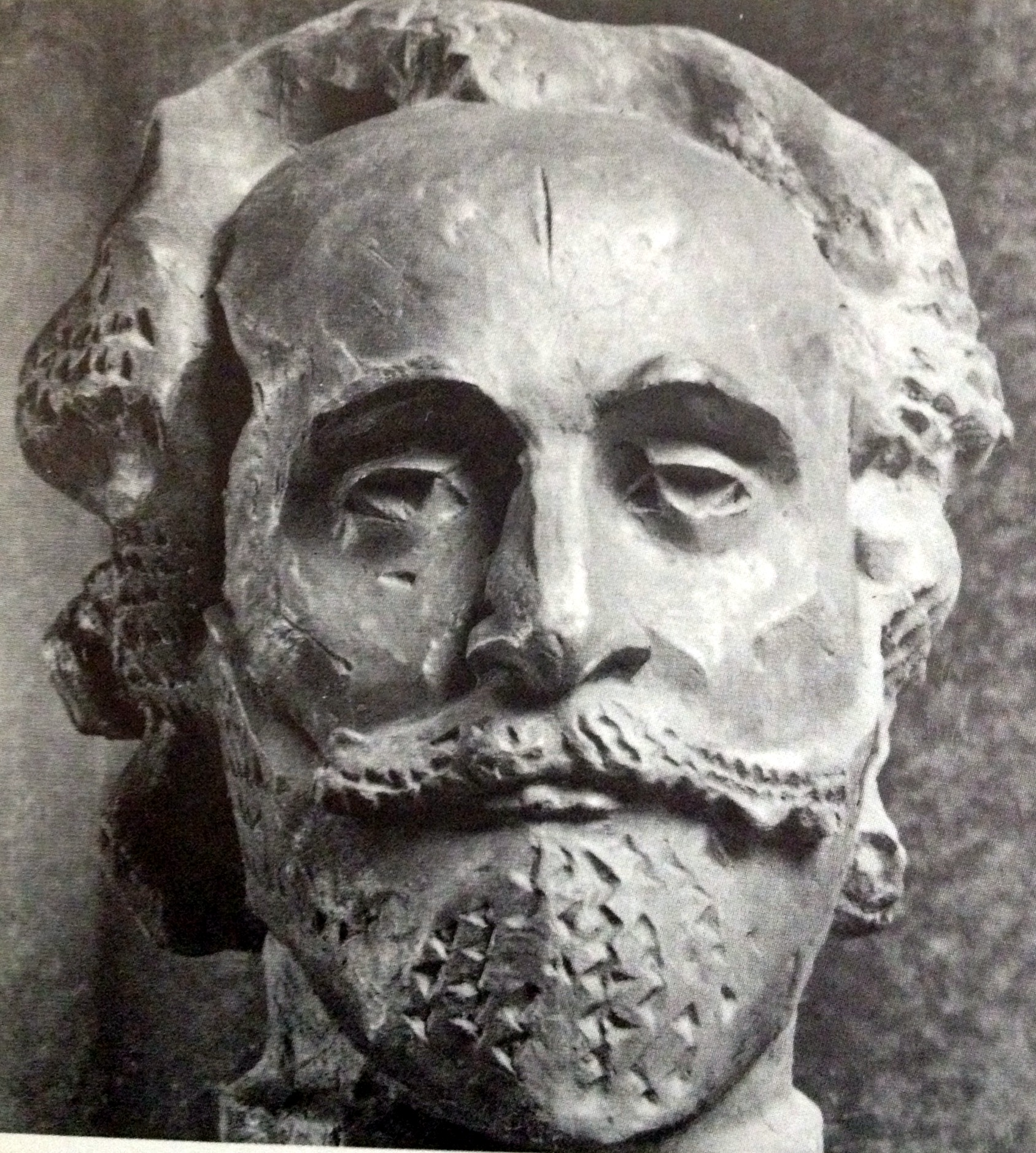
Hovhannes Toumanian

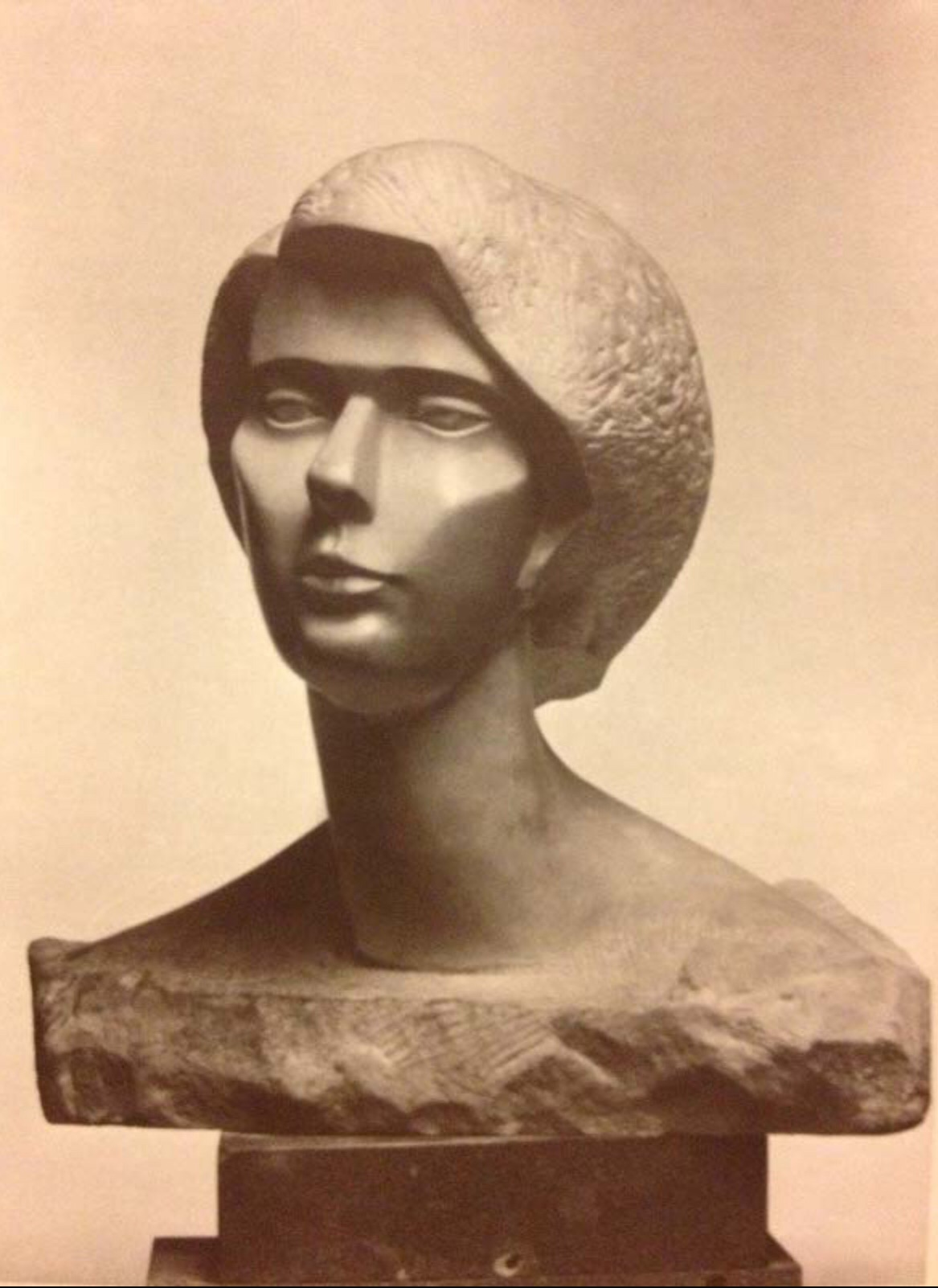
Daughter Susana's portrait, marble, 1978, Tretyakov Gallery fund

== Sources ==
- Ara Harutyunyan's biography
- Сергей Орлов. Творческий вечер памяти профессора А. А. Арутюняна. Портал современной российской скульптуры. Объединение Московских Скульпторов. 2013 г.
- Ара Арутюнян.Б.Зурабов.Советский художник.М.,1986
