= Per Knudsen (Danish footballer) =

Danish footballer (1925–1999)

Personal information
- Date of birth: 2 June 1925
- Place of birth: Aarhus, Denmark
- Date of death: 8 February 1999 (aged 73)
- Place of death: Viby J, Denmark
- Position: Defender

Senior career*
Years	Team	Apps	(Gls)
- AGF

International career
1948–1952	Denmark	2	(0)
Medal record
Men's football
Representing Denmark
Olympic Games
Bronze medal – third place	1948 London	Team
- * Club domestic league appearances and goals

Per Knudsen (2 June 1925 – 8 February 1999) was a Danish footballer, who played for AGF as a defender. He was also a member of the Danish team which competed at the 1948 and 1952 Summer Olympics, but he did not play in any matches.

== Honours ==
Denmark

- Olympic Bronze Medal: 1948
