= August Neuburger =

German politician (1902–1999)

Member of the Bundestag
- In office 7 September 1949 – 15 October 1961

Personal details
- Born: 22 December 1902
- Died: 2 February 1999 (aged 96)
- Party: CDU

August Neuburger (December 22, 1902 – February 2, 1999) was a German politician of the Christian Democratic Union (CDU) and former member of the German Bundestag.

== Life ==
Neuburger was a member of the German Bundestag from its first election in 1949 to 1961. He represented the Bruchsal constituency in parliament as a directly elected member of parliament. From 1949 to 1953 Neuburger was chairman of the Capital Committee of the Bundestag.

== Literature ==
Herbst, Ludolf; Jahn, Bruno (2002). Vierhaus, Rudolf (ed.). Biographisches Handbuch der Mitglieder des Deutschen Bundestages. 1949–2002 [Biographical Handbook of the Members of the German Bundestag. 1949–2002] (in German). München: De Gruyter - De Gruyter Saur. p. 1715. ISBN 978-3-11-184511-1.
