= Mesegar de Corneja =

- municipality
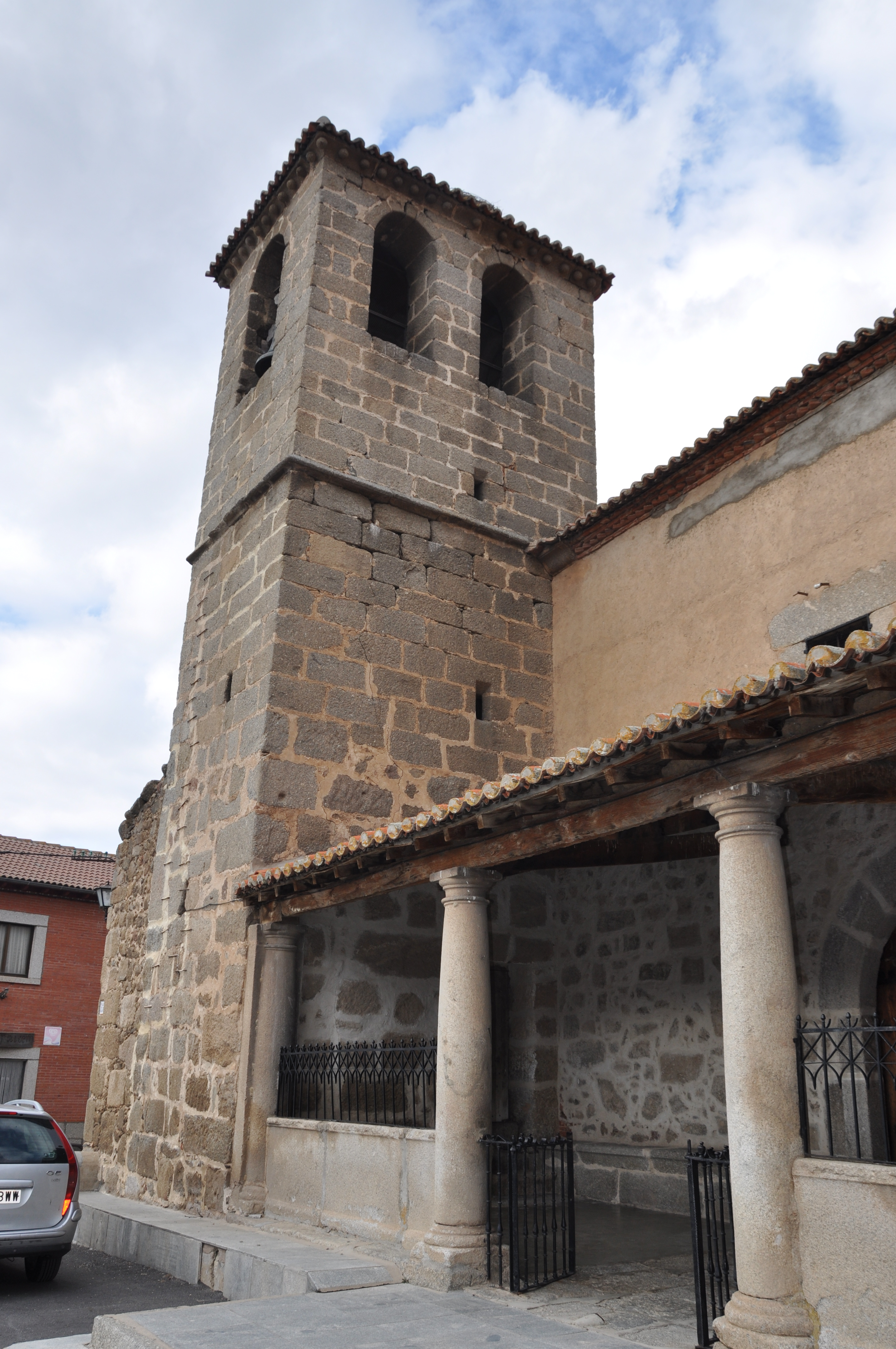
- Parish church of Mesegar de Corneja

- Flag Coat of arms

- Location in Spain. Mesegar de Corneja (Spain)
- Coordinates: 40°30′10″N 5°18′06″W
- Country: Spain
- Autonomous community: Castile and León
- Province: Ávila
- Municipality: Mesegar de Corneja

Area
  - Total: 10.29 km^{2} (3.97 sq mi)
- Elevation: 1,018 m (3,340 ft)

Population (2025-01-01)
  - Total: 62
  - Density: 6.0/km^{2} (16/sq mi)
- Time zone: UTC+1 (CET)
  - Summer (DST): UTC+2 (CEST)
- Website: Official website

Mesegar de Corneja is a municipality located in the province of Ávila, Castile and León, Spain.

== Population ==
Historical population
Year	Pop.	±% p.a.
2023	76	—
2024	66	−13.16%
2025	62	−6.06%
Source: INE
