= William Churton =

William Churton (died December 1767) was an early North Carolina surveyor.

== Biography ==
He moved to Great Britain's North American colonies in about 1749 as a surveyor and cartographer for the Granville District which included all of North Carolina north of the 35 degree, 34 minute parallel, a strip 60 miles (97 km) wide. This line had only been surveyed as far west as the Haw River at that time. The northern boundary, the Virginia line, had been run as far west as the Blue Ridge in present-day Stokes County by 1729. At that date, the entire area was still a part of Bertie County and extended west to the Pacific Ocean, the claims of the Spanish and French notwithstanding.

In 1749, William Churton, and Crown lawyer Daniel Weldon, representing the interests of Lord Granville, along with Peter Jefferson and Joshua Fry, representing the interests of the Colony of Virginia, surveyed an additional 90 miles (140 km) westward of the Blue Ridge to Steep Rock Creek.

Daniel Weldon’s seat was near the present town of Weldon. Peter Jefferson was the father of Thomas Jefferson and Joshua Fry was formerly a professor of mathematics and natural philosophy at the College of William & Mary.

Jefferson and Fry had earlier (1746) completed a similar survey of the extensive holdings of Lord Fairfax in western Virginia. More to the point, they had, in 1749, formed a venture called the Loyal Land Company, which included Lewises and Meriwethers and other Albemarle County residents. The Loyal Land Company was chartered “... for the discovery and sale of western lands” and was granted “eight hundred thousand acres [3,200 km²] in one or more surveys beginning on the Bounds between this Colony & North Carolina & running to the Westward & the North...” Jefferson and Fry needed to establish the southern boundary of Virginia so as to delineate the limits of their grant.

The southern boundary of the Granville district was soon extended as far west as Cold Water Creek at what is now the Rowan–Cabarrus county line but did not reach the Blue Ridge until September 1772.

Churton further surveyed a portion of the area beyond the Blue Ridge between August 1752 and January 1753, accompanied by Moravian Bishop August Gottlieb Spangenberg and a party of Moravians to survey tracts totaling 98,925 acres (400 km²) in the “Blue Mountains” for the Moravians.

Bishop Spargenburgs’ diary provides glimpses of William Churton wherein he is characterized as “certainly a reasonable man” and “excessively scrupulous” in his surveying practice and a “good companion”. Churton maintained a relationship with the Moravians until his death.

The Virginia commissioners, Jefferson and Fry, produced a map of Virginia in 1751 which showed much detail in the adjacent Granville district. They again produced a second edition in 1755 with significant increases in detail in the western areas of the Granville district. It appears that said detail was, in both cases, obtained from William Churton, although no credit is given to Churton on either of the Jefferson-Fry maps.

Lord Granville’s revenue from his land was derived from a “quitrent” to be collected yearly from the landholders of his land. The term is derived because it “quit” the landholder from certain feudal obligations to which Lord Granville was entitled under provisions of the charter. The quitrent varied from time to time from a farthing to a halfpenny per acre, without regard to location, productivity or other consideration.

Churton deferred the drawing of the plats and writing of the deed until he returned to Granville’s office in Edenton. Long delays inevitably ensued. Churton sometimes assisted the waiting grantees caught in such delay by intervening with Granville’s agents and on occasion, paying the accumulated quitrents himself.

Many of his original plats survive today in the State Archives of North Carolina.

In 1753, Churton and one William Vigers received a grant for 635 acres (2.6 km²) to hold in trust for the establishment of the Town of Salisbury. The next year, Churton likewise received a grant of 663 acres (2.7 km²) to establish the town of Orange, which was subsequently renamed Corbinton, then Childsburg and finally Hillsborough on the north bank of the Eno River.

Churton and his assistant Enoch Lewis laid out 120 lots of 1-acre (0.0040 km^{2}) for the new town in the summer of 1754. Churton had been appointed Register of Deeds for the new county of Orange County when it was erected in 1752, but the actual function was carried out by his deputy, William Reed, because of his necessary extended absences in his surveying practice.

Churton was a representative from Orange in the Colonial Assembly from 1754 until 1762, although he appears not to have been a resident of what was then Childsburg until 1757. He was a town commissioner from 1759 until his death and served as Justice of the Peace after 1757 and likewise was appointed County Surveyor for Orange County in 1757.

In 1759, Churton received by an act of the Assembly, four lots of 1-acre (4,000 m^{2}) in the town, designated as lots F, G, H and K in the southeastern quadrant, “in consideration of the many services he hath performed for the Inhabitants of the said Town, and his Labor, Expense, and Pains in laying out the said Town.” This grant was reaffirmed in the act of 1766 which renamed the town Hillsborough.

Churton was actively engaged in producing a topographic map of the Province of North Carolina from 1757 although he did not himself survey the southern and coastal areas, but relied of “information and old maps”. In November 1766, Governor Tryon laid the finished Churton map before the General Assembly which paid Churtons’ fee of 155 Pounds. The Governor assured Churton that if he would endeavor to “complete and make perfect the southern and maritime parts of the province’” he should with Tryon’s approval take the map to England and present it to the Board of Trade.

In 1767, when Churton began to actually survey the coastal areas he discovered that that portion of his map was so defective that he “condemned and cut off that portion.”

Churton died in December 1767 and Governor Tryon caused the work to be completed by Claude Joseph Sauthier and John Abraham Collet, Swiss Engineers and Cartographers, and the work is known today as the “Collet Map”.

Churton Street, the main north-south street in Hillsborough, was named for William Churton. Due to the efforts of Stewart Dunaway, North Carolina Highway Historical Marker G-136 was dedicated to William Churton on November 4, 2017.
