= Jeanne Vidal =

French fencer

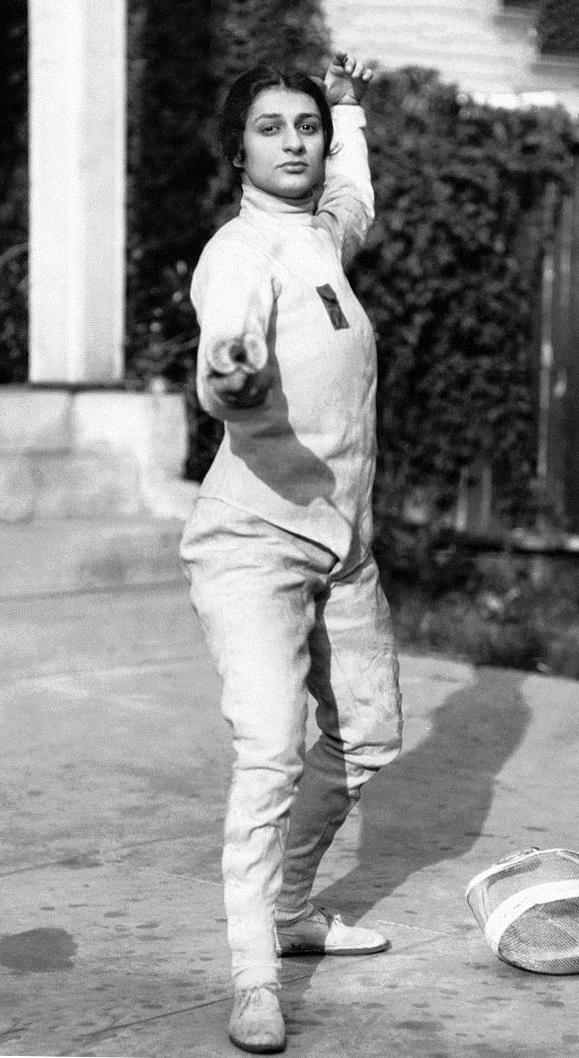
- Jeanne Vidal in 1930

Personal information
- Born: 12 March 1908
- Died: 27 February 1999 (aged 90)

Sport
- Sport: Fencing

Jeanne Vidal (12 March 1908 – 27 February 1999) was a French fencer. She competed in the women's individual foil event at the 1932 Summer Olympics.
