= Robert Eger =

Swiss hockey player

Personal information
- Nationality: Swiss
- Born: 1923
- Died: 6 February 1999 (aged 75–76)

Sport
- Sport: Field hockey

Robert Eger (1923 – 6 February 1999) was a Swiss field hockey player. He competed in the men's tournament at the 1948 Summer Olympics.
