= Diocese of Hải Phòng =

Roman Catholic diocese in Vietnam

Coordinates: 20.8610°N 106.6807°E

Diocese of Hải Phòng Dioecesis Haiphongensis Giáo Phận Hải Phòng

Catholic
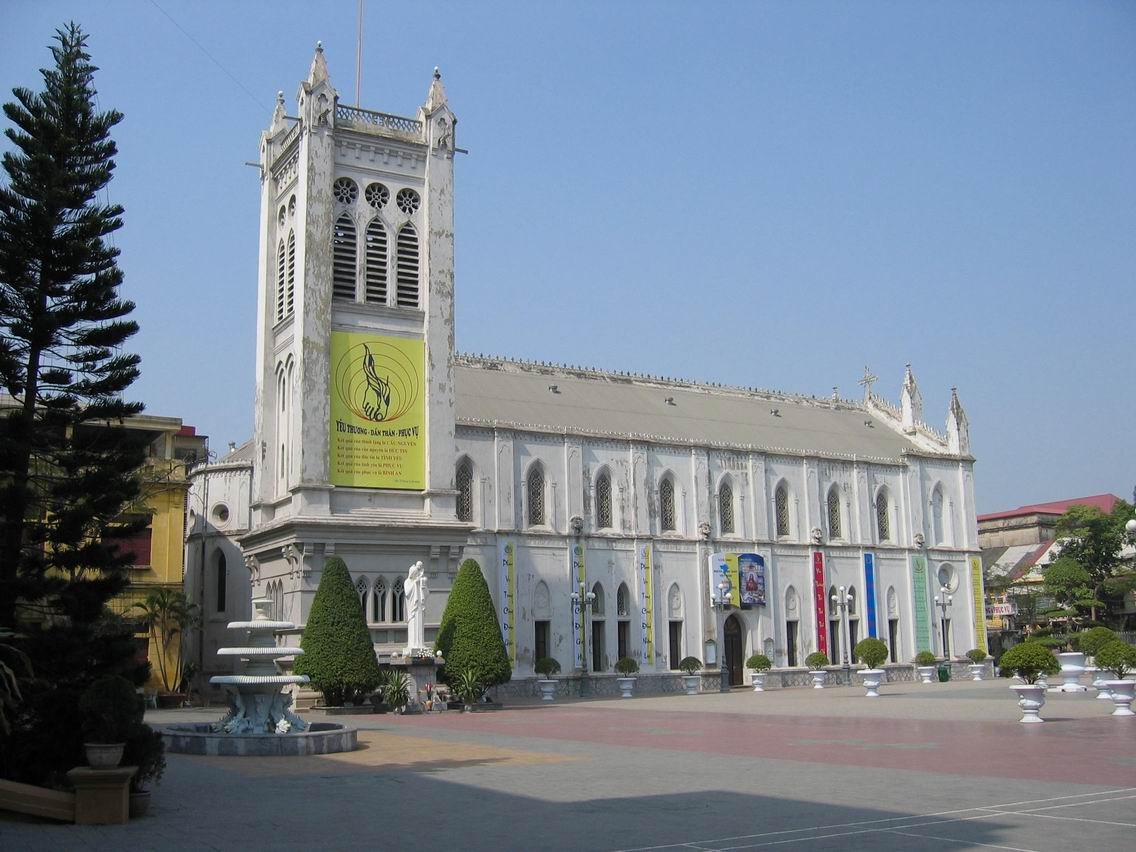
- Hải Phòng Cathedral

- Coat of arms of Bishop Bản

Location
- Country: Vietnam
- Ecclesiastical province: Hà Nội

Statistics
- Area: 9,079 km^{2} (3,505 sq mi)
- Population: Total; Catholics: (as of 2022); 5,317,960; 144,890 (2.7%)
- Parishes: 98

Information
- Denomination: Roman Catholic
- Sui iuris church: Latin Church
- Rite: Roman Rite
- Established: 24 July 1678; 345 years ago as Apostolic Vicariate; 24 November 1960; 63 years ago as Diocese
- Cathedral: Cathedral of the Queen of the Most Holy Rosary
- Patron saint: Our Lady of the Rosary

Current leadership
- Pope: Leo XIV
- Bishop: Vincent Nguyễn Văn Bản
- Metropolitan Archbishop: Joseph Vũ Văn Thiên

Website
- Website of the Diocese

The diocese of Hải Phòng (Latin: Dioecesis Haiphongensis) is a Roman Catholic diocese in northern Vietnam. The bishop is Vincent Nguyên Văn Ban, since 2022.

The creation of the diocese in its present form was declared 24 November 1960. The earliest forms of Roman Catholic institutions appeared in that territory since 1655, with French and Spanish missionaries until the middle of the 20th century.

The diocese covers an area of 10,000 km^{2}, and is a suffragan diocese of the Archdiocese of Hanoi.

By 2004, the diocese of Hai Phòng had about 113,092 believers (2.4% of the population), 29 priests and 62 parishes.

Queen of the Rosary Cathedral in Hai Phong has been assigned as the Cathedral of the diocese.

Many migrant workers from other regions of Vietnam, who work in that busy port city, attend masses in Hai Phong.

In 2008, the Bishop of Hai Phong Diocese Joseph Vu Van Thien took part in World Youth Day 2008 in Sydney, Australia, where he presented a speech at the Homily at the Opening Mass for Vietnamese Youth.

== Ordinaries ==
=== Vicar Apostolic of Eastern Tonking (1678-1924) ===
Vicar apostolic		Period in office	Status	Reference
1	Bishop François Deydier, M.E.P.	November 25, 1678 – July 1, 1693	Died in office	
2	Bishop Raimondo Lezzoli, O.P.	October 20, 1696 – January 18, 1706	Died in office	
3	Bishop Juan de Santa Cruz, O.P.	April 3, 1716 – August 14, 1721	Died in office	
4	Bishop Tommaso Sextri, O.P.	August 14, 1721 – August 8, 1737	Died in office	
5	Bishop Hilario di Jesu Costa, O.A.D.	August 8, 1737 – March 11, 1757	Died in office	
6	Bishop Santiago Hernández, O.P.	August 13, 1757 – February 06, 1777	Died in office	
7	Bishop Manuel Obellar, O.P.	January 29, 1778 – September 07, 1789	Died in office	
8	Bishop Feliciano Alonso, O.P.	October 1, 1790 – February 2, 1799	Died in office	
9	Bishop Ignacio Clemente Delgado Cebrián, O.P.	February 2, 1799 – July 12, 1838	Died in office, martyred.	
10	Bishop Jerónimo Hermosilla Aransáez, O.P.	August 2, 1839 – November 1, 1861	Died in office, martyred.	
11	Bishop Hilarión Alcáraz, O.P.	November 1, 1861 – 1868	Resigned	
12	Bishop Antonio Colomer, O.P.	February 11, 1870 – June 1, 1883	Transferred to Northern Tonkin	
13	Bishop José Terrés, O.P.	May 29, 1883 – April 2, 1906	Died in office	
14	Bishop Nicasio Arellano, O.P.	April 11, 1906 – April 14, 1919	Resigned	
15	Bishop Francisco Ruiz de Azúa Ortiz de Zárate, O.P.	April 14, 1919 – December 03, 1924	Remained as Vicar apostolic of Hai Phòng.	

=== Vicar apostolic of Hai Phòng (1924-1960) ===
Vicar apostolic		Period in office	Status	Reference
15	Bishop Francisco Ruiz de Azúa Ortiz de Zárate, O.P.	December 3, 1924 – May 22, 1929	Died in office	
16	Bishop Alejandro García Fontcuberta, O.P.	May 31, 1930 – February 14, 1933	Died in office	
17	Bishop Francisco Gómez de Santiago, O.P.	February 18, 1933 – 1952	Died in office	
18	Bishop Joseph Trương Cao Ðại	January 8, 1953 – 1960	Resigned	
–	Bishop Joseph-Marie-Pierre Khuất Văn Tạo	May 07, 1955 – November 24, 1960	Apostolic Administrator	

=== Bishop of Hai Phòng (1960-present) ===
Bishop		Coat of arms	Period in office	Status	Reference
1	Bishop Joseph-Marie-Pierre Khuất Văn Tạo		November 24, 1960 – August 19, 1977	Died in Office	
2	Bishop Joseph Marie Nguyễn Tùng Cương		January 10, 1979 – February 10, 1999	Died in Office	
3	Bishop Joseph Vũ Văn Thiên		November 26, 2002 – November 17, 2018	Transferred to Hanoi	
–	Archbishop Joseph Vũ Văn Thiên		November 17, 2018 – March 19, 2022	Apostolic Administrator	
4	Bishop Vincent Nguyễn Văn Bản		March 19, 2022–present	Current bishop	

Coadjutor Vicar Apostolic of Eastern Tonking (1716–1919)

		Period in office	Reference
1	Bishop Tommaso Sextri, O.P.	March 18, 1716 – August 14, 1721	
2	Bishop Hilario di Jesu Costa, O.A.D.	October 3, 1735 – April 8, 1737	
3	Bishop Ignacio Clemente Delgado Cebrián, O.P.	February 11, 1794 – February 2, 1799	
4	Bishop Domingo Henares de Zafra Cubero, O.P.	September 9, 1800 – June 25, 1838	
5	Bishop Romualdo Jimeno Ballesteros, O.P.	August 2, 1839 – June 20, 1845	
6	Bishop Hilarión Alcáraz, O.P.	September 5, 1848 – November 1, 1861	
7	Bishop Gaspar Fernández, O.P.	March 27, 1863 – July 19, 1868	
8	Bishop José Terrés, O.P.	February 6, 1875 – May 29, 1883	
9	Bishop Francisco Ruiz de Azúa Ortiz de Zárate, O.P.	June 19, 1917 – April 14, 1919	

Coadjutor Vicar Apostolic of Hai Phòng (1932–1933)

		Period in office	Reference
–	Bishop-elect Francisco Gomez de Santiago, O.P.	November 28, 1932 – February 18, 1933	
