= Mats Nyberg (sailor) =

Swedish sailor

Personal information
- Nationality: Swedish
- Born: 13 December 1959; Växjö, Sweden
- Died: 13 February 1999 (aged 39); Verbier, Switzerland

Sport
- Sport: Sailing

Mats Nyberg (13 December 1959 – 13 February 1999) was a Swedish sailor. He competed at the 1988 Summer Olympics, the 1992 Summer Olympics, and the 1996 Summer Olympics.
