= 2026 in Seychelles =

- Decades: 2000s; 2010s; 2020s
- See also: History of Seychelles; List of years in Seychelles

Events in the year 2026 in Seychelles.

== Incumbents ==
- President: Patrick Herminie
- Vice-President: Sebastien Pillay

== Events ==
=== November ===
- 6 November – The US cuts off Seychelles-registered money exchanger MEXC due to transactions involving Iran, North Korea, and Russia.

== Holidays ==
- 1 January – New Year's Day
- 3 April – Good Friday
- 4 April – Holy Saturday
- 6 April – Easter Monday
- 1 May – Labour Day
- 4 June – Corpus Christi
- 18 June – Constitution Day
- 29 June – National Day
- 15 August – Assumption Day
- 1 November – All Saints Day
- 8 December – Immaculate Conception
- 25 December – Christmas Day
