= List of political parties in Seychelles =

This article lists political parties in Seychelles. Seychelles has a two-party system, which means that there are two dominant political parties (US and LDS), with extreme difficulty for anybody to achieve electoral success under the banner of any other party.

== The parties ==
=== Parliamentary parties ===
Party	Abbr.	Position	Ideology	MPs
United Seychelles; Seselwa: Parti Lepep (former); French: Seychelles unies	US	Centre-left to left-wing	Democratic socialism; Social democracy	19 / 34
Seychellois Democratic Alliance; Seselwa: Linyon Demokratik Seselwa; French: Union démocratique seychelloise	LDS	Centre	Liberalism	15 / 34

=== Other parties ===
Name	Native name	Ideology	Notes
Seychelles United Movement	Movman Linite Seselwa	Democratic socialism	Reform, Unity, Prosperity
Seychelles Democratic Party	?	Conservatism	Originally supported British rule.
One Seychelles	Y'en Sel Sesel	?	?
New Seychelles Alliance	Lalyans Nouvo Sesel	?	?
Mouvman Lavwa Seselwa	Mouvman Lavwa Seselwa	Social democracy	?
Seychelles People National Movement	Mouvman Nasyonal Pep Sesel	Nationalism, Conservatism, Populism	?
Laliberte	?	Social liberalism	?

=== Former parties ===
Former parties
Name	Native name	Ideology	Notes
Seychelles Movement for Democracy	?	Democracy	Active during the 90s.
Seychelles United Party (SUP) (formerly the New Democratic Party)	?	?	?
Independent Conservative Union of Seychelles (ICUS)	?	?	?
Seychellois Alliance	Lalyans Seselwa	?	Was part of Linyon Demokratik Seselwa until 2018.

The election of the National Assembly was held on the 22–24 October 2020. The Seychelles National Party, the Seychelles Party for Social Justice and Democracy and the Seychelles United Party formed a coalition, Linyon Demokratik Seselwa (LDS). The coalition won the majority of the seats.

== See also ==
- Politics of Seychelles
- List of political parties by country
