= 2025 in Seychelles =

- Decades: 2000s; 2010s; 2020s
- See also: Other events of 2025; Timeline of Seychellois history

Events in the year 2025 in Seychelles.

== Incumbents ==
- President: Wavel Ramkalawan (LDS, until 26 October); Patrick Herminie (US, since 26 October)
- Vice-President: Ahmed Afif (until 26 October); Sebastien Pillay (since 28 October)

== Events ==
=== February ===
- February – Seychelles becomes the first country to comply with the Fisheries Transparency Initiative.

=== March ===
- March 22 – IndiGo starts a route from Mumbai to Seychelles.

=== April ===
- April 5 – Egypt and The Seychelles sign a memorandum of understanding on visa exemption for nationals.
- April 7 – A tri-services all-women expedition is flagged off from Mumbai for the Seychelles.

=== May ===
- May 1–11 – 2025 FIFA Beach Soccer World Cup

=== September ===
- September 27 – 2025 Seychellois general election (first round): No candidate wins a majority in the first round of the presidential election, triggering a runoff vote between incumbent president Wavel Ramkalawan and Patrick Herminie.

=== October ===
- October 9–11 – 2025 Seychellois general election (second round): Incumbent president Wavel Ramkalawan loses reelection to Patrick Herminie.

== Holidays ==
- 1 January – New Year's Day
- 2 January – New Year Holiday
- 19 April – Good Friday
- 20 April – Holy Saturday
- 21 April – Easter Monday
- 1 May – Labour Day
- 18 June – Constitution Day
- 19 May – Corpus Christi
- 29 June – National Day
- 15 August – Assumption Day
- 1 November – All Saints Day
- 8 December – Immaculate Conception
- 25 December – Christmas Day
