= Cannabis in Seychelles =

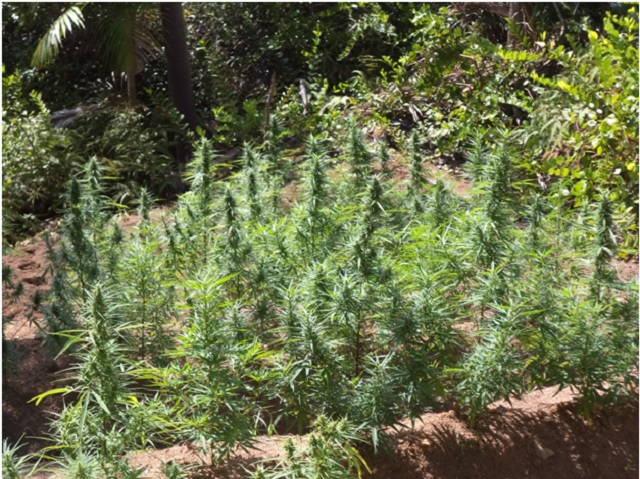
Cannabis plant being cultivated illegally at Bougainville in the Anse Royale district of Seychelles.

Cannabis in Seychelles is illegal, with cultivation, possession and sale of the substance banned. Regardless of this, the controlled substance has seen continual use within Seychelles, with statistics indicating that more than a quarter of the nation's population are users of the drug, as well as use evident amongst adolescents. Cannabis is ingested in a variety of forms for medicinal or recreational use.

Recently the fight for legalization of cannabis has included a petition calling for legalisation signed by 5–10% of the nation's population, and a court case ordering the government to allow medical use.

== Legislation and policy ==
=== Current status ===
Under the Misuse of Drugs Act, 2016, cannabis and its by-products are an illegal Class B drug. The offences relating to cannabis, as clarified within the include any person who purchases, possesses, or uses the drug, imports or exports the drug, cultivates it, possesses or purchases instruments, utensils or equipment intended to facilitate cultivation, and/or traffics cannabis in any quantity. The legislation states that regarding trafficking, if the person has been convicted of an offence of trafficking more than 1.5kg of cannabis or cannabis resin, the Court shall treat the offence as aggravated in nature.

In terms of evidence and investigation, any individual who has been proven or presumed to possess 25 grams or more of cannabis in any form will be presumed to have intent to traffic the drug. Thus, the individual is liable to be investigated by the relevant legal officers of the Seychelles. The law also provides the ability to a police officer to stop and search an individual suspected of having possession of cannabis without a warrant.

=== History ===
Misuse of Drugs Act, 2016

The National Assembly of the Seychelles.
- Long title: An Act to provide for effective measures against abuse and diversion of controlled drugs and precursors; facilitate the investigation and prosecution of offences involving controlled drugs, in particular drug trafficking; promote the treatment education, rehabilitation, recovery and social reintegration of drug users and drug dependent persons; ensure the availability of controlled drugs for legitimate medical and scientific use; facilitate international drug control conventions and for matters connected therewith or incidental thereto.
- Citation: Misuse of Drugs Act
- Territorial extent: Seychelles
- Enacted by: The President of Seychelles and the National Assembly.
- Assented to: 15 April 2016
- Commenced: 20 June 2016
- Effective: 20 April 2016
- Bill citation: Misuse of Drugs Act
- Status: In force

The status of cannabis's illegality within the Seychelles initially found its basis in the laws of Mauritius. With the politicians of the time deciding to implement the 1882 legislation enacted within the Mauritius verbatim into the Seychelles legal system. In doing so, when Mauritius re-opened the cannabis trade from the years 1883 up until 1887, there was confusion regarding whether or not these changes in law had applied to the Seychelles.

The most recent change to Seychelles' cannabis laws was the Misuse of Drugs Act, 2016. This legislation was passed by unanimous Assembly vote and replaced an act of 1990. The act sought to give more powers to fight drug trafficking and abuse and to make the investigation of drug-related offences and prosecution easier. The law also placed a substantial emphasis on the need to promote treatment, education, rehabilitation, recovery, and social reintegration of individuals suffering addiction. Other acts were also amended to allow the new act to be enforceable, including the Prisons Act and the Criminal Procedure Code. Minister for Home Affairs Charles Bastienne tabled the bill, and said that it took into account challenges such as the increasing numbers serving drug related prison sentences, which he considered worrying and unsustainable, and the increase in the number of addicts despite more detoxification services and programmes being offered. Bastienne said that the law provided "different new initiatives which will be more effective and transparent with regard to supply reduction, harm reduction and in particular demand reduction”.

=== Proposed amendments to the law ===
In February 2020, the Misuse of Drugs (Cannabidiol-based products for medical purposes) Regulations, 2020 was gazetted with plans for the regulation to be put before the Seychelles National Assembly for a final debate and approval. The regulations would make cannabis legal for medical purposes, setting out the manner in which importation of medicinal cannabis should be carried out, guidelines for medical specialists to approve a patient for use of medicinal cannabis based products and rules regarding the access, storing and administering of the drug. The legislation would also address miscellaneous issues regarding medicinal cannabis, including prohibitions placed on advertising medicinal cannabis and its related products.

== Legalization efforts ==
The Seychelles News Agency said in 2019 that the subject of cannabis is one that is still taboo in Seychelles, but many Seychellois have pushed for legalization of cannabis for recreational as well as medicinal use.

=== Recreational use ===
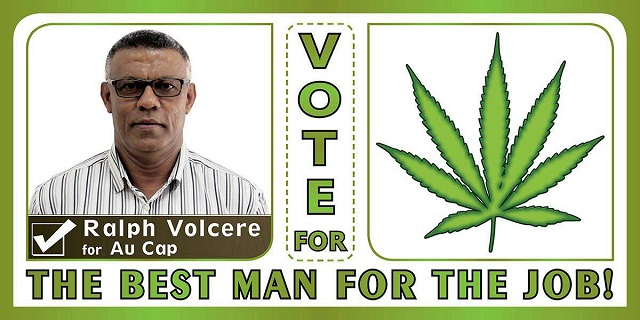
Ralph Volcere pushed for the complete legalisation of cannabis to deal with the nations crippling heroin abuse issues when he ran for the Au Cap seat in the 2016 Seychelles National Assembly elections.

In 2017, a group of Seychellois petitioned for the legalization of cannabis. The movement was spearheaded by Ralph Volcere, who ran as an independent candidate for the Au Cap district in the 2016 National Assembly elections. Volcere and his group sought to remove cannabis from the list of class A, B, or C drugs, make its use legal for those aged 21 and above, and implement laws that made it illegal to drive while under the influence of the drug.

The group argued that legalizing cannabis would help address the nation's severe issues with heroin abuse. The Agency for the Prevention of Drug Abuse and Rehabilitation of the Seychelles reported in 2018 that the country had between 5,000 and 6,000 heroin users, equivalent to almost 10 percent of the nation's working population, and that Seychelles had the highest rate of heroin abuse per capita of any country. Volcere argued that based on his own research many addicts turned towards heroin when they could not access cannabis. He claimed that drug dealers intentionally deplete the market of cannabis in order to drive heroin sales as it is more profitable. Volcere said, "It is clear that a large number of youths are hooked on heroin and if nothing is done apart from lip service it is going to get much worse".

The director of the Campaign for Awareness, Resilience and Education (CARE), Noella Gonthier, expressed concern about the petition. She said that CARE was "totally against" legalizing cannabis. Gonthier stated that while she was aware of the medical potentials of cannabis, she believed that any medicinal legalization should be done under stringent control and by the appropriate experts. Gonthier also said that CARE was "concerned about the misguided information around the subject matter, in particular to children and adolescents", and said that the decision should not be based on the vested interest of cannabis proponents.

By 15 August 2017, the petition had 5,000 signatures, and Volcere said that the petition received over 10,000 signatures within a few weeks. Volcere said in an interview in June 2019 that the petition had reaffirmed his belief in the wider Seychellois’ support for the legalization of cannabis in one form or another.

=== Medicinal use ===
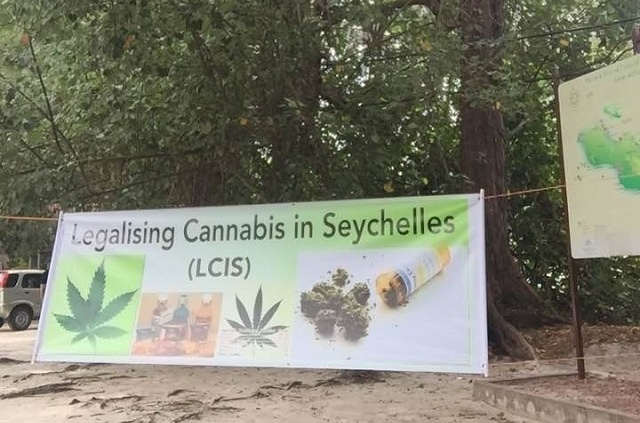
The LCIS movement pushed for the medicinal legalization of cannabis first as they believed this pursuit had more immediate potential.

The 2017 petition sought to legalize cannabis for any use, including medical use. After the petition, Ralph Vocere and his supporters decided to pursue the legality of medical cannabis first, with future plans to push for recreational legalization. Volcere stated that he had a personal interest as his own mother suffered from Alzheimer's disease and required medicinal cannabis. Volcere claimed that many individuals contacted him after his run in the 2016 National Assembly election regarding the need for medical cannabis in the Seychelles.

in October 2017, Volcere brought a case to the Constitutional Court of Seychelles, on behalf of his mother, pushing for the government to make amendments to the Misuse of Drugs Act, 2016 to provide provisions for the use of cannabis as a form or medicine for sufferers of chronic and terminal illnesses. In June 2019, the court ruled in favor of Volcere, ordering the government to begin to make relevant provisions for the legalization of medicinal cannabis.

In February 2020, the Misuse of Drugs (Cannabidiol-based products for medical purposes) Regulations, 2020 was gazetted, with plans to go before the National Assembly for final debate and approval. The regulation provides information regarding the processes that parties are required to follow to provide access to a patient or caregiver, to obtain, possess, store, administer or use medicinal cannabis. Volcere welcomed the gazetting of the regulations but felt them to be restrictive and would limit the ability of those in need of the medicine to acquire it.

== Usage ==
In December 2017, the Agency for the Prevention of Drug Abuse and Rehabilitation of the Seychelles estimated there to be approximately 25,000 users of tetrahydrocannabinol (the main psychoactive cannabinoid that produces the 'high' sensation). This represented more than a quarter of Seychelles’ population.

=== Usage in youth ===
The Global School-based Student Health Survey (GSHS) is a collaborative surveillance project overseen by the World Health Organization. It uses self-administered questionnaires to obtain data relating to morbidity and mortality of its respondents. Within the Seychelles, the GSHS has been run twice to date, once in 2007 and then again in 2015. On both occasions the survey was structured in a two-stage cluster sample design, targeting students aged typically between 11 and 17 years in age.

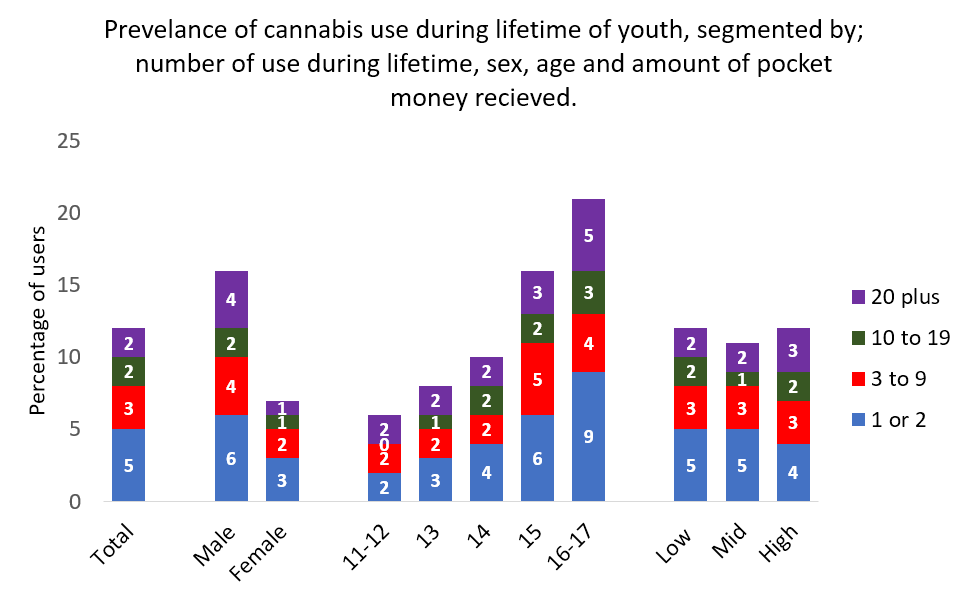
Overall the proportion of use amongst youth increased substantially with age and was more evident within males.

The Seychelles 2015 GSHS indicated that 12% of Seychellois youth aged 11–17 reported having used cannabis in their lifetime. By gender, 16% of males reported trying the drug, compared with 6% of females. The 2015 GSHS also indicated that the prevalence of cannabis use amongst respondents grew with age, with 6% of 11–12 year olds having tried cannabis at least once, compared with 14% of 16–17 year olds. The amount of pocket money received by the students had a negligible effect on their reported cannabis consumption.

The report also stated that in the 30 days prior to the survey, 9% of respondents had used cannabis, and that proportion increased substantially with age and was more prevalent amongst males than females.

When compared to the 2007 GSHS data, the overall prevalence of cannabis use in youth was lower in 2015 by margin of 2%. Boys who had ever used cannabis dropped from 19% to 16%, while usage by girls dropped from 7% to 6%.

A 2011 paper, which used data from the 2007 GSHS, looked at the psychosocial characteristics driving cannabis use within Seychelles’ youth. The paper found that, in this study group, cannabis use was correlated with attempted suicide, insomnia, truancy, feelings of social isolation, and parental disinterest. The researchers considered these psychosocial characteristics to be explanatory for substance abuse, noting that it has been suggested that young people facing these challenges may try to cope with stress and relieve depression by engaging in substance use. The paper also found that while males favored cannabis as an intoxicant, females were inclined towards alcohol use. The researchers concluded by stating need to address the prevention of substance use through comprehensive interventions, and that gender differences should be carefully evaluated when formulating prevention interventions.
