= 2021 in Seychelles =

- Decades: 2000s; 2010s; 2020s
- See also: Other events of 2021; Timeline of Seychellois history

Events in the year 2021 in Seychelles.

== Incumbents ==
- President: Wavel Ramkalawan

== Events ==
Ongoing — COVID-19 pandemic in Seychelles

== Deaths ==
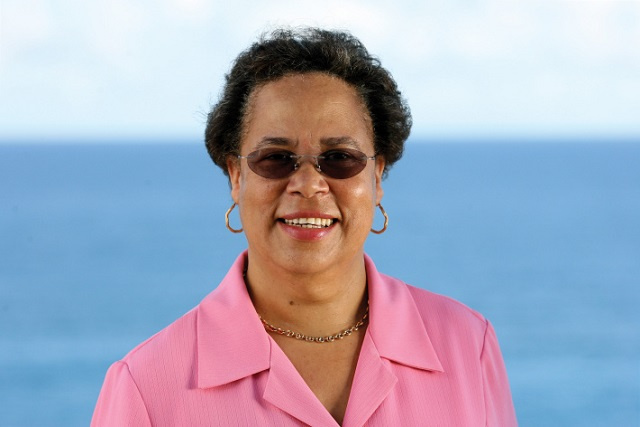
Joevana Charles

- 17 January – Joevana Charles, politician, member of the National Assembly (born 1955).
- 11 May – Nancy Marie, supercentenarian.
