= Leader of the Opposition (Seychelles) =

Leader of the Opposition (French: Chef de l'opposition) is a constitutionally sanctioned office in Seychelles.

The Leader of the Opposition is elected by members of the National Assembly who are members of others parties than the one which nominated the incumbent President of Seychelles.

The position was created in 1993 as part of the transition to multiparty politics.

== Leaders of the Opposition ==
Name	Took office	Left office	Party	Notes
James Mancham	30 July 1993	25 March 1998	DP	
Wavel Ramkalawan	25 March 1998	24 December 2011	SNP	
David Pierre	24 December 2011	15 May 2016	PDM	
Francesca Monnaie	16 May 2016	27 September 2016	PDM	
Wavel Ramkalawan	27 Septiember 2016	28 October 2020	LDS	
Sebastien Pillay	28 October 2020	28 October 2025	US	
Bernard Georges	28 October 2025	Incumbent	LDS	

== See also ==
- Politics of Seychelles
- National Assembly of Seychelles
- President of Seychelles
