= Illegal drug trade in Seychelles =

Drug trafficking in Seychelles

Seychelles is a small island nation with a vast maritime territory, consisting of 115 islands and a 137-million-square-kilometre (53-million-square-mile) Exclusive economic zone. The prevalence of drugs in the country is high and the country is experiencing a heroin epidemic, with an equivalent to 10% of the working force using heroin in 2019. Due to its location along a major trafficking route, drugs can easily be trafficked by sea to the Seychelles.

== History ==
The Seychelles' maritime security response has mainly been based on piracy until the late 2000s, but as piracy incidents decreased, maritime drug trafficking has become of greater focus.

=== Southern Route ===
In the Seychelles, heroin is the most widely used drug, and the country is estimated to have the highest heroin consumption rate in the world per capita. The drug is primarily produced in Afghanistan and trafficked to Seychelles and other small island states in the Western Indian Ocean via the Southern Route. Taking its point of departure in Afghanistan, the Southern Route travels primarily to India, Africa, and Europe via Pakistan or Iran, and in 2018 this route accounted for 6% of global drug quantities. Seychelles has increasingly become a target destination for drug trafficking via the Southern Route due to the country's rising drug consumption, its easy access as part of the major trafficking route, as well as the country's wealth compared to other nations in the western Indian Ocean.

The Western Indian Ocean region experiences increased maritime security issues due to the major smuggling route: the seizure of a ton of heroin off the coast of Eastern Africa in 2014 underscores the significance of this route.

== Drug usage ==
The use of heroin has increased considerably in Seychelles since heroin was introduced to the domestic market in 2005; between 2011 and 2019, heroin users increased from 1200 to between 5000 and 6000, which is around 10% of the working population. Cannabis is also widely used in Seychelles, and cocaine consumption is increasing. In 2017, the Prevention of Drug Abuse and Rehabilitation Agency Act, 2017 was introduced to establish an agency to provide prevention, treatment and rehabilitation to people abusing drugs and alcohol in Seychelles.

Alongside increase in drug use, the island state is reporting an increased number of sex workers, increased HIV/AIDS transmission, and hepatitis C transmission.

== Responses ==
=== National ===
Drug trafficking is high on the government of Seychelles' agenda to reduce transnational crime which threatens the country's economy and security.

The Misuse of Drugs Act, 2016 regulates drug trafficking convictions. Heroin and cocaine are classified as Class A drugs, leading to stricter sentencing than Cannabis which is classified as a Class B drug. The Seychelles News Agency writes that Seychelles has a zero-tolerance on drugs and the maximum sentence as regulated by the Misuse of Drugs Act, 2016 for drug trafficking is life imprisonment for a Class A drug and 50 years imprisonment for a Class B drug. The first case involving life imprisonment for drug trafficking was in 2015, when two Seychelles men were found in possession of 47 kilograms of cannabis.

==== The Anti-Narcotics Bureau ====
The National Drug Enforcement Agency (NDEA) was responsible for combating drug trafficking until the Anti-Narcotics Bureau (ANB) was founded in 2018. The ANB is an integrated division of the Seychelles police that manages counter-narcotic activities in the country, it has a substantial maritime component, policing powers and the power to arrest. The ANB frequently cooperates with the Seychelles Coast Guard, which performs naval duties in Seychelles waters at a regular basis and is primarily responsible for countering pirate activity.

=== Regional ===
Since piracy declined as a major issue in the region, the fight against drug trafficking has taken priority, and Seychelles is collaborating with other actors in the region to combat it. Currently, the UN Ad-Hoc Committee on the Indian Ocean and Indian Ocean Rim Association (IORA) provide the organisational structure necessary to develop maritime security policies, but their influence is limited.

There are several other regional projects headed by international donors such as the United Nations Office on Drugs and Crime (UNODC), International Maritime Organization (IMO) and the EU aimed at tackling drug trafficking in the Western Indian Ocean. The UNODC created the Forum on Maritime Crime (IOFMC) which focus on capacity building measures to enhance maritime security in the region. One of the focus areas of the IOFMC is the drug trafficking along the Southern Route. For several years, the UNODC Global Maritime Crime Programme has delivered maritime law enforcement training courses to the Seychelles Coast Guard.

Counter drug-trafficking is challenged by the fact that the boats fare through international waters where the Coast Guard or ANB lack policing powers. The drugs are typically transported in hulled dhows, which makes it difficult to find during vessel searches

=== Corruption ===
Although measures have been implemented to respond to the growing drug trafficking problem, success is impaired due to corruption. Seychelles, along with Mauritius, stand out from other East African countries because drug markets fuel corruption which, in turn, impedes effective policy responses. Despite establishing an anti-corruption body in 2016, no drug-related corruption cases have been prosecuted, and corruption continues to threaten law enforcement and state institutions; police officers have been seen taking bribes while investigations of drug market players are hampered. Corruption cases rarely makes it to the public debate as the Seychelles’ does not have an independent press.
