= Francesca Monnaie =

Seychelles politician

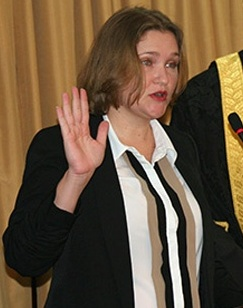
- Monnaie taking the oath of office

Leader of the Opposition
- In office 17 May 2016 – 27 September 2016
- Preceded by: David Pierre
- Succeeded by: Wavel Ramkalawan

Personal details
- Born: 1986 (age 39–40)
- Party: Popular Democratic Movement

Francesca Monnaie (born 1986) is a Seychelles politician who served as Leader of the Opposition in the National Assembly from 17 May 2016 until 27 September 2016. She was Secretary-General of the Popular Democratic Movement (PDM) from 2011 to 2016.

== Parliament ==
Francesca Monnaie was the Secretary-General of the Popular Democratic Movement (PDM) party from its founding in 2011. In the 2011 parliamentary election, she was the PDM candidate for Bel Ombre. Although the PDM did not win constituency seats, it was allocated one proportional list seat in the National Assembly. PDM leader David Pierre took this seat, and became Leader of the Opposition as the sole opposition member.

In 2016, Pierre resigned as PDM leader; Secretary-General Monnaie became interim leader of the party. Pierre then also resigned from the Assembly. Monnaie was sworn in to take the PDM seat on 17 May 2016. Besides serving on several parliamentary committees, she chaired the Finance & Public Accounts Committee.

The PDM did not participate in the 2016 parliamentary election. Wavel Ramkalawan returned as Leader of the Opposition in the new Assembly.
