= Politics of Seychelles =

Seychellois political system

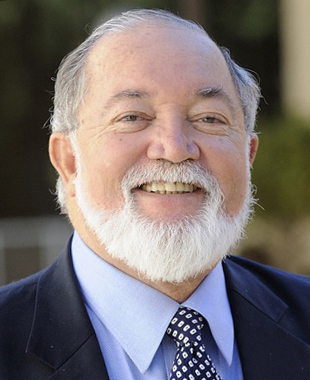
James Mancham, founder of the SDP and former President of Seychelles. Mancham's party maintained power until 1977, when he was deposed in a coup run by supporters of René.

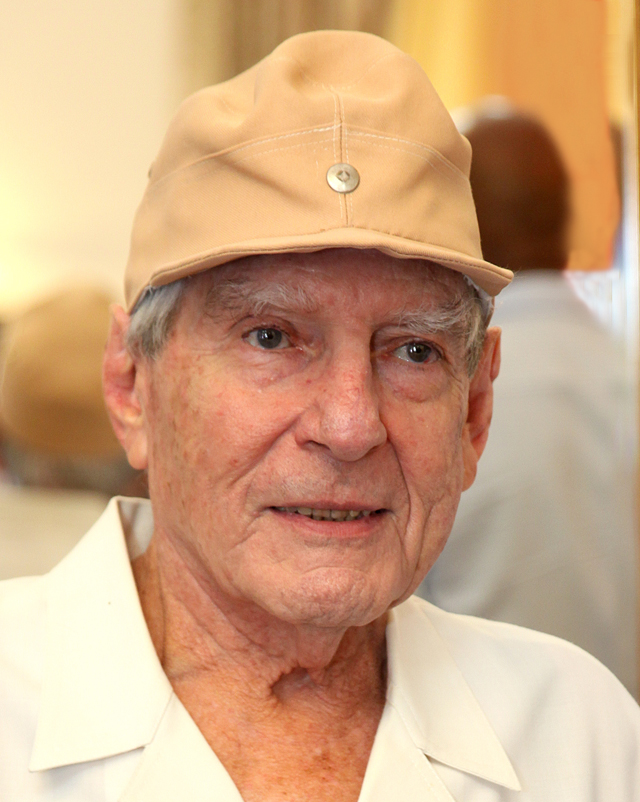
France-Albert René, founder of the SPUP and former President of Seychelles. René seized power in 1977 and retained it until 2004, when he retired from office.

The politics of Seychelles have historical roots in both one-party socialism and autocratic rule. Following independence from the United Kingdom in 1976, Seychelles was a sovereign republic until 1977, when the original President and leader of the Seychelles Democratic Party, James Mancham, was overthrown in a bloodless coup by the Prime Minister France-Albert René. René installed a single-party socialist state under the Seychelles People's Progressive Front in 1979 which remained in power until 1993, when multiparty elections took place for the first time since independence, after restoring the multi-party system in 1991. Modern day Seychelles governance takes place in a framework of a presidential republic, whereby the President of Seychelles is both head of state and head of government, and of a multi-party system. Executive power is exercised by the government. Legislative power is vested in both the government and the National Assembly.

== Political history ==
=== Pre-independence political movements ===
While under British colonization, the people of the Seychelles had little to no say in how they were governed. Following the end of World War I, however, this began to change. The first political movement in the Seychelles was the Planters Association, which came into existence around 1918. In addition to the movement of the Planters Association, workers in the Seychelles petitioned the government about their poor working conditions and tax structure, which led to some proposed reform by the governor at the time, Governor Sir Arthur Grimble. Ultimately though, these reforms did not go into action, as the beginning of World War II put everything on hold.

The Planters Association was primarily focused on the interests of rich, white landowners and not the workers whom they employed. The League of Coloured Peoples formed as a result, and demanded minimum wage laws and health care reform.

The first actual political party, the Taxpayers Association, was not formed until 1939. This Taxpayers Association was also an organization primarily made up of rich white landowners, so its goals were, again, purely the advancement of their personal interests and the interests of the plantocracy.

1948 marked the first year in which Seychelles enjoyed any sort of suffrage, but it was limited only to literate property owners, which made up just 2,000 people in a population of over 36,000. As a result of the first elections in 1948, most representatives on the new Legislative Council were members of either the Planters' or Taxpayers' organizations.

In 1964, the Socialist Seychelles People's United Party (SPUP) was formed. Led by London-educated lawyer France-Albert René, they campaigned on a platform of autonomy from Britain. Another London-educated lawyer, James Mancham headed the Seychelles Democratic Party (SDP), which was created the same year, and by contrast wanted closer integration with Britain. Early elections between these two parties seemed in part based on the personal rivalry between these two leaders.

As a result of the 1967 elections, the first elections under universal adult suffrage, each party gained three seats in the legislature. Mancham's SDP retained a single-seat lead in the legislature, despite the SPUP having a slight margin of victory in number of votes. This result was met with protests and strikes by supporters of the SPUP throughout the following year.

1970 brought constitutional revisions to the colonial government of Seychelles, instituting a smaller-scale parliamentary system, but leaving plurality voting for the single-member districts. In the following elections in both 1970 and 1974, Mancham gained a small majority in votes, but a large one in seats, through a voting system which relied on the principle of "first past the post". Specifically in the 1974 elections, Mancham's SDP won a disproportionate amount of seats, 13 out of 15, with just barely over half of the vote.

Social unrest was rampant during this period, with strikes and protests, as well as bombings in 1972, all attributed to the SPUP. While this was partially attributable to the issues faced with the voting system, tensions regarding independence and rumored political repression and jailing of SPUP activists was also a factor.

In June 1975, the SDP and SPUP began a coalition government in order to negotiate independence with Britain. The British Government was asked to appoint an electoral review commission so that differences in opinion on legislative makeup and representation could be reconciled. An informal agreement between the two parties was reached, and ten seats were added to the Legislative Assembly, five to be nominated by each party. A cabinet of ministers also was formed consisting of eight members of the DP and four of the SPUP, with Chief Minister Mancham becoming prime minister.

=== Independence ===
Although Mancham's SDP had initially opposed independence, public opinion on the island heavily favored it, and on June 29, 1976, the British officially granted independence to the Seychelles. Mancham was named the new president, and René became prime minister. The new government kept the original distribution of seats per their 1975 agreement. Each party agreed to a "grand coalition" until 1979, when the next elections would take place.

Less than one year after independence, on 5 June 1977, the SPUP overthrew the newly formed government in a bloodless coup while Mancham was overseas at a Commonwealth conference in London. René initially denied involvement, but eventually took responsibility as leader of the SPUP. This coup was claimed to have been to prevent the establishment of a one-party state, but likely was more motivated by the SPUP's lack of representation in the newly formed legislature. Following the coup, René was installed as president and ruled by proclamation for the next two years, before imposing a new constitution in 1979 without referendum. During this period, the SPUP was formally renamed the Seychelles People's Progressive Front, and became the sole ruling party of the new single-party socialist state. New elections were also called in 1979, and René was formally elected President of Seychelles.

=== One-party socialism ===
One-party socialism was established in the Seychelles in 1979 by France-Albert René and his SPUP, and ended in 1991. During this time the state built one of Africa's highest gross domestic products per capita.

=== Return to multiparty system ===
After almost sixteen years of one-party rule, President René announced a return to the multiparty system of government at an Extraordinary Congress of the ruling Seychelles People's Progressive Front (SPPF) on 4 December 1991. On 27 December 1991, the Constitution of Seychelles was amended to allow for the registration of political parties. Among the exiles returning to Seychelles was James Mancham, who returned in April 1992 to revive his party, the Democratic Party (DP). By the end of that month, eight political parties had registered to contest the first stage of the transition process: election to the Constitutional Commission, which took place on 23–26 July 1992.

The Constitutional Commission was made up of twenty two elected members, fourteen from the SPPF and eight from the DP. It commenced work on 27 August 1992 with both President René and Mancham calling for national reconciliation and consensus on a new democratic constitution. A consensus text was agreed upon on 7 May 1993 and a referendum to approve it called for 15–18 June. The draft was approved with 73.9% of the electorate in favor of it and 24.1% against.

23–26 July 1993 saw the first multiparty presidential and legislative elections held under the new constitution, as well as a resounding victory for President René. Three political groups contested the elections—the SPPF, the DP, and the United Opposition (UO)—a coalition of three smaller political parties, including Parti Seselwa. Two other smaller opposition parties threw in their lot with the DP. All participating parties and international observer groups accepted the results as "free and fair."

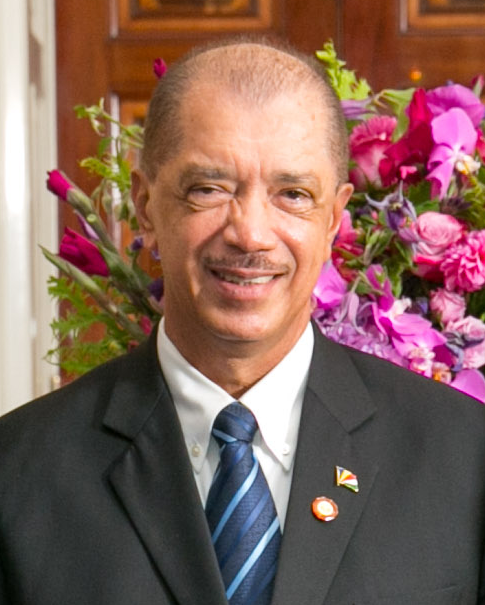
James Michel served as president from 2004 to 2016. Michel also served as vice president under René.

Three candidates again contested the 1998 presidential election: Albert René (SPPF), James Mancham (DP), and Wavel Ramkalawan. Again, President René and his SPPF party enjoyed a landslide victory. The President's vote in the 20–22 March elections jumped to 66.6% from 59.5% in 1993, while the SPPF garnered 61.7% of the total votes cast in the National Assembly election, compared to 56.5% in 1993.

=== The twenty-first century ===
National Assembly building (opened 2009)

Early elections originally set for 2003 were called in August/September 2001. The Government Party SPPF again prevailed, although the main Opposition Party, Seychelles National Party (previously known as the United Opposition Party) headed by Wavel Ramkalawan, made a surprisingly strong showing and collected 46% of the total votes. The DP, headed by Mancham, did not take part in the elections.

In July 2004, René retired as president, passing the office to his vice president, James Michel. At the next presidential election in July 2006, Michel polled 53.7% of valid votes, Wavel Ramkalawan 45.7% and Phillip Boulle 0.6%. In the May 2007 National Assembly elections, Seychelles People's Progressive Front took 56.2% of votes and Seychelles National Party in coalition with Seychelles Democratic Party took 43.8%. This gave SPPF 18 directly elected seats plus 5 nominated, total 23 seats with the SNP/DP coalition taking 7 directly elected plus 4 nominated, total 11 seats.

The new National Assembly building on Ile du Port, Victoria opened in 2009. The building was partly financed by the Government of China.

Michel's vice president, Danny Faure, was sworn in following the former's surprise resignation in October 2016. In the October 2020 general election, Wavel Ramkalawan, an Anglican priest, defeated Faure by 54.9% to 43.5%, and the opposition therefore took power for the first time since 1977. The Seychelles National Party, the Seychelles Party for Social Justice and Democracy and the Seychelles United Party formed a coalition, Linyon Demokratik Seselwa (LDS), to contest the National Assembly. LDS won 25 and former ruling party United Seychelles (US) 10 seats of the 35 seats of the National Assembly. However, in the 2025 Seychellois general election United Seychelles won 15 out of 26 seats in the parliament.

In October 2025, presidential runoff was won by former parliamentary speaker and main opposition leader, Patrick Herminie, meaning Herminie's party, United Seychelles (US) returned to power. On 26 October 2025, Patrick Herminie was sworn in as Seychelles’ sixth president.

== Executive branch ==
Main office-holders
Office	Name	Party	Since
President	Patrick Herminie	US	October 2025

The President of Seychelles, who is both head of state and head of government, is elected by popular vote for a five-year term of office, and can be re-elected only once.

The cabinet is presided over and appointed by the President, subject to the approval of a majority of the legislature.

== Legislative branch ==
The National Assembly/Assemblée Nationale has 34 members, elected for a term of five years, 25 members elected in single-seat constituencies and 9 members elected by proportional representation.

== Political parties and elections ==
=== Presidential elections ===
Candidate	Running mate	Party	Votes	%
Wavel Ramkalawan	Ahmed Afif	Linyon Demokratik Seselwa	35,562	54.91
Danny Faure	Maurice Loustau-Lalanne	United Seychelles	28,178	43.51
Alain St Ange	Peter Sinon	One Seychelles	1,021	1.58
Total			64,761	100.00
Valid votes			64,761	98.10
Invalid/blank votes			1,256	1.90
Total votes			66,017	100.00
Registered voters/turnout			74,634	88.45
Source: ECS

=== Parliamentary elections ===
Party	Votes	%	Seats			
Party	Votes	%	FPTP	PR	Total	+/−
Linyon Demokratik Seselwa	35,202	54.84	20	5	25	+6
United Seychelles	27,185	42.35	6	4	10	−4
One Seychelles	1,420	2.21	0	0	0	New
Seychellois Alliance	70	0.11	0	0	0	New
Independents	317	0.49	0	0	0	0
Total	64,194	100.00	26	9	35	+2
Valid votes	64,194	97.30				
Invalid/blank votes	1,784	2.70				
Total votes	65,978	100.00				
Registered voters/turnout	74,634	88.40				
Source: ECS

== Administrative divisions ==
Seychelles is divided in 25 administrative districts; Anse aux Pins, Anse Boileau, Anse Etoile, Anse Royale, Au Cap, Baie Lazare, Baie Sainte Anne, Beau Vallon, Bel Air, Bel Ombre, Cascade, English River, Glacis, Grand' Anse (on Mahe), Grand' Anse (on Praslin), Inner Islands, Les mamelles, Mont Buxton, Mont Fleuri, Plaisance, Pointe Larue, Port Glaud, Roche Caiman, Saint Louis, Takamaka.

== International organization participation ==
Agence de Coopération Culturelle et Technique, ACP, AfDB, African Union, Commonwealth of Nations, ECA, FAO, Group of 77, IBRD, ICAO, International Red Cross and Red Crescent Movement, IFAD, International Finance Corporation, IFRCS, International Labour Organization, International Monetary Fund, International Maritime Organization, InOC, Intelsat (nonsignatory user), Interpol, IOC, International Organization for Standardization (correspondent), International Trade Union Confederation, Non-Aligned Movement, OPCW, Port Management Association of Eastern and Southern Africa (PMAESA), Southern African Development Community, UN, UNCTAD, UNESCO, United Nations Industrial Development Organization, UPU, World Health Organization, WMO, WToO, WTrO (applicant).
