= Justin Valentin =

Seychellois politician and teacher

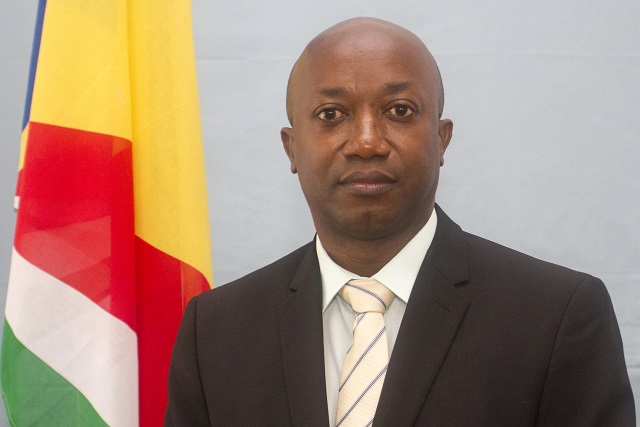

Minister of Education
- In office 3 November 2020 – 26 October 2025
- President: Wavel Ramkalawan
- Preceded by: Jeanne Siméon
- Succeeded by: David Pierre

Personal details
- Born: Justin Davis Valentin; 14 April 1971 (age 55)
- Party: Linyon Demokratik Seselwa
- Occupation: Teacher, politician

Justin Davis Valentin (born 14 April 1971) is a Seychellois politician and teacher. In 2018, he was appointed Vice-Chancellor of the University of Seychelles. Valentin served as the Minister of Education and Human Resources Development from 2020 to 2025.

== Biography ==
Valentin received his diploma in education from Seychelles Polytechnic. He continued his studies in Australia, and graduated with a Bachelor of Education from the Edith Cowan University, followed by a master's degree from Universiti Sains Malaysia, and a doctorate from King's College London. He specialised in science and mathematics. He first worked as a teacher and continued his career as a researcher at the Ministry of Education.

In 1993, Valentin published Testanman Rezete, a novel written in Seychellois Creole, the French-based creole language spoken in the Seychelles. In 2013, Valentin became the Dean for Business and Law of the University of Seychelles. On 2 February 2018, he was appointed Vice-Chancellor of the university. On 30 October 2020, he was elected Minister of Education and Human Resources Development and was sworn in on 3 November 2020, succeeding Jeanne Siméon.

== Bibliography ==
- Testanman Rezete (1993. Lenstiti Kreol) (in Seychellois Creole)
- Enn ti zafer pour Marmay (2001. Lenstiti Kreol; ISBN 99931-5067-3) (Children's book in Seychellois Creole)

Educational offices
Preceded by Dennis Hardy	Vice-Chancellor of University of Seychelles; 2017 to 2020	Succeeded by Joëlle Perreau
