= Bernard Georges (politician) =

Seychellois politician

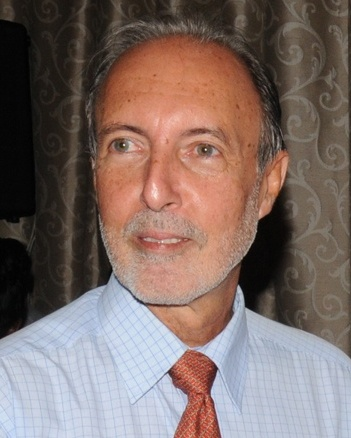

Leader of the Opposition
- Incumbent
- Assumed office 28 October 2025
- Preceded by: Sebastien Pillay

Leader of Government Business
- In office 28 October 2020 – October 2025
- Preceded by: Charles DeCommarmond

Member of the National Assembly
- Incumbent
- Assumed office 2002

Personal details
- Born: 24 August 1955 (age 71) Crown Colony of Seychelles
- Party: LDS
- Education: Fitzwilliam College, Cambridge
- Occupation: Politician

Bernard Georges (born 24 August 1955) is a Seychellois politician who served as the Leader of Government Business in the National Assembly of Seychelles.

== Biography ==
A lawyer by profession, he is a member of the Seychelles National Party, and was first elected to the Assembly in 2002. Georges' popularity in Seychelles was fueled in part by his radio program on Seychelles Broadcasting Corporation's SBC Radio which explained the laws and how they worked to people of Seychelles. He and his wife, Annette, run the law firm, "Georges and Georges", which specializes in property and commercial disputes. In 2015, he was appointed to Judge of the Court of Justice for the Common Market for Eastern and Southern Africa.

== Education ==
He is a graduate of Fitzwilliam College, Cambridge.
