= Confait =

Confait is a surname. Notable people with the surname include:

- Marina Confait, Seychellois civil servant
- Murder of Maxwell Confait (1945–1972), Seychellois murder victim
- Vincent Confait (born 1959), Seychellois sprinter
