= 2023 in Seychelles =

- Decades: 2000s; 2010s; 2020s
- See also: Other events of 2023; Timeline of Seychellois history

Events in the year 2023 in Seychelles.

== Incumbents ==
- President: Wavel Ramkalawan
- Vice-President: Ahmed Afif

== Events ==
Ongoing — COVID-19 pandemic in Seychelles

- 7 December — An explosion on the island of Mahé injures at least 100 people

== Deaths ==
- 26 May – French Chang-Him, 85, Anglican clergyman, archbishop of the Indian Ocean (1984–1995).
