= 2015 Seychellois presidential election =

- 3–5 December 2015 (first round); 16–18 December 2015 (second round)
- Registered: 70,943
- Turnout: 87.40% (first round); 90.06% (second round)
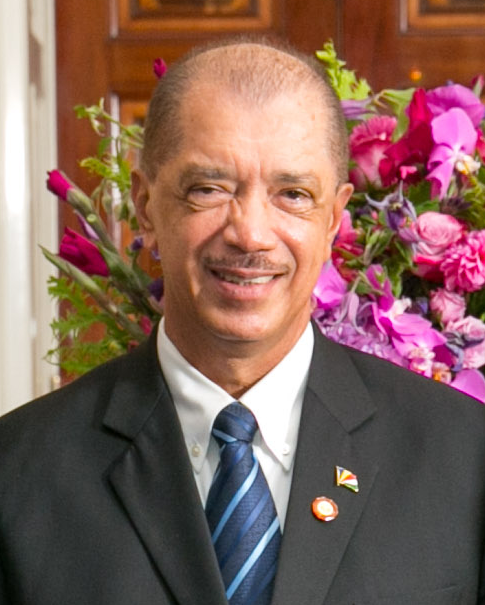

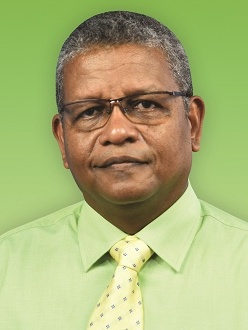
| Nominee | James Michel | Wavel Ramkalawan |
| Party | People's Party | SNP |
| Running mate | Danny Faure | Roger Mancienne |
| Popular vote | 31,512 | 31,319 |
| Percentage | 50.15% | 49.85% |
President before election
James Michel
People's Party
Elected President
James Michel
People's Party

Presidential elections were held in Seychelles between 3 and 5 December 2015. As no candidate received more than 50% of the vote in the first round, a second round was held between 16 and 18 December. Incumbent President James Michel was re-elected, defeating opposition leader Wavel Ramkalawan by just 193 votes in the second round. Ramkalawan claimed there had been "many irregularities", including vote buying.

== Background ==
The elections were initially scheduled to take place between 19 and 21 November 2015, but were moved "to give more time to political parties to prepare for the elections".

== Campaign ==
The official nomination process closed on 11 November 2015. In October 2015 incumbent President James Michel of the People's Party announced his intention to run for re-election for a third and final term. Since the re-introduction of democracy in 1993, candidates from the People's Party have won all presidential and parliamentary elections in Seychelles.

Alexia Amesbury, leader of the Seychelles Party for Social Justice and Democracy, was the first woman to contest a presidential election in Seychelles.

== Results ==
Michel fell short of a majority in the first round, receiving about 48% of the vote, and therefore a second round was required. The second place candidate, long-time opposition leader Wavel Ramkalawan, received the support of third place candidate Patrick Pillay for the second round.

Michel won the second round by a very small margin, beating Ramkalawan by only 193 votes, according to results announced by the electoral commission on 19 December 2015. Ramkalawan disputed the results and requested a recount. Michel was sworn in on 20 December.

| Candidate | Running mate | Party | First round | | Second round | |
| Candidate | Running mate | Party | Votes | % | Votes | % |
|---|---|---|---|---|---|---|
| James Michel | Danny Faure | People's Party | 28,911 | 47.76 | 31,512 | 50.15 |
| Wavel Ramkalawan | Roger Mancienne | Seychelles National Party | 21,391 | 35.33 | 31,319 | 49.85 |
| Patrick Pillay | Ahmed Afif | Seychellois Alliance | 8,593 | 14.19 | | |
| Alexia Amesbury | Roy Fonseka | Seychelles Party for Social Justice and Democracy | 832 | 1.37 | | |
| Philippe Boullé | Peter Roselie | Independent | 411 | 0.68 | | |
| David Pierre | Hervé Anthony | Popular Democratic Movement | 400 | 0.66 | | |
| Total | | | 60,538 | 100.00 | 62,831 | 100.00 |
| Valid votes | | | 60,538 | 97.64 | 62,831 | 98.34 |
| Invalid/blank votes | | | 1,466 | 2.36 | 1,062 | 1.66 |
| Total votes | | | 62,004 | 100.00 | 63,893 | 100.00 |
| Registered voters/turnout | | | 70,943 | 87.40 | 70,943 | 90.06 |
Source: ECS
