= Rolph Payet =

Rolph Antoine Payet
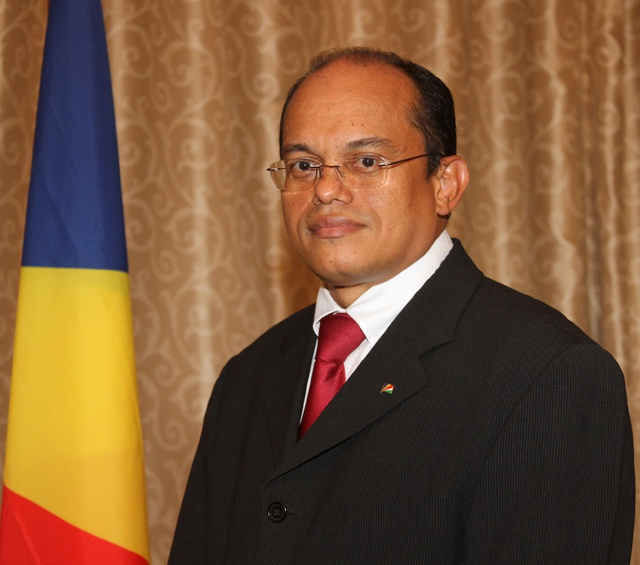

Executive Secretary for the Basel, Rotterdam and Stockholm Convention
- Incumbent
- Assumed office October 2014
- Secretary-General: Ban Ki-moon; António Guterres

Minister for Environment and Energy
- In office March 2012 – October 2014

Principal Secretary for Environment
- In office 2003–2007

Personal details
- Born: August 4, 1968 (age 58) Seychelles
- Education: University of East Anglia; University of Surrey; University of Ulster; Linnaeus University

Rolph Antoine Payet FRGS (born 4 August 1968) is a Seychellois international policy expert, researcher and speaker on environment, climate and island issues, and was the first President & Vice-Chancellor of the University of Seychelles. He was Minister of Environment and Energy in the Cabinet of Seychelles from 2012 to 2014. He is currently United Nations Executive Secretary for the Basel, Rotterdam and Stockholm Convention.

== Personal life ==
Payet was born in Seychelles. He grew up in Rochon, a suburb of the capital, Victoria. As young boy he dreamed of becoming a scientist. He attended Seychelles College, then Mont Fleuri School, completed two years of National Youth Service in Seychelles (1985–1986). He completed his Cambridge O/A-levels at the Seychelles Polytechnic in December 1988, where he was awarded the most outstanding science student. He grew up falling in love with the environment, and after numerous expeditions to islands such as Cerf and Silhouette, decided on a career in environment.

He was educated at the University of East Anglia (BSc Biochemistry, 1992), University of Surrey (MBA), University of Ulster (MSc), the University of London, and the John F. Kennedy School of Government at Harvard University. He received his PhD from Linnaeus University in Environmental Science, where he undertook multidisciplinary research in sustainable tourism.

== Career ==
Payet had a 17-year career in the civil service, and eventually serving as Principal Secretary for Environment from 2003–2007. During that period, he revolutionized environment management in Seychelles and on the international level. He was Seychelles' chief negotiator for the Montreal Protocol, the Basel Convention, and the UNFCCC. He was instrumental in addressing Small Island Developing States issues and in implementing appropriate strategies, institutions and capacity in Seychelles to address these emerging global environmental issues.

He was appointed President & Vice-Chancellor of the University of Seychelles in October 2009.

He is also Special Advisor to the President of the Republic of Seychelles, Mr James Michel, since 2007. In that role he independently advises the President on numerous environmental matters including sustainable development, biodiversity, climate change, energy, and international environment policy.

Rolph Payet is founding member/trustee of the Global Island Partnership, the Sea Level Rise Foundation, the Seychelles University Foundation, the Seychelles Centre for Marine Research and Technology, the Island Conservation Society and the Silhouette Foundation. Dr Payet has also been instrumental in increasing the visibility and impact of numerous regional and international organisations such as the International Coral Reef Initiative (co-chair from 2003–2005), the Global Forum on Oceans, Coasts and Islands, and the Interim Coordinator of the Nairobi Convention UNEP Regional Seas Programme.

Recently, Rolph has been invited to sit on numerous international conference committees and panels, and as moderator/speaker on climate change, biodiversity and island issues. Rolph is periodically invited by the Secretary-General of the UN, Ban Ki-moon, to speak at various UN forums, including the UN General Assembly. His work has also been covered by the international media, such as CNN and the BBC.

Rolph is an elected Central Committee Member of the ruling socialist People's Party and has been active in the social and political life of his party.

== Honors and contributions ==
Rolph has received numerous international awards and recognition for his work on islands, climate change and biodiversity. Rolph is known for his ability to bring together the various disciplines - natural science, economics and business - to innovate solutions for environmental problems. His research in sustainable tourism and climate change continue to benefit numerous tourism developments in Seychelles and elsewhere.

Rolph is a lead author with the Intergovernmental Panel on Climate Change and was involved with the Third and Fourth Assessment Reports. The panel was jointly awarded the 2007 Nobel Peace Prize, and the contribution of many scientists was acknowledged.

Rolph has published numerous peer-reviewed papers, book chapters and one book.

In 2007, he was elected Fellow of the Royal Geographical Society for his contributions to marine research.

In January 2007, Rolph was selected a Young Global Leader by the World Economic Forum.

He received an honorary doctorate from the University of London in March 2016.

Educational offices
New office	President & Vice-Chancellor of University of Seychelles; 2009 to 2012	Succeeded by Marina Confait
