= 2020 in Seychelles =

- Decades: 2000s; 2010s; 2020s
- See also: History of Seychelles; List of years in Seychelles

Events in the year 2020 in Seychelles.

== Incumbents ==
- President: Danny Faure

== Events ==
=== March ===
- 9 March – The country, ahead of the planned arrival of the Norwegian Spirit, announced a temporary closing for cruise ships. Individuals travelling from China, South Korea, Italy, and Iran were also banned with an exception for returning residents.
- 14 March – The country reported its first two cases of COVID-19. The two individuals had been in contact with a person in Italy who tested positive.

=== April ===
- 8 April – After a 26-year-old man working at Seychelles International Airport tested positive for COVID-19 on April 6, a travel ban order came into effect in the country. The measure was maintained for 21 days and excluded essential service workers.
- 28 April – President Danny Faure announced a lifting of some of the lockdown measures that were put in place to forestall the further spread of the pandemic.

=== May ===
- 4 May – All restrictions on the movement of people were lifted and all shops were allowed to open until 20:00. Air Seychelles also resumed domestic flights.
- 9 May – The government extended the ban on cruise ships from entering Port Victoria until the end of 2021.
- 11 May – The first schools in the country re-opened.
- 18 May – All 11 previously confirmed cases in the country recovered, resulting in the government declaring the country free of COVID-19. As a result of the declaration, all schools in the country were re-opened.

=== June ===
- 1 June – After its lockdown on 9 April, the National Museum reopened to the public, making the country the first in Eastern Africa to reopen its museum during the pandemic. All travel restrictions also ended following the reopening of the airport.

=== August ===
- 5 August – The Netherlands and Luxembourg were removed from the list of countries whose citizens could enter the country, while Tunisia was added to it.
- 11 August – The Seychelles International Airport was opened to scheduled traffic after being closed in March.
- 17 August – Belgium, Cuba, France and Malta were removed from the list of travel permitted countries while Portugal was added to it.
- 24 August – Tunisia was again removed from the list of travel permitted countries while Singapore was added to it.
- 31 August – Qatar and Cambodia were added to the list of travel permitted countries and South Korea was removed from it.
