= 2020 Seychellois general election =

- 22–24 October 2020
- Presidential election
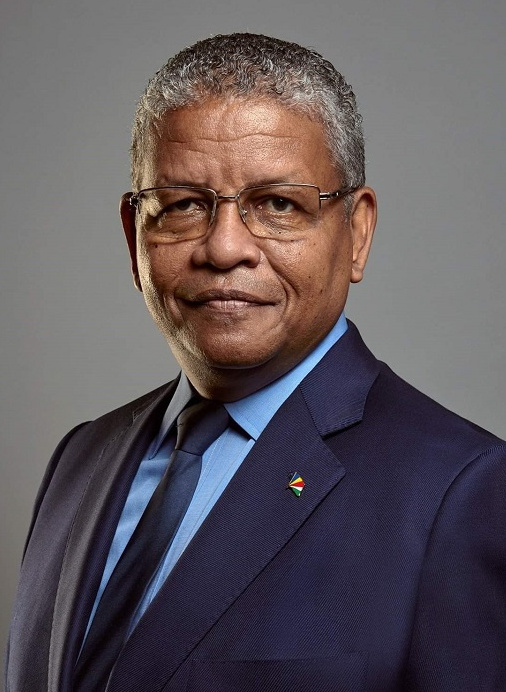

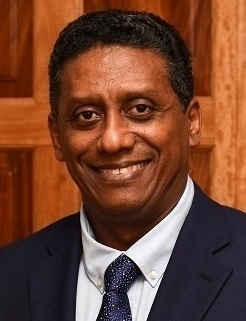
Nominee	Wavel Ramkalawan	Danny Faure
Party	SNP	United Seychelles
Alliance	LDS	None
Running mate	Ahmed Afif	Maurice Loustau-Lalanne
Popular vote	35,562	28,178
Percentage	54.91%	43.51%
President before election
Danny Faure
United Seychelles
Elected President
Wavel Ramkalawan
LDS
- Parliamentary election
- All seats in the National Assembly
Party	Leader	Vote %	Seats	+/–
LDS	Roger Mancienne	54.84	25	+6
United Seychelles	Vincent Meriton	42.35	10	−4
This lists parties that won seats. See the complete results below.
- Maps

General elections were held in Seychelles on 22–24 October 2020 to elect the President and members of the National Assembly. The National Assembly elections had been due in 2021, but in July 2020 were brought forward by President Danny Faure in order to hold them together with the presidential elections, a proposal supported by opposition parties.

The presidential elections were won by Wavel Ramkalawan of the Linyon Demokratik Seselwa (LDS), with the LDS also increasing its majority in the National Assembly, winning 25 of the 35 seats.

In this election, the first Hindu member of the Seychelles National Assembly, Satya Naidu, was elected.

== Electoral system ==
The President of Seychelles is elected using the two-round system; if no candidate receives a majority of the vote in the first round, a second round is held between the top two candidates.

Members of the National Assembly are elected by two methods; 26 (with a new constituency established in 2020) are elected from single-member constituencies using first-past-the-post voting, and up to a further ten are elected based on the percentage of votes received by each party; for each 10% of the total national vote received, a party gets one additional seat.

== Presidential campaign ==
In August 2019, the United Seychelles Party nominated its leader and incumbent president Danny Faure as its candidate during its thirty-third annual congress. Wavel Ramkalawan from the liberal Linyon Demokratik Seselwa (LDS) and Alain St. Ange from the progressive One Seychelles Party (founded on 26 April 2019 and registered on 12 June 2019) are challenging the incumbent. While former speaker of national assembly Patrick Pillay sought nomination, the election commission rejected his candidacy on the ground that he failed to collect the required 500 signatures from registered voters.

While the country recorded only 149 (mostly imported) COVID-19 cases, public health directives still impacted the campaign. For instance, public election rallies were banned. Since there are no active polling institutes, rally attendance had been used to measure support in previous elections. However, the candidates were active in social media, and also participated in the country's first televised presidential debate. The economy was a major campaign issue due to the high cost of living and recent reduction in tourism. While Transparency International ranks Seychelles as one of the 30 least corrupt countries in the world, the incumbent government was considered too accommodating to offshore business interests.

== Results ==
On 25 October, Wavel Ramkalawan was declared the winner of the presidential election with 54.91% of the vote, marking the first peaceful transfer of presidential power between different political parties since independence in 1976. He had run unsuccessfully in the presidential elections from 1998 onward. Danny Faure attended Ramkalawan's victory speech; in his speech, Ramkalawan emphasized reconciliation: "In this election, there were no losers, there were no winners — our country was given the opportunity as the ultimate winner."

=== President ===
Candidate	Running mate	Party	Votes	%
Wavel Ramkalawan	Ahmed Afif	Linyon Demokratik Seselwa	35,562	54.91
Danny Faure	Maurice Loustau-Lalanne	United Seychelles	28,178	43.51
Alain St Ange	Peter Sinon	One Seychelles	1,021	1.58
Total			64,761	100.00
Valid votes			64,761	98.10
Invalid/blank votes			1,256	1.90
Total votes			66,017	100.00
Registered voters/turnout			74,634	88.45
Source: ECS

=== National Assembly ===
Party	Votes	%	Seats			
Party	Votes	%	FPTP	PR	Total	+/−
Linyon Demokratik Seselwa	35,202	54.84	20	5	25	+6
United Seychelles	27,185	42.35	6	4	10	−4
One Seychelles	1,420	2.21	0	0	0	New
Seychellois Alliance	70	0.11	0	0	0	New
Independents	317	0.49	0	0	0	0
Total	64,194	100.00	26	9	35	+2
Valid votes	64,194	97.30				
Invalid/blank votes	1,784	2.70				
Total votes	65,978	100.00				
Registered voters/turnout	74,634	88.40				
Source: ECS

==== By constituency ====
Constituency		LDS		US		OS		Others		Valid	Total	Turnout	Registered
Constituency		Votes	%	Votes	%	Votes	%	Votes	%	Valid	Total	Turnout	Registered
1	Anse Aux Pins	1496	52.8	1254	44.2	84	3.0			2834	2916	88	3304
2	Anse Boileau	1564	53.1	1340	45.5	41	1.4			2945	3012	89	3398
3	Anse Etoile	2161	62.0	1273	36.5	50	1.4			3484	3585	88	4064
4	Anse Royale	1343	46.4	1484	51.3	66	2.3			2893	2893	86	3375
5	Au Cap	1845	61.7	1081	36.2	41	1.4	23	0.8	2990	3071	88	3509
6	Baie Lazare	1324	55.0	1083	45.0					2407	2481	90	2756
7	Baie Ste Anne	1289	43.5	1383	46.7	292	9.9			2964	3051	89	3444
8	Beau Vallon	1727	60.0	913	31.7			239	8.3	2879	2963	87	3421
9	Bel Air	1025	51.7	870	43.9	87	4.4			1982	2028	88	2315
10	Belombre	1726	63.2	1005	36.8					2731	2822	87	3261
11	Cascade	1317	54.2	1084	44.6	27	1.1			2428	2495	90	2785
12	English River	1429	57.5	980	39.5	50	2.0	25	1.0	2484	2575	89	2908
13	Glacis	1713	62.2	985	35.8	55	2.0			2753	2826	86	3270
14	Grand Anse (Mahe)	1428	67.6	685	32.4					2113	2183	88	2478
15	Grand Anse (Praslin)	1296	51.8	1103	44.0	105	4.2			2504	2521	90	2810
16	Ile Perseverance	1438	53.2	1098	40.6	167	6.2			2703	2826	92	3083
17	Inner Islands	665	37.1	1105	61.7	22	1.2			1792	1838	90	2046
18	Les Mamelles	1177	58.1	827	40.8			22	1.1	2026	2084	90	2326
19	Mont Buxton	1449	58.5	993	40.1	35	1.4			2477	2552	89	2882
20	Mont Fleuri	1317	58.9	919	41.1		0.0			2236	2305	87	2643
21	Plaisance	1452	53.2	1221	44.8	55	2.0			2728	2845	87	3257
22	Pointe Larue	966	46.2	1096	52.4	28	1.3			2090	2142	89	2400
23	Port Glaud	870	48.4	929	51.6					1799	1856	92	2008
24	Roche Caiman	776	44.4	781	44.7	192	11.0			1749	1803	91	1990
25	Saint Louis	1281	59.9	781	36.5			78	3.6	2140	2187	85	2572
26	Takamaka	1128	54.7	912	44.2	23	1.1			2063	2118	91	2329
Total		35202	54.8	27185	42.3	1420	2.2	387	0.6	64194	65978	88	74634
Source: ECS

== Reactions ==
- United States: The United States Department of State issued a statement congratulating "the Government of the Republic of Seychelles and the Seychellois people on a successful election." The Department further "congratulate[d] Reverend Wavel Ramkalawan on his election and look[s] forward to expanding cooperation on a wide range of mutual interests."
