= David Pierre =

Seychellois politician and teacher

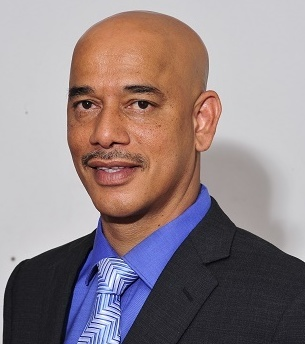

Minister of Education
- Incumbent
- Assumed office 6 November 2025
- President: Patrick Herminie
- Preceded by: Justin Valentin

Personal details
- Born: 1967 (age 58–59)
- Party: United Seychelles
- Occupation: Teacher, politician

David Pierre (born 1967) is a Seychellois politician and teacher. He was a member of the Seychelles National Party until 2011. He then founded the Popular Democratic Movement.

Pierre is a teacher by profession. He was a member of the National Assembly of Seychelles from 2002 to 2016, serving as the parliamentary Leader of the Opposition from 2011 to 2016. He was a candidate for the 2015 presidential election.

In 2016, Pierre was appointed as ambassador to Ethiopia and Permanent Representative of Seychelles to the African Union. He resigned in 2020.
