= 2022 in Seychelles =

- Decades: 2000s; 2010s; 2020s
- See also: Other events of 2022; Timeline of Seychellois history

Events in the year 2022 in Seychelles.

== Incumbents ==
- President: Wavel Ramkalawan

== Events ==
Ongoing – COVID-19 pandemic in Seychelles

== Sports ==
- 15 July – 24 July: Seychelles at the 2022 World Athletics Championships
- 28 July – 8 August: Seychelles at the 2022 Commonwealth Games

== Deaths ==
- 28 January – Joseph Belmont, politician, vice president (2004–2010) (born 1947)
