= Dennis Hardy =

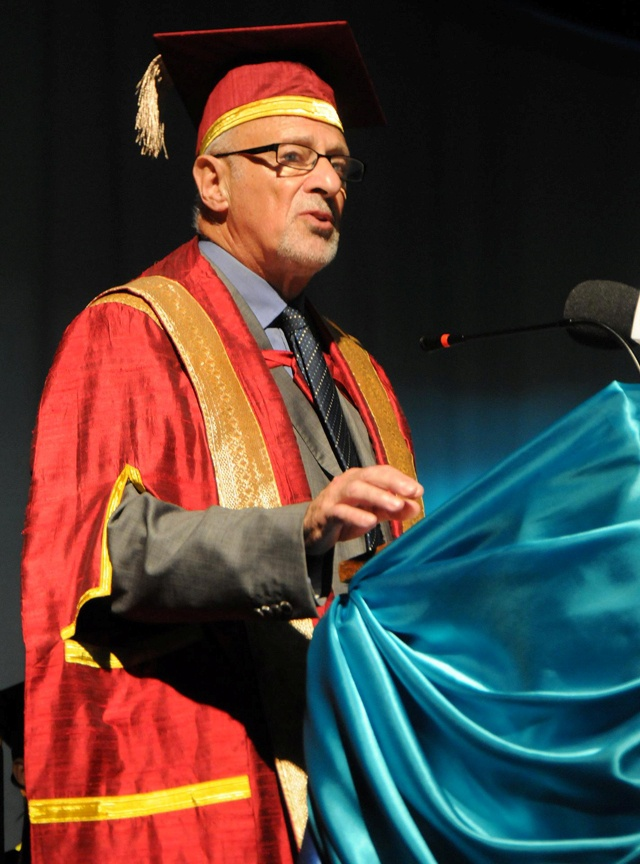
Hardy at the 2014 UniSey graduation ceremony

Emeritus professor Dennis Hardy is former vice-chancellor of the University of Seychelles (UniSey).

== Early life ==
Dennis Hardy received his advanced education at the University of Exeter from where he graduated with bachelor's and master's degrees in geography.

== Career ==
Hardy joined the Greater London Council and qualified as an urban planner at University College London. He subsequently became a fellow of the Royal Town Planning Institute. He has a PhD from the London School of Economics.

Hardy was lecturer in social science and urban planning at Middlesex Polytechnic (now Middlesex University) and subsequently head of department, dean, pro vice-chancellor and deputy vice-chancellor. He then became head of the university's campus in Dubai. He was president of the International Communal Studies Association and dean of the Australian Institute of Business.

In February 2014, Hardy became vice-chancellor of the University of Seychelles, a post he held until 2017.

== Selected publications ==
- Alternative communities in nineteenth century England. Longman, London, 1979.
- Goodnight campers! The history of the British holiday camp. Mansell, London, 1986. (With Colin Ward)
- From garden cities to new towns: Campaigning for town and country planning 1899-1946. Routledge, 1991. ISBN 0419155708 (Series No 13: Studies in History Planning & the Environment Series)
- Utopian England: Community experiments, 1900-1945. Spon, London, 2000.
- Poundbury: The town that Charles built. Town & Country Planning Association, London, 2005. ISBN 978-0902797406
- Cities that don't cost the earth, Town and Country Planning Association, London, 2008.
- The Urban Sea: Cities of the Mediterranean. Blue Gecko Books, May 2013. ISBN 978-0957568501

Educational offices
Preceded by Marina Confait	Vice-Chancellor of University of Seychelles; 2014 to 2017	Succeeded by Justin Valentin
