= Joëlle Perreau =

Seychellois linguist

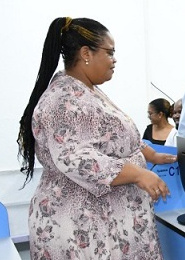

5th Vice-Chancellor of the University of Seychelles
- Incumbent
- Assumed office 1 January 2021
- Preceded by: Justin Valentin

Personal details
- Born: 10 June 1974 (age 52) Anse aux Pins, Mahé, Seychelles
- Education: University of Franche-Comté; University of Sorbonne Nouvelle Paris 3
- Profession: Linguist and educator

Joëlle Perreau (born 10 June 1974) is a Seychellois linguist who has served as the 5th Vice-Chancellor of the University of Seychelles since 1 January 2021.

== Career ==
After finishing secondary school, Perreau completed her two years of national service on Ste. Anne Island and in Port Launay (Mahé Island). She then studied for her O-Levels and A-Levels at the Seychelles Polytechnic in Anse Royale. As a student, Perreau originally wanted to become a psychologist, but later decided to study French teaching and linguistics. After completing her A-Levels in December 1994, she entered a 16-month teacher training program between Seychelles (7 months) and France (9 months).

Perreau then became a secondary school teacher. She alternately taught in Seychelles for 6 months, and studied in France for 6 months. She earned a Diplôme d'études approfondies in Linguistics, Didactics and Semiotics from the University of Franche-Comté in 2004. She then began a doctorate at the University of Sorbonne Nouvelle Paris 3.

Perreau joined the University of Seychelles at its inauguration in 2010. Initially working as a faculty member in linguistics, she joined the university administration in 2015, later becoming Dean of the Faculty. She became the Vice-Chancellor of the university on 1 January 2021, succeeding Justin Valentin.

== Family ==
Perreau was born on 10 June 1974. She is the daughter of Jocelyn and Michol Perreau. Her father Jocelyn was a singer from Mauritius who first came to the Seychelles on a band tour in 1972, where he met Michol. Perreau was raised in Anse aux Pins, and completed her primary and secondary schooling there as well. Her family remains close with relatives in Mauritius. She has one younger brother. Her father died in 2001.
