= Marina Confait =

Seychellois foreign affairs secretary

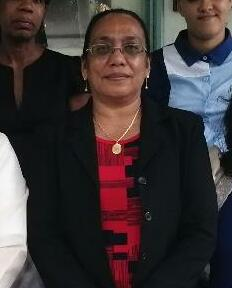
- Confait in 2019

2nd Vice-Chancellor of the University of Seychelles
- In office March 2012 – February 2014
- Preceded by: Rolph Payet
- Succeeded by: Dennis Hardy

Personal details
- Education: Katholieke Universiteit Brussel; Edith Cowan University
- Profession: civil servant

Marina Fatima Confait is a Seychellois retired civil servant. She was Vice-Chancellor of the University of Seychelles from March 2012 to February 2014, and as Principal Secretary of the Ministry of Foreign Affairs from 2019 to 2021.

== Biography ==
Confait's first role was in January 1977 as a secondary school teacher. She went on to work in a variety of ministries. She also was Chief Executive Officer of the National Human Resources Development Council (NHRDC). She studied at the Katholieke Universiteit Brussel, completing her degree in 1997.

In March 2012, she was appointed as Vice-Chancellor of the University of Seychelles. In February 2014, she resigned to pursue her PhD at Edith Cowan University, graduating in 2018.

In February 2019, Confait became the Principal Secretary in the Ministry of Foreign Affairs. She continued in this position until her retirement in 2021.

Educational offices
Preceded by Rolph Payet	Vice-Chancellor of University of Seychelles; 2012 to 2014	Succeeded by Dennis Hardy
