= 2024 in Seychelles =

- Decades: 2000s; 2010s; 2020s
- See also: Other events of 2024; Timeline of Seychellois history

Events in the year 2024 in Seychelles.

== Incumbents ==
- President: Wavel Ramkalawan
- Vice-President: Ahmed Afif

== Holidays ==
- 1 January – New Year's Day
- 2 January – New Year Holiday
- 29 March – Good Friday
- 30 March – Holy Saturday
- 1 April – Easter Monday
- 1 May – Labour Day
- 30 May – Corpus Christi
- 18 June – Constitution Day
- 29 June – National Day
- 15 August – Assumption Day
- 1 November – All Saints Day
- 8 December – Immaculate Conception
- 25 December – Christmas Day
