= 2017 in Seychelles =

- Decades: 1990s; 2000s; 2010s; 2020s
- See also: Other events of 2017; Timeline of Seychellois history

Events in the year 2017 in Seychelles.

== Incumbents ==
- President: Danny Faure

== Deaths ==
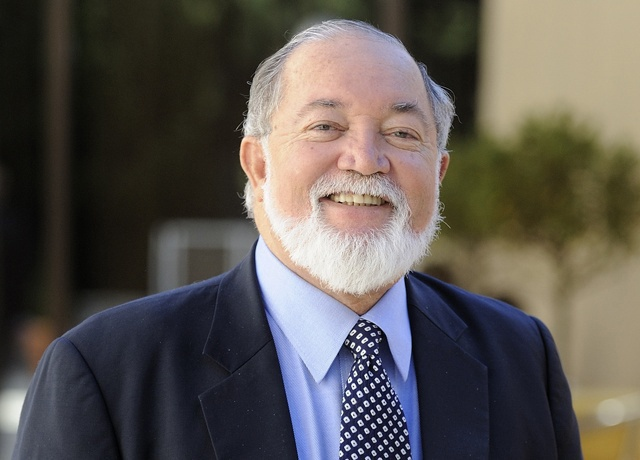
James Mancham was the 1st President of Seychelles.

- 8 January – James Mancham, politician, President of Seychelles (1976–1977) (b. 1939).
