= 2023 Mahé explosion =

Explosion in the Seychelles

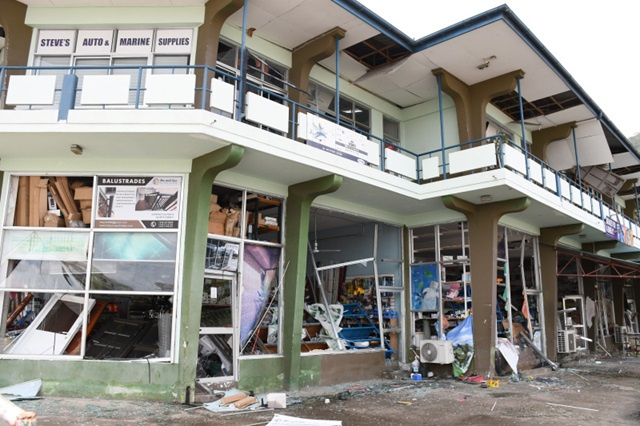
- A building damaged due to the explosion
- Date: 7 December 2023
- Time: 02:00 SCT (UTC+04:00)
- Location: Mahé, Seychelles; 04°39′27″S 55°29′07″E
- Injuries: 178

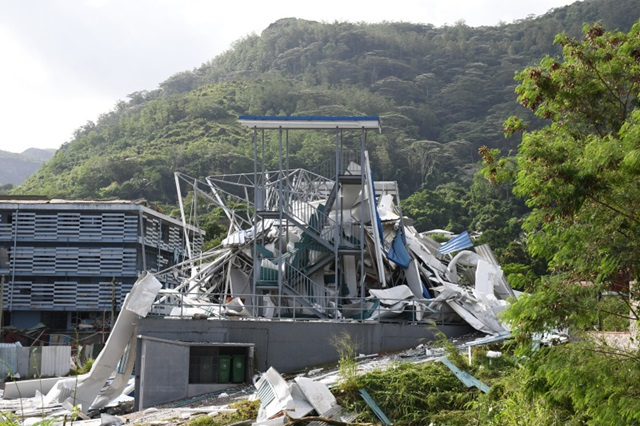
A building destroyed due to the explosion

An explosion occurred on 7 December 2023 at an explosives depot on the island of Mahé in the Seychelles, south of the capital Victoria. The blast damaged numerous structures. The explosion took place during heavy flooding in Seychelles that killed three people; a state of emergency was declared following both events.

== Background ==
Prior to the explosion, heavy rainfall in Seychelles caused extensive flooding that killed at least three people.

== Explosion ==
According to a statement issued by the president's office, the explosion occurred at a "CCCL explosives store" and caused "massive damage to the Providence Industrial area and the surrounding areas", located 7 kilometers southeast of the capital Victoria, with officials calling the area a "war zone".

The explosion was reported to have originated from four containers of explosives and had left a 13-meter deep crater. It also caused damage to Seychelles International Airport, four kilometers away, although the airport remained operational along with inter-island ferries. At least 178 people were injured, mostly suffering light injuries. Five people were hospitalized, with one of them in intensive care.

== Response ==
President Wavel Ramkalawan ordered non-essential workers to remain at home, while schools were closed and hospitals remained open only for emergency cases. 202 residents in the worst-affected district of Cascade were evacuated due to serious damage to homes. A state of emergency was declared on 7 December following the explosion and floods, but was lifted within the day.
