= Constitutional Court of Seychelles =

The Constitutional Court of Seychelles is a specialized and independent court in Seychelles. The court's primary role is to protect the civil rights of the people of Seychelles. It is presided by any three judges of the Supreme Court.
