= Patrick Pillay =

Seychellois politician (1949–2024)

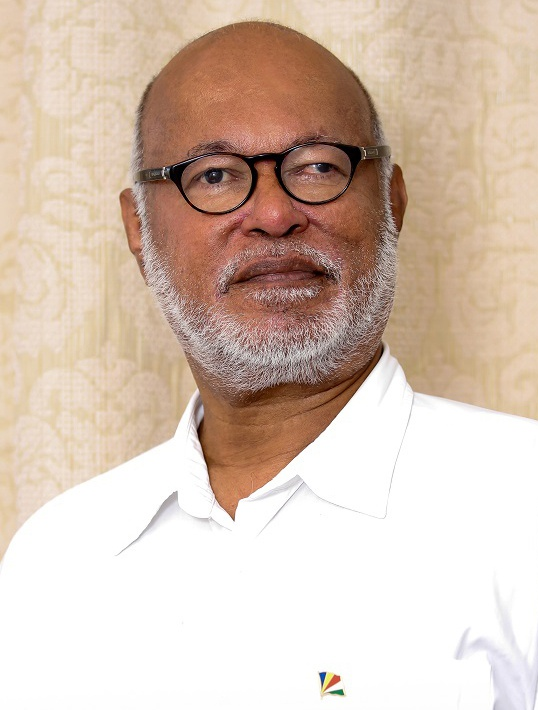
- Pillay in 2015

Speaker of the National Assembly of Seychelles
- In office 27 September 2016 – 29 January 2018
- Preceded by: Patrick Herminie
- Succeeded by: Nicholas Prea

Ministerial roles
- 1993–1998: Education and Culture
- 1998–1999: Youth and Culture
- 2000–2001: Industries and Business
- 2001–2005: Health
- 2005–2009: Foreign Affairs

Personal details
- Born: 12 March 1949
- Died: 20 December 2024 (aged 75) Victoria, Seychelles
- Party: Seychellois Alliance
- Other political affiliations: Seychelles People's Progressive Front/Parti Lepep (until 2015)
- Education: University of Warwick; University of Sussex

Patrick Georges Pillay (8 April 1949 – 19 December 2024) was a Seychellois politician who was the Speaker of the National Assembly of the Seychelles from 2016 to 2018. Previously he served as foreign minister and health minister. In 2010, he was appointed resident High Commissioner to the United Kingdom.

== Early life and career ==
Pillay was born on 8 April 1949 as the eighth of nine children. He studied at the University of Warwick and the University of Sussex in the 1970s and 1980s before returning to Seychelles. He joined the Seychelles People's Progressive Front, which at that time was Seychelles ruling party under the leadership of France-Albert René.

Pillay was appointed the Director of the Seychelles Polytechnic in September 1986, where he changed the semi-military culture of the polytechnic to a culture that emphasized the "wholesome and holistic development of the character of the young people". He also mandated that all formal teaching and student-lecturer interaction should be done in either French or English and introduced civic education in place of political education and forceful drill sessions. He was then appointed the principal secretary of the Ministry of Education.

== Ministerial career ==
Pillay was first appointed to the cabinet in 1993 as Minister for Education and Culture and served in the position for five years. He was successively appointed the Minister of Youth and Culture from 1998 to 1999 and Industries and Business from 2000 to 2001. As the Minister of Industries and Business, Pillay oversaw the development of the Seychellois offshore business sector, strengthen the authority of business, and developed a legal and administrative framework to support investment in the country. Pillay was then appointed health minister, serving from 2001 to 2005. Pillay was tasked by President Rene to resolve the political division between the pro-government and the pro-opposition staff at the health ministry.

In February 2005, Pillay was appointed the Minister of Foreign Affairs, replacing the outgoing Jérémie Bonnelame. Pillay instructed the gradual re-opening of Seychelles diplomatic missions, which in 2003 had been closed but two. Pillay also negotiated the country back into the membership of the Southern African Development Community in 2006 with a reduced membership fee and sought help from some of its larger states. Pillay relinquished his position on 15 September 2009, with President James Michel assuming his post temporarily.

== High commissioner and opposition leader ==
Pillay was appointed the high commissioner of Seychelles to the United Kingdom in January 2010, along with the re-opening of its diplomatic mission in the country. He presented his credentials to Queen Elizabeth II on 30 March 2010. He retired in 2012 but continued to take part in Seychelles diplomacy and assisted the foreign ministry in its 2017 United Nations Security Council membership campaign. Pillay left the ruling People's Party (a rename of the Seychelles People's Progressive Front) in April 2015 when he announced the formation of his own party, Seychellois Alliance, backed by several former ministers. His party was registered in May 2015 and he ran as a candidate for the 2015 Seychellois presidential election. He placed third in the election with 14.19% of the votes and failed to qualify for the second round of the election.

Standing in the September 2016 parliamentary election as a candidate of the opposition Linyon Demokratik Seselwa (LDS) coalition in Anse Boileau, located on Mahé, Pillay won a seat in the National Assembly. The LDS won a majority of parliamentary seats, and Pillay was elected as Speaker of the National Assembly on 27 September 2016. Pillay resigned on 29 January 2018 from both the position as Speaker and member of the national assembly and Philip Arrisol won the seat in the resulting by-election.

In May 2021, Lalyans Seselwa was dissolved by The Seychelles Electoral Commission due to non-compliance with the Political Parties Act. Pillay, who did not contest the decision, stated that the party had achieved its political goals of removing United Seychelles (a rename of the People's Party) from power and the election of an opposition.

== Death ==
Pillay died on 19 December 2024, at the age of 75. Prior to his death, Pillay was admitted to hospital following a stroke.
