= Sebastien Pillay =

Seychelles politician

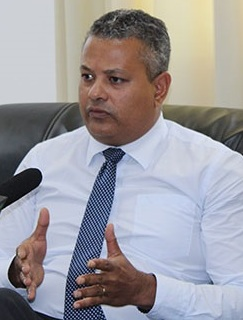
- Pillay in 2020

6th Vice President of Seychelles
- Incumbent
- Assumed office 28 October 2025
- President: Patrick Herminie
- Preceded by: Ahmed Afif

Leader of the Opposition
- In office 28 October 2020 – 28 October 2025
- Preceded by: Wavel Ramkalawan
- Succeeded by: Bernard Georges

Member of the National Assembly
- In office 2011 – 28 October 2025
- Constituency: Proportional list

Personal details
- Born: 26 January 1978 (age 48) Seychelles
- Party: United Seychelles
- Education: Edith Cowan University; University of Warwick

Sebastien Pillay (born 26 January 1978) is a Seychellois politician who is the Vice President of Seychelles. He has served as Leader of the Opposition in the National Assembly since 28 October 2020 and was elected as Vice President of Seychelles as the Running Mate of Patrick Herminie in October 2025.

== Biography ==
Sebastien Pillay was born on 26 January 1978. He is of Tamil descent. He received a Bachelor of Education (2004) from Edith Cowan University and a Master of Arts in Educational Leadership & Innovation (2008) from the University of Warwick. Pillay first worked as a mathematics teacher. After receiving promotions within the Department of Education, he then became a Lecturer at the University of Seychelles.

Pillay was first nominated as a proportionally elected Member of Seychelles National Assembly in 2011, and subsequently re-nominated in 2016 and 2020, serving throughout each term as a list candidate and not as an elected district representative on the United Seychelles list. He was sworn in as the Leader of the Opposition for the Assembly term beginning 28 October 2020.

Pillay was a member of the Electoral Assessment Mission for the 2015 United Kingdom general election.

In 2025, Hon. Sebastien Pillay was selected as the Running Mate of Patrick Herminie, representing the United Seychelles Party in the 2025 Presidential Election. After two rounds of voting, the party emerged victorious with 52.7% of the votes.

Pillay was sworn in as Vice President of Seychelles on 28 October 2025.

== Areas of Responsibility ==
- Department of Digital Transformation/Digital Governance
- Department of Information
- Department of Lands
- Department of Housing
- Seychelles Infrastructure Agency
- Poverty Alleviation
- Department of Risk and Disaster Management
