= 2025 Seychellois general election =

- Presidential election
- 25–27 September 2025 (first round); 9–11 October 2025 (second round)
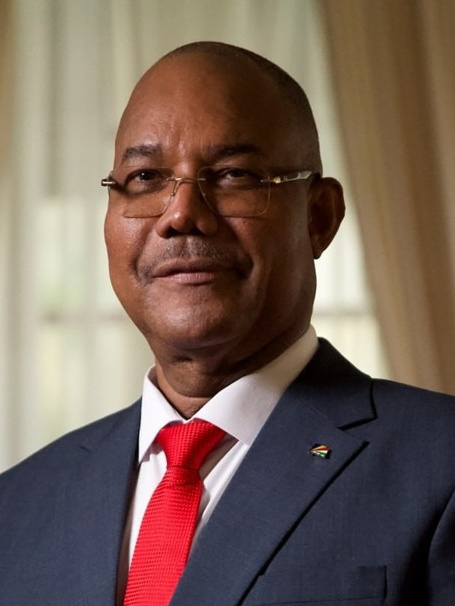

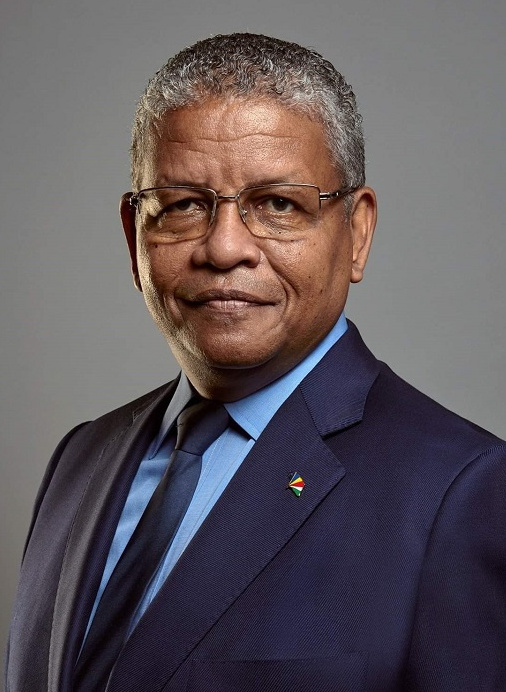
Nominee	Patrick Herminie	Wavel Ramkalawan
Party	US	LDS
Running mate	Sebastien Pillay	Ahmed Afif
Popular vote	34,389	30,823
Percentage	52.73%	47.27%
President before election
Wavel Ramkalawan
LDS
Elected President
Patrick Herminie
US
- Parliamentary election
- 25–27 September 2025
- All seats in the National Assembly; 18 seats needed for a majority
Party	Leader	Vote %	Seats	+/–
US	Patrick Herminie	49.14	19	+9
LDS	Wavel Ramkalawan	44.81	15	−10
This lists parties that won seats. See the complete results below.
Results by constituency

General elections were held in Seychelles on 27 September 2025 to elect a president and members of the National Assembly, with a second round of the presidential election held from 9 to 11 October after no candidate received a majority of the vote in the first round.

The presidential election resulted in a victory for Patrick Herminie of the United Seychelles Party, who received 53% of the vote. Incumbent president Wavel Ramkalawan of the Linyon Demokratik Seselwa finished second with 47% of the vote.

== Electoral system ==
The president of Seychelles is elected using the two-round system; if no candidate receives a majority of the vote in the first round, a second round is held between the top two candidates.

Members of the National Assembly are elected by two methods; 26 (with a new constituency established in 2020) are elected from single-member constituencies using first-past-the-post voting, and up to a further ten are elected based on the percentage of votes received by each party; for each 10% of the total national vote received, a party gets one additional seat.

== Candidates ==
=== For president ===
==== On the ballot ====
- Wavel Ramkalawan (Linyon Demokratik Seselwa), running mate Ahmed Afif
- Patrick Herminie (United Seychelles), running mate Sebastien Pillay
- Maarco Francis (Seychelles United Movement)
- Alain St Ange (Lalyans Nouvo Sesel)
- Kisna Louise (Independent)
- Robert Moumou (Seychelles People's National Movement)
- Ralph Volcère (Independent)
- Charles De Clarisse (Independent)

==== Withdrawn ====
- Vincent Padayachy (Laliberte)
- Regis Francourt (Independent)
- Marco Kastner (Independent)

== Campaign ==
Herminie and his United Seychelles party pledged to revert the retirement age down to 63, reduce bus fares by 40% and increase social security benefits. Ralph Volcère pledged to decriminalize recreational cannabis as part of efforts to reduce the rate of drug addiction and put drug lords out of business. Another key issue in the election was the Ramkalawan administration's decision to lease large areas of Assumption Island, near the World Heritage Site and marine reserve of Aldabra, for 70 years to a Qatari-built luxury hotel chain, which triggered protests over environmental damage. This led Herminie to accuse Qatar of financing Ramkalawan's campaign and pledging to cancel the lease agreement.

== Conduct ==
Early voting for elderly and essential workers was held on 25 September. More than 77,000 people were eligible to vote. For the second round, voting was held for outlying islands and some essential workers on 9 October, while voting in the country's three main islands was held on 11 October.

== Results ==
=== President ===
Patrick Herminie placed first in both rounds, winning 49% and 53% of the vote respectively.

Candidate	Party	First round		Second round	
Candidate	Party	Votes	%	Votes	%
Patrick Herminie	United Seychelles	30,736	48.83	34,389	52.73
Wavel Ramkalawan	Linyon Demokratik Seselwa	29,230	46.44	30,823	47.27
Maarco Francis	Seychelles United Movement	1,329	2.11		
Robert Moumou	Seychelles People's National Movement	593	0.94		
Alain St Ange	Lalyans Nouvo Sesel	513	0.82		
Charles De Clarisse	Independent	253	0.40		
Ralph Volcère	Independent	217	0.34		
Kisna Louise	Independent	68	0.11		
Total		62,939	100.00	65,212	100.00
Valid votes		62,939	97.11	65,212	97.59
Invalid/blank votes		1,870	2.89	1,607	2.41
Total votes		64,809	100.00	66,819	100.00
Registered voters/turnout		77,045	84.12	77,045	86.73
Source: ECS

=== National Assembly ===
Party	Votes	%	Seats			
Party	Votes	%	FPTP	PR	Total	+/−
United Seychelles	30,880	49.14	15	4	19	+9
Linyon Demokratik Seselwa	28,159	44.81	11	4	15	−10
Seychelles United Movement	1,316	2.09	0	0	0	New
Lalyans Nouvo Sesel	852	1.36	0	0	0	New
Mouvman Lavwa Seselwa	700	1.11	0	0	0	New
Seychelles People's National Movement	326	0.52	0	0	0	New
Laliberté	190	0.30	0	0	0	New
Independents	414	0.66	0	0	0	0
Total	62,837	100.00	26	8	34	−1
Valid votes	62,837	96.99				
Invalid/blank votes	1,950	3.01				
Total votes	64,787	100.00				
Registered voters/turnout	77,045	84.09				
Source: ECS
