= University of Seychelles =

Public university in Mahé, Seychelles

Coordinates: 4.7404°S 55.5164°E

- Other name: Liniversite Sesel
- Motto: Lavenir dan ou lanmen
- Motto in English: The Future in Your Hands
- Established: 17 September 2009; 16 years ago
- Affiliations: Association of Commonwealth Universities
- Chancellor: Wavel Ramkalawan
- Vice-Chancellor: Joëlle Perreau
- Location: Anse Royale and Mont Fleuri, Seychelles
- Colours: Red and White
- Nickname: Unisey
- Website: unisey.ac.sc

The University of Seychelles, informally also called UniSey, is the primary institution of higher education in Seychelles.

== History ==
The university was established on 17 September 2009. There are two campuses: the main campus at Anse Royale and the Mont Fleuri campus offering information technology programs.

In 2014, the university announced a partnership for collaboration and student exchanges with Gibraltar, which was developing its own first university. The university also participates in the Commonwealth of Learning, the Pan-African e-Network project and the Agence universitaire de la Francophonie.

== Chancellors ==
- James Michel 2009 – 2021
- Wavel Ramkalawan 2022 – present

== Vice-Chancellors ==
- Rolph Payet 2009–2012
- Marina Confait 2012–2014
- Dennis Hardy 2014–2017
- Justin Valentin 2018–2020
- Joëlle Perreau 2021–present

== See also ==
- List of universities in Seychelles
- Education in Seychelles
