= Joevana Charles =

Seychellois politician (1955–2021)

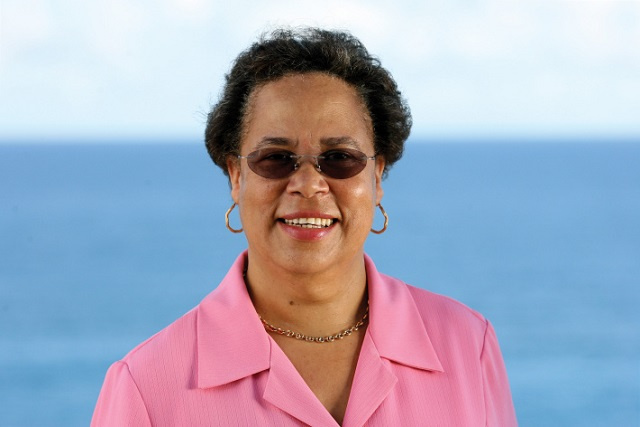

Personal details
- Born: July 1955
- Died: 17 January 2021 (aged 65)
- Occupation: Politician

Joevana Charles (July 1955 – 17 January 2021) was a member of the National Assembly of Seychelles. She was a member of the Seychelles People's Progressive Front, and was first elected to the Assembly in 1993.

== Early life and career ==
Charles was born in July 1955 as the fifth of eight children. As both of her parents worked abroad, Charles took the role of caring and teaching his brothers and sisters as well as managing their education. His brother, Flavien Joubert, described her as a "party girl" who partied at various places in Seychelles clubs every Saturday before she was married.

Charles started her career as a teacher. She later attended the National Teachers Training College and went for further study abroad at the Moscow State Institute of International Relations.

== Political career ==
Joevana began her political career following the introduction of the multiparty system in Seychelles in 1993. She joined the Seychelles People's United Party and ran as a candidate from the Plaisance constituency in that year's election. She won the election and ran again in the next election, this time as a candidate from the Roche Caiman constituency. She was reelected and retained the seat in the 2002, 2007, and 2011 election. She ended her term as MP in 2016.

During her tenure in the National Assembly of Seychelles, Joevana served as a member of the Standing Order Committee and the Member of the Women’s Parliamentary Committee. In July 2011, Charles was appointed by President James Michel, as a member of the National Committee for Social Renaissance, a committee that was made to steer the national dialogue which the President.

Joevana died at her residence on 17 January 2021. She is survived by two children and grandchildren.
