= Nancy Marie =

Seychellois supercentenarian (1909–2021)

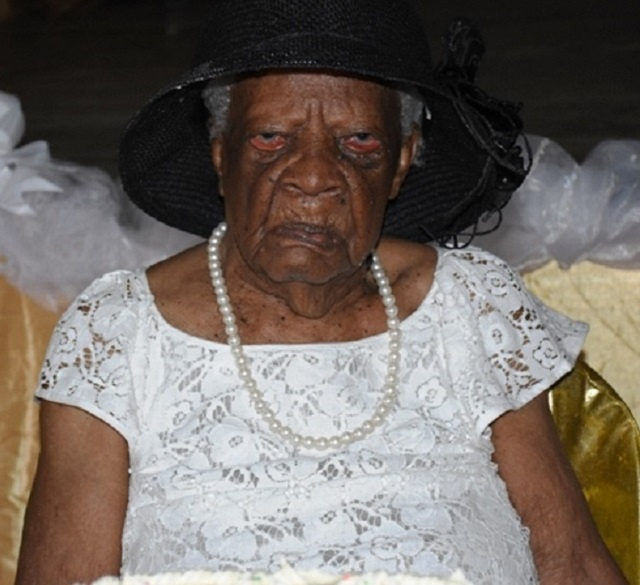
- Born: 26 January 1909; Praslin Island, Seychelles
- Died: 11 May 2021 (aged 112); La Rivière Anglaise, Mahé, Seychelles
- Known for: Oldest person in Seychelles

Nancy Marie (26 January 1909 – 11 May 2021) was a Seychellois woman who was the oldest living woman in the Seychelles. According to statements made during her lifetime, she was born on 26 January 1909, and is said to have been 112 years old. If her age is correct, she would be considered the oldest person in Seychellois history, surpassing the age of Irene Amery, who died in 1996.

== Biography ==
Nancy Marie is said to have been born on 26 January 1909 on the island of Praslin in the Seychelles. She was from a family of long-lived people, including her mother, Elisabelle, who lived to the age of 103. She spent most of her youth on Praslin, where she worked on plantations harvesting coconuts to turn them into palm oil.

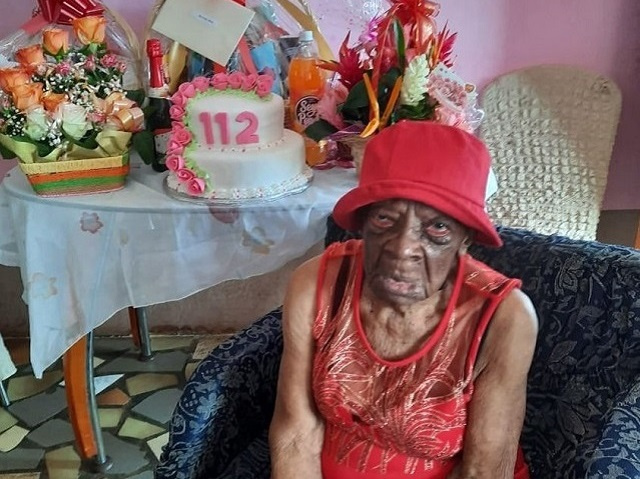
Nancy celebrates her 112th birthday.

At the time of her 108th birthday, she was survived by her children Guy, 66, and Anne, 63, as well as 11 great-grandchildren.

She died on 11 May 2021, on the island of Mahé, at the age of 112 years and 105 days.
