= Seychelles News Agency =

State news agency of Seychelles

Agency overview
- Formed: 2014; 12 years ago
- Dissolved: 2024
- Jurisdiction: Government of Seychelles
- Headquarters: Victoria
- Parent department: Department of Information
- Website: www.seychellesnewsagency.com

The Seychelles News Agency (SNA) is the state news agency of Seychelles. It's headquartered in Victoria and regulated by the Seychelles Media Commission. It ceased operations in December 2024, but resumed activity in January 2026.

== History ==
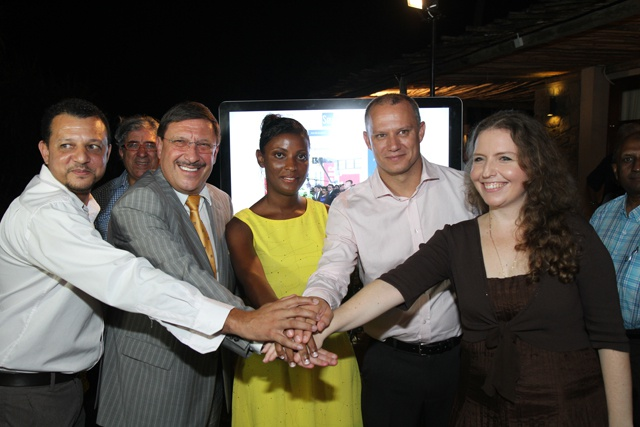
Launch of the Seychelles News Agency, April 2014

Launched on 22 April 2014 during the opening of the biennial Seychelles honorary consuls conference held at the Kempinski Resort at Baie Lazare, the SNA is the Seychelles' first online news agency service. It provides daily news service in English and French languages. Most of the SNA's text and photos are free to be published or redistributed so long the agency and author are credited.
