= Perseverance Island, Seychelles =

Perseverance Island
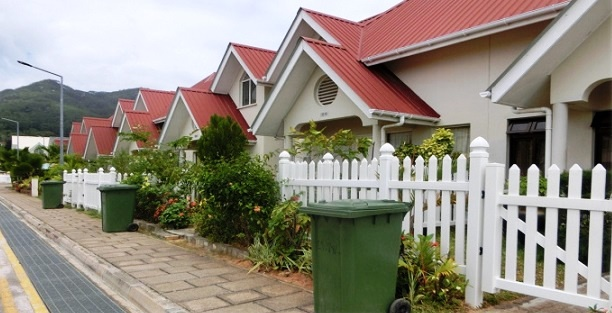

- Location within Seychelles

Geography
- Location: Seychelles, Indian Ocean
- Coordinates: 4.605°S 55.465°E
- Archipelago: Inner Islands, Seychelles
- Adjacent to: Indian Ocean
- Area: 0.99 km^{2} (0.38 sq mi)
- Length: 1.4 km (0.87 mi)
- Width: 1.0 km (0.62 mi)
- Coastline: 5.3 km (3.29 mi)
- Highest elevation: 5 m (16 ft)

Administration
- Seychelles
- Group: Granitic Seychelles
- Sub-Group: Mahe Islands
- Sub-Group: Mahe Port Islands
- Districts: Ile Perseverance I, Ile Perseverance II

Demographics
- Ethnic groups: Creole, French, East Africans, Indians.

Additional information
- Time zone: SCT (UTC+4)
- ISO code: SC-26, SC-27

Perseverance Island (French: Ile Perseverance) is an artificial island in Seychelles, lying 2 km from the capital Victoria.

== History ==
The island was created artificially during the 2000s. It belongs to the Mahe Port Islands, which are mostly artificial islands created by funds from Dubai when the Dubai dredger was placed in Seychelles. In 2013 work on the island had begun. By 2020, the island should house 10,000, more than 15% of the population of Seychelles.

== Administration ==
Perseverance Island is administered as the districts Ile Perseverance I and Ile Perseverance II.

Official emblem of Perseverance

== Tourism ==
The island's plan is mostly residential. There is a large Army Naval base at the south point.
