= Seychellois Alliance =

Political party in Seychelles

Seychellois Alliance Lalyans Seselwa
- Leader: Patrick Pillay
- Founded: April 2015; 10 years ago
- Dissolved: May 2021; 4 years ago

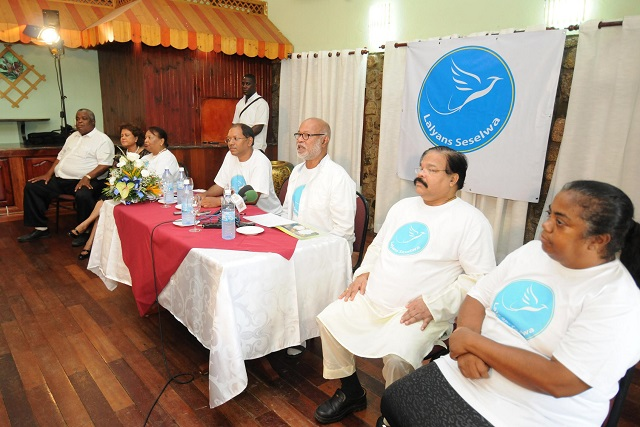
Meeting of the party members in 2015

The Seychellois Alliance or Lalyans Seselwa was a political party in Seychelles.

The party was founded in April 2015 as a split from the ruling Parti Lepep. Its founder Patrick Pillay was a senior member of Parti Lepep. After Pillay contested the 2015 presidential election on the Lalyans Seselwa ticket, the party formed the Linyon Demokratik Seselwa coalition with other opposition parties ahead of the 2016 legislative elections.

Lalyans Seselwa left the Linyon Demokratik Seselwa coalition in February 2018. Pillay's candidacy for the 2020 presidential election was rejected due to a lack of signatures. The party then endorsed incumbent Danny Faure. For the legislative elections, Lalyans Seselwa nominated candidates in three districts, and endorsed United Seychelles in the other districts. The party did not win any seats.

The registration of Lalyans Seselwa was cancelled in May 2021 for not having a physical address and Executive Committee. Pillay did not contest, saying that the party had achieved its goals.
