= Alexia Amesbury =

Seychellois lawyer and politician

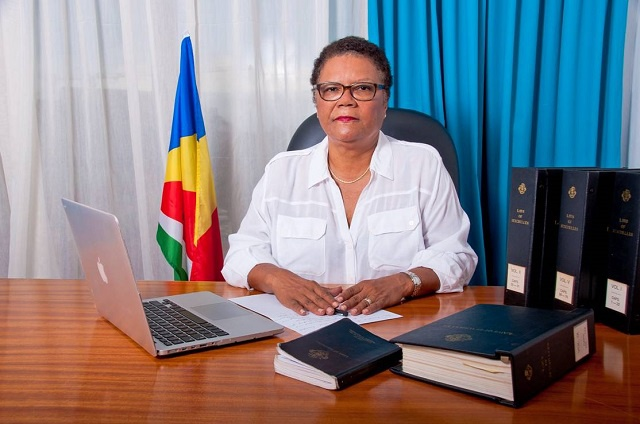
- Alexcia Amesbury in 2015
- Born: Alexia G. Jumeau; 1951 (age 74–75); Praslin, Mahé, Seychelles
- Education: London School of Economics
- Occupations: lawyer; activist; politician
- Political party: Seychelles Party for Social Justice and Democracy

Alexia Amesbury (born c. 1951, née Jumeau) is a Seychellois politician and a lawyer by profession. Under the umbrella of the Seychelles Party for Social Justice and Democracy, she contested in the 2015 presidential election to become the first woman to contest a Seychellois presidential election.

== Early life ==
Amesbury was born at Praslin, Mahé, Seychelles and grew up in the St. Elizabeth's Convent in Seychelles until she moved to Kenya in 1961 where she completed her O' and A'levels.

== Education ==
At the age of 37, she matriculated at a University in the United Kingdom to study Law before proceeding to the London School of Economics and Political Science where a master's degree in International Law.

== Career ==
In 2015, she became the first woman to contest in a Seychellois presidential election after she represented the Seychelles Party for Social Justice and Democracy during the 2015 presidential election. She received a total of 803 votes in the first round. While Amesbury did not advance to the second round of voting, she supported Wavel Ramkalawan in the run-off election.

== Controversy ==
After James Michel won the 2015 election, Amesbury believed that the results were invalid based on Seychelles's Constitution. Amesbury explained that according to the Constitution of Seychelles, the fifth section of Schedule 3 states that a candidate in Seychelles cannot be elected president unless they receive more than half of the votes during the election.

== Personal life ==
In 1972, she married an Englishman with whom she had six children. The couple divorced in 1998.
