= Ahmed Afif =

Vice President of Seychelles from 2020 to 2025

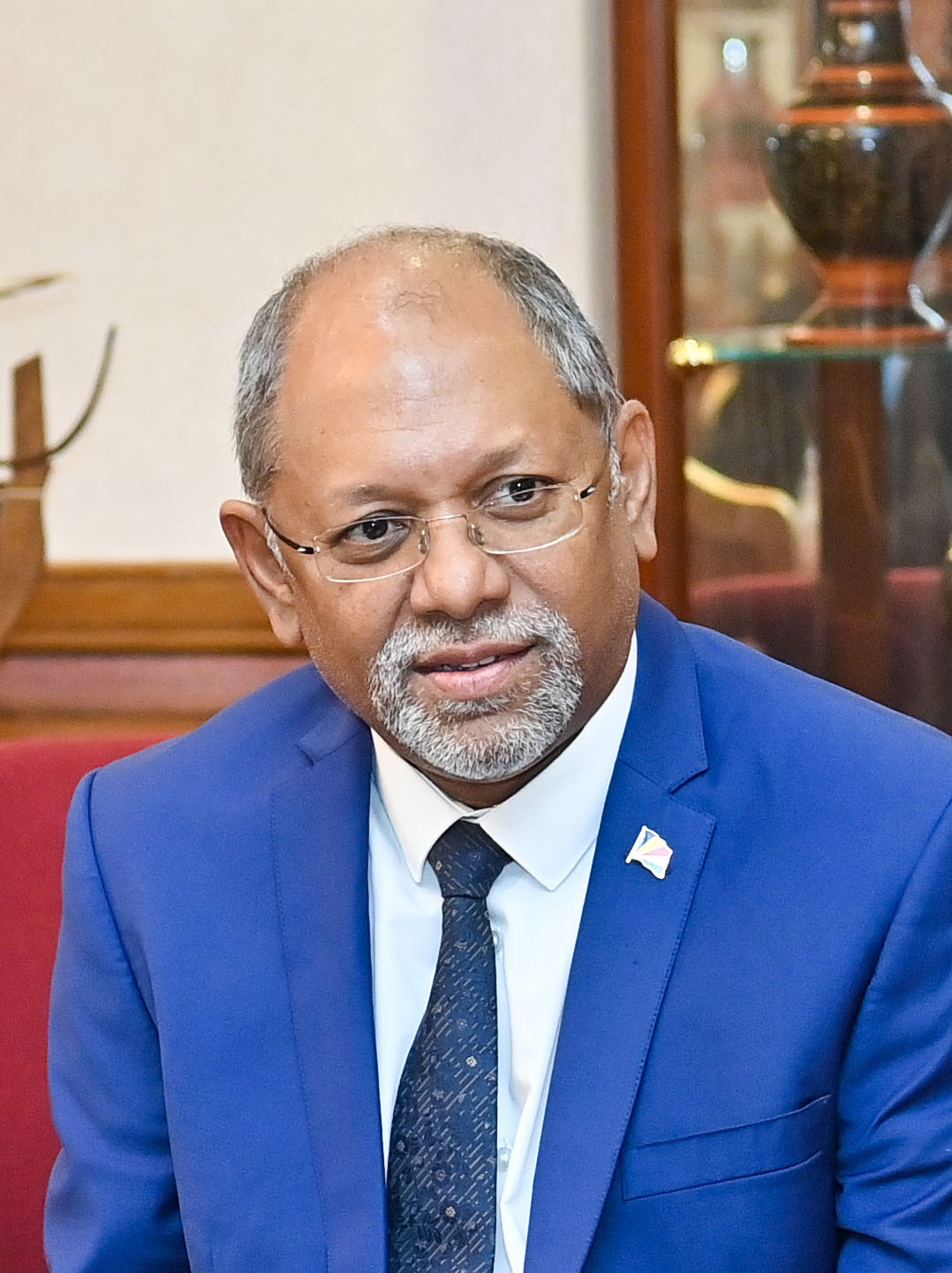
- Afif in 2023

5th Vice President of Seychelles
- In office 27 October 2020 – 26 October 2025
- President: Wavel Ramkalawan
- Preceded by: Vincent Meriton
- Succeeded by: Sebastien Pillay

Personal details
- Born: 6 January 1967 (age 59)
- Party: Linyon Demokratik Seselwa
- Parent(s): Abdullah Afif; Aneesa Ali
- Occupation: Politician

Ahmed Afif (born 6 January 1967) is a Maldivian-Seychellois politician and banker who served as the Vice President of Seychelles from 2020 to 2025.

== Biography ==
Ahmed Afif was born in Mahé in the Seychelles as the son Abdulla Afif and Aneesa Ali. He is of Maldivian descent; his father was the President of the United Suvadive Republic from 1959 to 1963. Afif graduated from Warwick University in Maths, Operational Research, Statistics and Economics. He had served as chairman of NouvoBanq Seychelles and Seychelles Savings Bank.

He was first elected to the National Assembly in 2006 for the Anse Etoile Constituency. In 2015, he joined the Seychellois Alliance as the running mate of Patrick Pillay in the 2015 presidential election. In 2016, the Seychellois Alliance joined Linyon Demokratik Seselwa for the 2016 election. In 2018, Afif was elected the Deputy Speaker of Seychelles' National Assembly.

On 27 October 2020, after the LDS won the 2020 Seychellois general election, Afif was sworn in as vice-president. On 4 November 2020, the portfolios of Information and Information Communication Technology were assigned to Afif.

Political offices
Preceded by Vincent Meriton	Vice President of Seychelles; 2020–2025	Succeeded by Sebastien Pillay
