= 2016 Seychellois parliamentary election =

- 8–10 September 2016

All seats in the National Assembly
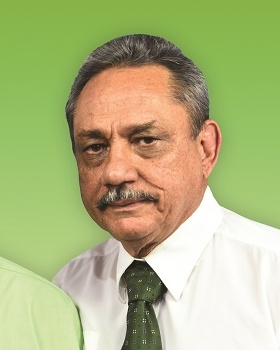

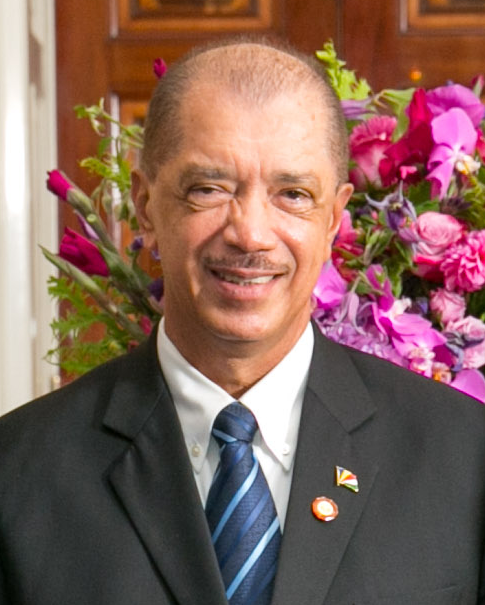
	First party	Second party
Leader	Roger Mancienne	James Michel
Party	LDS	PP
Last election	–	88.56%, 31 seats
Seats won	19	14
Seat change	New	▼17
Popular vote	30,444	30,218
Percentage	49.59%	49.22%
Swing	New	▼39.34pp
- Results by constituency

Parliamentary elections were held in Seychelles from 8 to 10 September 2016. Three parties and three independent candidates ran for the 25 directly-elected seats. The result was a victory for the opposition Linyon Demokratik Seselwa alliance, which won 19 of the 33 seats. It was the first time since the 1979 elections that the People's Party did not win a majority of seats.

== Electoral system ==
Members of the National Assembly are elected by two methods; 25 are elected from single-member constituencies using first-past-the-post voting, and up to a further ten are elected based on the percentage of votes received by each party; for each 10% of the total national vote received, a party gets one additional seat.

== Campaign ==
The four main opposition parties (the Seychelles National Party, the Seychellois Alliance, the Seychelles Party for Social Justice and Democracy and the Seychelles United Party) formed a coalition, Linyon Demokratik Seselwa (LDS) in order to contest the elections, having boycotted the 2011 elections, which saw the People's Party win all 31 seats.

The Seychelles Patriotic Movement nominated 23 candidates for the 25 constituency seats, whilst three independent candidates also ran.

== Conduct ==
Two international observer groups were present during the election, the Southern African Development Community (SADC) and the African Union (AU). The SADC observer team of 19 members hailed from eight SADC member countries and covered all 25 constituencies. The AU sent a historic observer team of women-only observers, led by Fatuma Ndangiza, present in the country from 1 to 15 September.

Two local observer groups, the Citizens Democracy Watch Seychelles (CDWS) and the Association for Rights, Information, and Democracy (ARID) also provided feedback.

== Results ==
Party	Votes	%	Seats			
Party	Votes	%	FPTP	PR	Total	+/–
Linyon Demokratik Seselwa	30,444	49.59	15	4	19	New
People's Party	30,218	49.22	10	4	14	–19
Seychelles Patriotic Movement	602	0.98	0	0	0	New
Independents	128	0.21	0	0	0	0
Total	61,392	100.00	25	8	33	–1
Valid votes	61,392	97.54				
Invalid/blank votes	1,547	2.46				
Total votes	62,939	100.00				
Registered voters/turnout	71,932	87.50				
Source: Electoral Commission
