= COVID-19 pandemic in Seychelles =

Aspect of viral disease pandemic

- Disease: COVID-19
- Pathogen: SARS-CoV-2
- Location: Seychelles
- First outbreak: Wuhan, China
- Index case: Perseverance Island
- Arrival date: 11 March 2020 (6 years, 5 months, 1 week and 3 days)
- Confirmed cases: 51,899 (updated 5 August 2026)
- Deaths: 172 (updated 5 August 2026)

Government website
- http://www.health.gov.sc/

The COVID-19 pandemic in Seychelles was a part of the worldwide pandemic of coronavirus disease 2019 (COVID-19) caused by severe acute respiratory syndrome coronavirus 2 (SARS-CoV-2). The COVID-19 pandemic was confirmed to have reached Seychelles in March 2020.

The country remained on 11 total cases from 18 May to 27 June 2020, with no active cases recorded in that period, but cases have been increasing rapidly since then. The country recorded its first COVID-19-related death on 3 January 2021.

According to the National Bureau of Statistics, life expectancy at birth decreased from 77.3 years in 2020 to 73.5 years in 2022 as a consequence of the pandemic.

As of 19 March 2023, a total of 224,020 vaccine doses have been administered.

== Timeline ==
=== March 2020 ===
Seychelles reported its first two cases of COVID-19 on 14 March 2020. The two cases were people who were in contact with someone in Italy who tested positive.

On 15 March, a third case arriving from the Netherlands was confirmed.

As of 16 March, there are four confirmed cases. The new case also arriving from Netherlands.

At the end of March ten persons had tested positive and were active cases.

=== April 2020 ===
On 6 April, there are 11 confirmed cases, and two patients have been released.

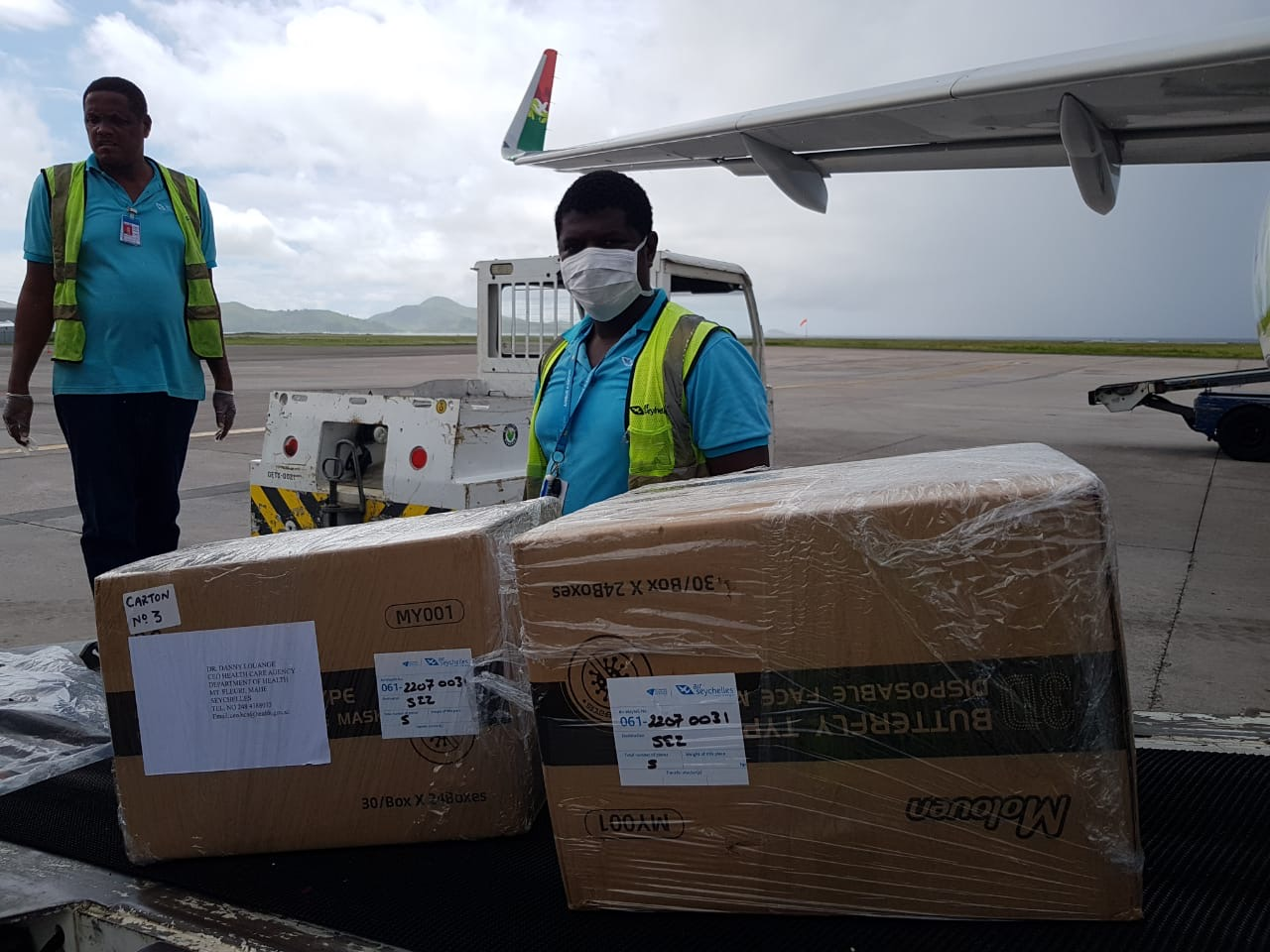
The U.S. Embassy in Mauritius and Seychelles and U.S. Africa Command donated 2900 KN95 masks and 200 face shields to the Seychelles Department of Health, April 2020.

By the end of April the number of confirmed cases remained 11 while four more patients had recovered, leaving five active cases.

=== May 2020 ===
In May 2020, the Seychelles government declared the country free of COVID-19. By 18 May all 11 previously confirmed cases had recovered and there were no active cases.

=== June 2020 ===
On 28 June there were 59 positive tests, followed by 7 positive tests on 29 June and 4 on 30 June. From the start of the outbreak in March to the end of June there were 81 confirmed cases and 11 recoveries, leaving 70 active cases. All 70 had previously tested negative in Abidjan or Dakar but positive on arrival in Seychelles.

=== July 2020 ===
Thirteen new cases were reported on 7 July, bringing the total number of confirmed cases to 94. All 13 patients were foreign nationals. The following day six locals tested positive, bringing the number of confirmed cases to 100. By 22 July all six local patients had recovered. By the end of the month the number of confirmed cases had risen to 114, up by 33 from June. The number of recovered patients grew from 11 to 39, leaving 75 active cases at the end of the month: an increase by 7% from the end of June.

=== August 2020 ===
By 4 August all infected nationals had recovered and there was only one remaining active case among the 109 foreign nationals who had previously tested positive. On 10 August a United Nations volunteer arriving from Nigeria tested positive, bringing the total number of confirmed cases to 127. Five more positive tests among arriving Spanish seafarers were announced on 17 August, bringing the total number of confirmed cases to 132 and the number of active cases to 6. Three more positive tests were announced on 25 August, bringing the total number of confirmed cases to 136 and the number of active cases to 9. During the month 22 new cases were confirmed while 88 infected patients recovered.

=== September 2020 ===
Two passengers arriving from Dubai on 3 September subsequently tested positive, as did another passenger arriving from Dubai on 4 September.

A confirmed case on Praslin was reported on 14 September, as was the death of a Praslin resident with possible links to that case. The death was subsequently found not to be COVID-19 related.

Two more cases were detected on 18 September. Another passenger arriving from Dubai on 21 September tested positive on arrival. During the month there were eight new cases, bringing the total number of confirmed cases to 144. At the end of the month there were three active cases.

=== October 2020 ===
Two passengers arriving from India on 22 September tested positive on 2 and 3 October respectively, bringing the total number of positive cases to 146. Two more cases were reported on 5 October, bringing the total number to 148. One more case was reported on 15 October, bringing the total number to 149. Four more cases were confirmed on 21 and 22 October, bringing the total number to 153. Two more cases were reported on 29 October, bringing the total number to 155. During the month there were 11 new cases. Four cases were still active at the end of the month.

=== November 2020 ===
Two passengers arriving from the UK tested positive on the fifth day after their arrival, bringing the total number of cases to 157 on 3 November. Another case was announced on 5 November, bringing the total number of cases to 158. Two more cases were reported on 12 November, bringing the total number of cases to 160. Three more cases reported on 19 November brought the total number to 163. On 21 November there were three more cases, bringing the total number of confirmed cases to 166. By 26 November there had been five more cases, raising the total number of confirmed cases to 171. The following day two more cases were announced, bringing the total number of cases to 173. On 30 November the total number of confirmed cases jumped to 183. During the month there were 28 new cases, eleven of which still active at the end of the month.

=== Subsequent cases ===
- 2020 cases

There were 275 confirmed cases in 2020. At the end of 2020 there were 44 active cases. Seven of the 275 cases were from a private yacht which arrived on 13 December.

- 2021 cases

Nearly ten months after the first case, the first death occurred on 3 January.

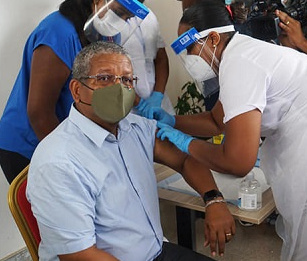
President of Seychelles Wavel Ramkalawan receiving a COVID-19 vaccine, January 2021

Seychelles launched its mass vaccination campaign on 10 January, initially with 50.000 doses of the Sinopharm BIBP vaccine donated by the United Arab Emirates. The UAE undertook to donate 20.000 more doses of a different vaccine to Seychelles.

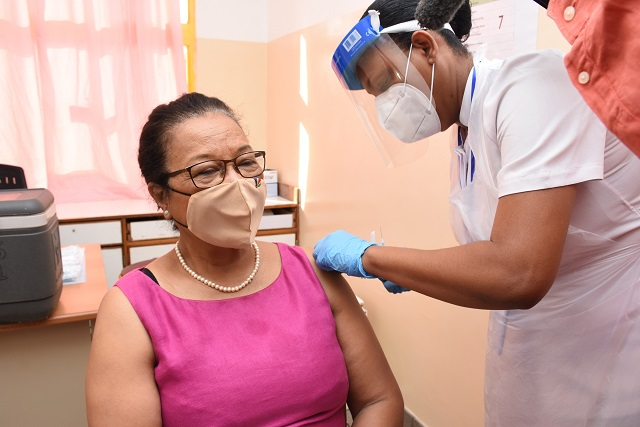
Seychellois Minister of Health Peggy Vidot being vaccinated against COVID-19, January 2021

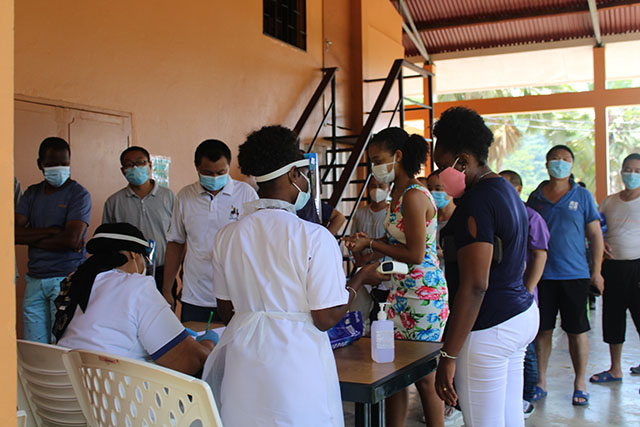
COVID-19 vaccination center in Seychelles, January 2021

50.000 doses of AstraZeneca's Covishield vaccine donated by India were delivered to Seychelles. On 3 April, Seychelles received 1,000 doses of the Sputnik V vaccine.

At the end of 2021 the total number of cases stood at 24,788 of which 621 were active and 134 had died.

Modelling by WHO's Regional Office for Africa suggests that due to under-reporting, the true number of infections by the end of 2021 was around 75524 while the true number of COVID-19 deaths was around 136.

- 2022 cases

By the end of the year the number of cases rose to 50665 while the number of active cases decreased to 41. The death toll rose to 172.

- 2023 cases

By the end of the year the number of cases rose to 51220 while the death toll remained unchanged.

== Statistics ==
=== Confirmed new cases per day ===
Confirmed cases 14 March 2020 - 29 August 2021.

=== Confirmed deaths per day ===
Confirmed deaths 14 March 2020 - 29 August 2021.

== Government response ==
=== Travel restrictions ===
On 9 March 2020, Seychelles ahead of the planned arrival of the Norwegian Spirit announced a temporary closing for cruise ships.

On 9 March 2020, Seychelles banned any person from Seychelles from travelling to China, South Korea, Italy, and Iran. An exception is made for returning residents.

A 26-year-old man, working at Seychelles International Airport, tested positive for coronavirus on Monday, 6 April, bringing the country's total number of infections to 11, Following the detection of this infection, a travel ban order came into effect at midnight on Wednesday 8 April in Seychelles, except for essential service workers. This measure will be maintained for 21 days.

In March, the Seychelles International Airport was closed. It opened again to scheduled traffic on 1 August 2020. On 28 April 2020, former President Danny Faure announced a lifting of some of the measures that were earlier on put in place to forestall further spread of the pandemic. All restrictions on the movement of people were lifted on 4 May. All shops were allowed to open until 20:00 from 4 May 2020. The first schools re-opened on 11 May and on 18 May 2020, all schools will re-opened. Travel restrictions ended on 1 June 2020 when the airport reopened.

Air Seychelles resumed domestic flights on 4 May 2020, and SEI reopened to international traffic on 1 June.

New restrictions were announced on 29 December 2020, including the closure of bars, casinos, spas, gyms and cinemas. The new restrictions were foreseen to remain in place for two weeks. and additional restrictive measures were announced on 3 January 2021. All existing restrictions were subsequently extended to the end of February 2021.

=== Museums ===
Following the lockdown on 9 April 2020, the National Museum in Seychelles is preparing to reopen to the public on 1 June 2020. In doing so, Seychelles will be the first country in the Eastern Africa Region to reopen its museum during the pandemic.

For business to resume to normalcy, certain guidelines have been put in place by the Seychelles Department of Health which will ultimately protect the Museum employees as well as visitors that visit Museums from contracting the coronavirus. Among the measures being instituted are tips for preparing for the arrival of the public, adapting the flow of visitors, strengthening health measures, restricting some access if necessary, as well as measures for reception and security staff, cleaning and conservation measures, and guidance for office staff.

=== Restrictions on international travel ===
On 9 May, the government extended the ban on cruise ships from entering Port Victoria until the end of 2021. People arriving by yacht must spend 14 days quarantined at sea, and people arriving by charter flight or private jet must demonstrate a negative COVID-19 test within 48 hours of departure. When scheduled air traffic resumed on 1 August, passengers arriving from low-risk or medium-risk needed to show a recent negative COVID-19 test and would not be allowed to stay at more than two approved locations the first seven days in Seychelles. Passengers arriving from countries categorized as high-risk would not be allowed to enter the country. On 5 August the Netherlands and Luxembourg were removed from the list of permitted countries, while Tunisia was added to it. On 17 August Belgium, Cuba, France and Malta were removed from the list of permitted countries while Portugal was added to it. On 24 August Tunisia was again removed from the list while Singapore was added to it. Effective 31 August, Qatar and Cambodia were added to the list of permitted countries, while South Korea was removed from it. Another update taking effect on 14 September removed Hungary from the list of permitted countries, while Vietnam, Pakistan, Egypt and Sweden were added to it. With effect from 1 October, Australia, Liechtenstein and South Korea were added to the permitted list, while Slovenia, Slovakia and United Arab Emirates were removed from it. For travellers from UAE, France, Germany, Switzerland, Austria, Italy or the UK, specific rules were introduced on 1 October, involving additional health checks in order to be permitted into Seychelles. From 19 October, travellers from Botswana, Burundi, Côte d'Ivoire, Ghana, Kenya, Malawi, Niger, Rwanda, South Africa and Zimbabwe were added to the list of permitted countries, while the specific rules previously in place for Germany, Switzerland, Austria and Italy were removed. From 16 November, travellers arriving from Cuba, Israel, Japan, Maldives, Malta, Saudi Arabia or Zambia are also permitted to enter Seychelles, whereas those from Canada, Denmark, Lithuania, Portugal or Sweden are no longer permitted. Additional entry requirements were reintroduced for travellers from Austria, Germany, Italy and Switzerland, as had previously been the case from 1 to 18 October. As of 7 December, travellers from Bahrein, Senegal and Togo are also allowed to enter. Travellers arriving from the UK were no longer permitted from 28 December, while those arriving from South Africa were no longer permitted from 31 December. As of the start of 2021, travellers from Cyprus, Latvia, Malaysia, Senegal or South Korea were no longer permitted to enter, while those from Gabon, Kuwait, Mongolia, Tajikistan and Uzbekistan were added to the list of permitted countries. From 21 February 2021, travellers from Bahrain, Cuba, Egypt and Zambia were no longer permitted, while Cyprus was added to the list of permitted countries.

From 12 November, all arriving passengers irrespective of origin need to present a recent negative PCR test, and test negative again on their sixth day in Seychelles.

== See also ==
- COVID-19 pandemic in Africa
- COVID-19 pandemic by country and territory
