= Patrick Herminie =

Seychellois politician (born 1963)

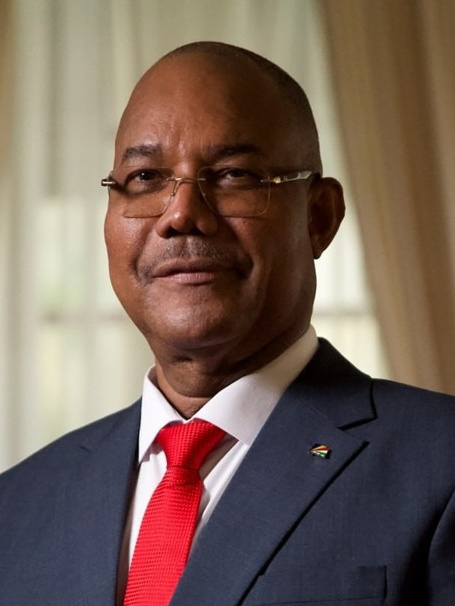
- Herminie in 2026

6th President of Seychelles
- Incumbent
- Assumed office 26 October 2025
- Vice President: Sebastien Pillay
- Preceded by: Wavel Ramkalawan

Speaker of the National Assembly of Seychelles
- In office 29 May 2007 – 27 September 2016
- Preceded by: Francis MacGregor
- Succeeded by: Patrick Pillay

Personal details
- Born: Mathew Antonio Patrick Herminie; 22 September 1963 (age 63) Baie St. Anne, Praslin, Colony of the Seychelles
- Party: US
- Spouse: Veronique Herminie
- Children: 2 - Venessa (born in 1991) and Martin (born in 1993)
- Education: University of Leeds; Charles University

Patrick Herminie (born 22 September 1963) is a Seychellois politician currently serving as the President of the Republic of Seychelles since October 2025.

He served as the Speaker of the National Assembly of Seychelles from 2007 to 2016. He was first elected to the Assembly in 1993 and served as the Leader of Government Business from 1998 to 2003. A former member of the People's Party, Herminie ran in the 2025 presidential election as the candidate for United Seychelles (US).

Following the opposition's victory in the September 2016 parliamentary election, Patrick Pillay was elected as Speaker of the National Assembly, succeeding Patrick Herminie on 27 September 2016.

== Early life, education and career ==
Patrick Herminie was born on 22 September 1963 at Baie St. Anne Praslin Hospital, on Seychelles' second-largest island. He was the fourth of five children in a family where his mother, Christa Herminie (née Jules), was a housewife, and his father, Louis Herminie, worked as a policeman.

A few years after Patrick was born, his parents, who had been living on Praslin due to his father's work posting, moved back to Mahé, the mainland of Seychelles. There, they settled and raised their five children. During this time, Patrick's father continued working as a policeman, while his mother, a former seamstress, stayed at home to care for the family.

As a young boy, Herminie attended Seychelles College, an all-boys' school established in 1947. At the time, Seychelles College, along with Regina Mundi Convent for girls, was regarded as a cornerstone of modern education in Seychelles. Both schools were closed in the early 1980s when the government introduced free and compulsory education, requiring children to attend schools within their respective districts.

While at Seychelles College, Herminie served as the captain of the Schalke 04 youth football team, leading them in various competitions.

After completing his O Levels and A Levels at Seychelles College, Herminie pursued a Doctorate in General Medicine at Charles University in Prague, Czechoslovakia, graduating in 1990.

Upon returning to Seychelles in 1991, he met Veronique Sinon, whom he later married. The couple has two children: Venessa Herminie, currently a medical doctor, and Martin Herminie, a civil engineer.

After earning his Doctorate in General Medicine, Herminie was appointed as a Medical Officer at Victoria Hospital in 1990. He was promoted to Senior Medical Officer in 1992 and became the Director of the Environmental Health Section at the Ministry of Health in 1995. That same year, he received the Chevening Award from the British government and completed a Master's degree in Public Health at the Nuffield Institute, University of Leeds, in England.

After returning to Seychelles, Herminie was appointed Director General of Disease Prevention and Control in the Ministry of Health in 1996. Committed to continually enhancing his knowledge and skill set, Herminie made it a priority to invest in further education. In 1997, he attended a Training of Trainers (Epidemic Control) course organized by the World Health Organization (WHO) in Addis Ababa, Ethiopia. The following year, in 1998, he was appointed Director General of the Division of Primary Health Care in the Ministry of Health.

From 2000 to 2003, Herminie served as the Director General of Primary Health Care at the Ministry of Health.

In 2004, Herminie decided to pursue a career as a full-time politician (see political career). However, he had to temporarily step back in 2016 when his party lost the legislative election. By that time, Herminie had served as the Speaker of the National Assembly.

From 2016 to 2020, Herminie served as Secretary of State for the Prevention of Drug Abuse and Rehabilitation. By then, Seychelles was facing an unprecedented epidemic of heroin addiction. In response, Herminie established an agency to tackle the issue directly.

In October 2023, Patrick Herminie was charged with witchcraft by the Seychellois public prosecutor. He denied the charges, describing them as politically motivated. In February 2024, the Victoria public prosecutor's office dropped all accusations against him.

== Political career ==
Herminie's political career began in 1992 when he was appointed as a member of the commission drafting the Constitution of the Third Republic. In 1993, he was elected as a Member of the National Assembly for the English River Constituency and was re-elected in 1998 and 2002.

=== Political offices ===
- 1998–2007: Leader of Government Business in the National Assembly (Majority Leader)
- 1998–2010: Member of the Central Committee of the Seychelles People's Progressive Front, the ruling party at the time
- 2003: Re-elected Member of the National Assembly for the English River Constituency
- 2007–2011 (October): Speaker of the 4th National Assembly of Seychelles
- 2011–2016 (September): Speaker of the 5th National Assembly of Seychelles
- 2015–2020: National Executive Committee Member for Parti Lepep / United Seychelles
- On 31 January 2021, Dr. Patrick Herminie was elected Leader of the United Seychelles Party, the main opposition political party.

=== Chairmanship ===
In 2012, Herminie was elected Chairperson of the Conference of Speakers and Presiding Officers of the Commonwealth (CSPOC) for the Africa Region, a position he held until 2013.

Between 2015 and 2016, Herminie was elected as a member of the Executive Committee of the SADC Parliamentary Forum and as Chairperson of the Conference of Speakers and Presiding Officers of the Commonwealth (CSPOC) at the international level.

During his time as Speaker of the National Assembly and a member of the Executive Committee of the SADC Parliamentary Forum, Herminie worked to raise the Assembly's standards to meet international norms. Additionally, he strengthened the competence of its secretariat to better support the needs of the new parliamentarians.

In 2017, President Danny Faure announced the composition of the Board of the new Agency for the Prevention of Drug Abuse and Rehabilitation (APDAR). The Board was headed by Herminie as chairperson, a position he held until 2020.

== 2025 presidential campaign ==
Herminie ran for president of Seychelles in the 2025 Seychellois general election, defeating incumbent president Wavel Ramkalawan following a run-off vote.

== Presidency (2025–present) ==
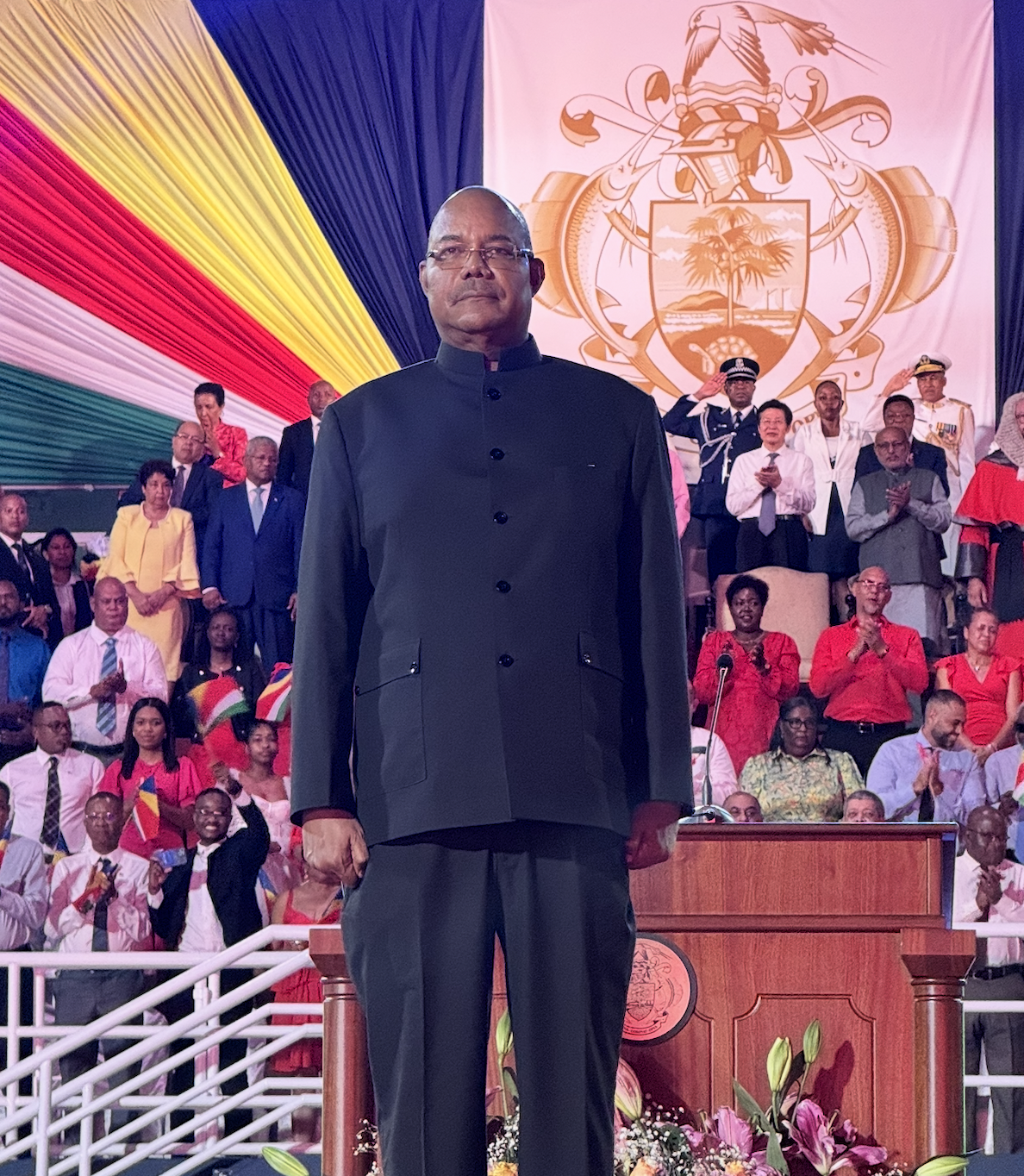
Patrick Herminie on inauguration day

On 26 October 2025, Dr. Patrick Herminie was sworn in as the 6th President of the Republic of Seychelles, replacing Wavel Ramkalawan.

The ceremony, held at Stade Linité in Victoria, was attended by senior government officials and foreign dignitaries, including the Vice President of the Republic of India, Chandrapuram Ponnusamy Radhakrishnan; the Prime Minister of Mauritius, Dr. Navinchandra Ramgoolam; the Vice Chairperson of the Chinese People’s Political Consultative Conference, Mr. Gao Yunlong; the Prime Minister of Tanzania, Hon. Kassim Majaliwa Majaliwa; and the President of the Council of Ministers of the Indian Ocean Commission and Minister for Foreign Affairs of the Comoros, Mr. Mohamed Mbae.

Also present were Herminie’s predecessor Wavel Ramkalawan, other former presidential candidates, and representatives of civil society.

During his inauguration speech, Herminie reiterated his campaign motto “for many, not the few” framing it as a guiding principle for his administration. He said his government would prioritize addressing inequality, strengthening public health and education systems, and ensuring that national development benefits all Seychellois, not just the privileged few.

“We may be a small nation, but we are a nation with a big heart. And in that heart, love for Seychelles unites us,” Herminie declared. “Just as Dr. Martin Luther King stood decades ago, tonight I too stand atop a mountain, and I have a dream, a Seychellois Creole dream, for a nation where unity is our strength, dignity our habit, and justice our daily existence. A nation united in our Creole culture.”

Herminie’s newly formed cabinet, which includes several first-time ministers and a record number of women, is expected to be the first gender-parity government in the country’s history.
