= Linyon Demokratik Seselwa =

Political party in Seychelles

Seychellois Democratic Alliance/Union Linyon Demokratik Seselwa
- Leader: Wavel Ramkalawan
- Founders: Roger Mancienne; Wavel Ramkalawan
- Founded: 8 April 2016
- Ideology: Liberalism; Economic liberalism
- Political position: Centre
- National Assembly: 15 / 34 (44%)

Website
- ldssesel.com

Linyon Demokratik Seselwa (lit. 'Seychellois Democratic Alliance/Union', LDS) is a liberal political coalition which has governed from 2020 to 2025 in the Seychelles. Their coalition was originally made up of the four main opposition parties: the Seychelles National Party (SNP) led by Wavel Ramkalawan, the Seychellois Alliance (LS) led by Patrick Pillay, the Seychelles Party for Social Justice and Democracy led by Alexia Amesbury and the Seychelles United Party led by Robert Ernesta. The Seychellois Alliance left the coalition in February 2018 after the resignation of their leader Patrick Pillay as speaker and member of the National Assembly in January 2018.

Seychelles opposition candidate Wavel Ramkalawan (LDS) won in the 2020 Seychellois general election with 54.9 percent of valid votes cast, upsetting incumbent President Danny Faure. The opposition won its first presidential poll in over 40 years since Seychelles gained independence from Britain. LDS received also a clear majority (25 out of 35 seats) in the National Assembly.

On 28 July 2024, Wavel Ramkalawan, President of Seychelles, became leader of the LDS, replacing Roger Mancienne.

In October 2025, Seychelles' main opposition leader Patrick Herminie won the presidential election, defeating incumbent Wavel Ramkalawan in a runoff with 52.7% of the vote, compared with Ramkalawan's 47.3%.

== Election results ==
=== Presidential elections ===
Election	Party candidate	Votes	%	Votes	%	Result
Election	Party candidate	First round		Second round		Result
2020	Wavel Ramkalawan	35,562	54.91%	–	–	Elected ✓
2025	Wavel Ramkalawan	29,230	46.44%	30,823	47.27	Lost ✗

=== National Assembly elections ===
Election	Party leader	Votes	%	Seats	+/–	Position	Result
2016	Roger Mancienne	30,444	49.59%	19 / 33	New	▲1st	Opposition
2020	Roger Mancienne	35,202	54.84%	25 / 35	▲6	1st	Government
2025	Wavel Ramkalawan	28,159	44.81%	15 / 34	▼10	▼2nd	Opposition

== See also ==
- Satya Naidu
