= Perennial candidate =

Political candidate who frequently runs for an elected office but seldom wins

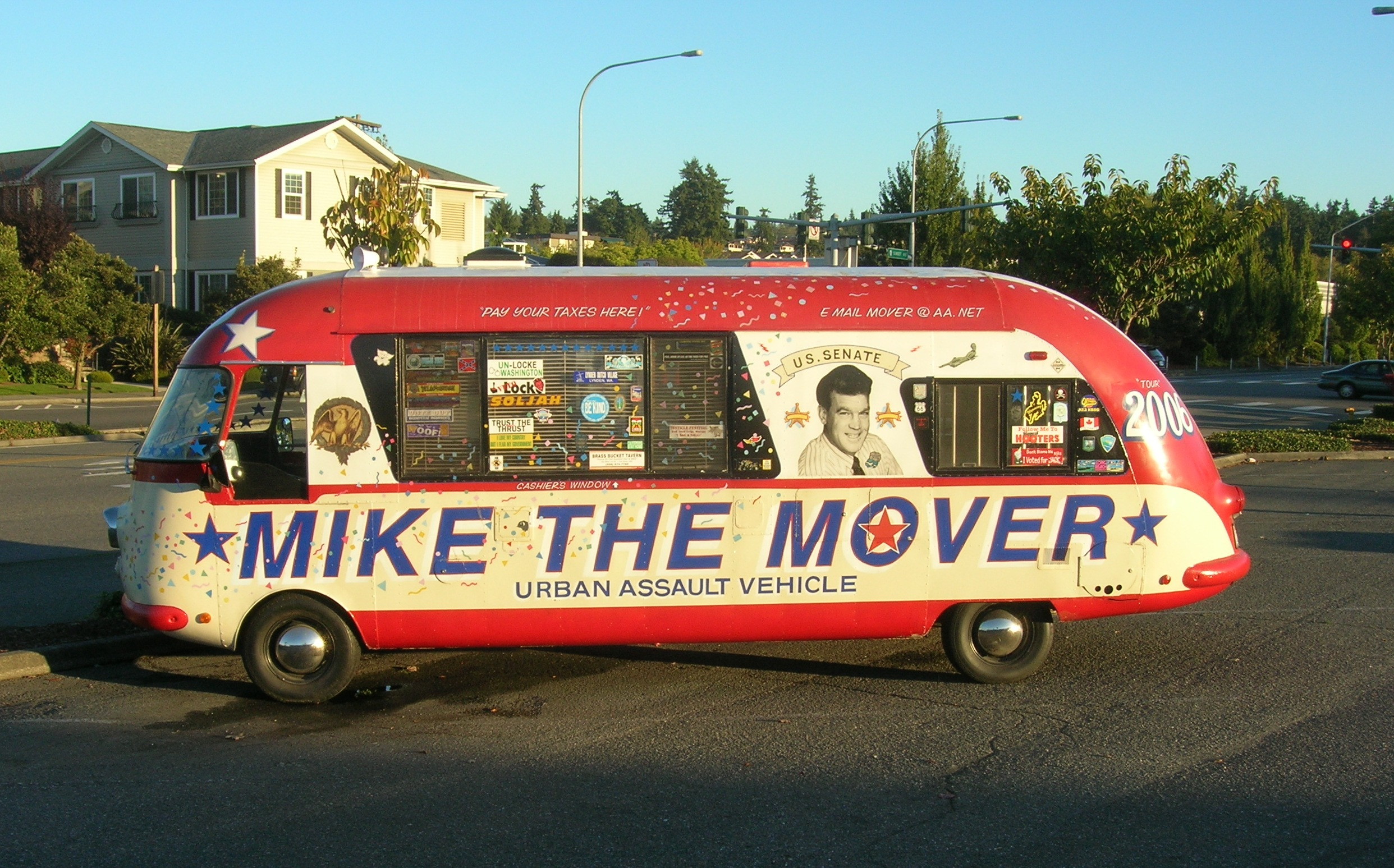
Mike The Mover has run for various offices under various political affiliations on 17 occasions to promote his furniture moving business.

A perennial candidate is a political candidate who frequently runs for elected office and rarely, if ever, wins. Perennial candidates are most common where there is no limit on the number of times that a person can run for office and little cost to register as a candidate.

== Definition ==
A number of modern articles related to electoral politics or elections have identified those who have run for elected office and lost two to three times, and then decide to mount a campaign again as perennial candidates. However, some articles have listed a number of notable exceptions.

Some who have had their campaign applications rejected by their country's electoral authority multiple times have also been labelled as perennial candidates.

== Reason for running ==
It has been noted that some perennial candidates take part in an election with the aim of winning, and some do have ideas to convey on the campaign trail, regardless of their chance for winning. Others have names similar to known candidates, and hope that the confusion will lead to success.

Some perennial candidates may mount a run as a way to help strengthen their party's standing in a parliamentary body, in an effort to become kingmaker in the event of a political stalemate.

Some perennial candidates have been accused of running for office continuously as a way to get public election funding. Some have also been accused of being backed by the government of their country, in an effort to make the government appear more rational in comparison.

Novelty candidates are those who run for office as a form of satire, parody or protest, without serious policies. Many novelty candidates are also perennial candidates, though the two concepts are distinct and perennial candidates are often serious politicians.

== Americas ==
=== Argentina ===
- Jorge Altamira, leader of the Trotskyist Workers' Party, has run for President five times (1989, 1995, 1999, 2003 and 2011). His best performance was in 2011, with 2.30% of the votes.
- Nicolás del Caño, leader of the Socialist Workers' Party has run for political positions five times (2013, 2015, 2017, 2019 and 2021). His best performance was in 2019, with 2.16% of the votes.

=== Bolivia ===
- Samuel Doria Medina, leader of National Unity Front, has run for President in 2005, 2009, 2014, and 2025 elections with best performance in 2014, with 25.1% of votes.

=== Brazil ===
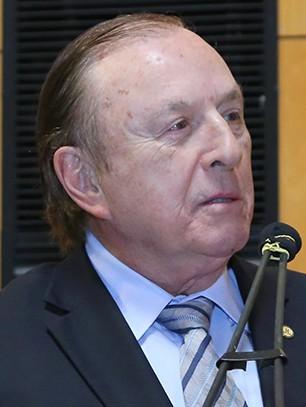
José Maria Eymael

- José Maria Eymael, a fringe political figure, ran for the presidency six times (1998, 2006, 2010, 2014, 2018 and 2022); he failed to reach 1% of the votes in any of those. He also unsuccessfully ran for mayor of São Paulo in 1985 and 1992, though he won two terms in the lower house of the National Congress of Brazil, from 1987 to 1995.
- Rui Costa Pimenta, leader and founder of the Trotskyist Workers' Cause Party (PCO), ran for the presidency in 2002, 2010, 2014 and is a declared candidate in 2026 (his candidacy in 2006 was blocked by the Superior Electoral Court). He was last in all his runs, with his best performance being 0.04% of the votes in 2002.
- Vera Guasso, labor union leader and member of the Unified Socialist Workers Party (PSTU), ran for the Porto Alegre city assembly, mayor of Porto Alegre, the Brazilian Senate and other positions in a non-stop serial candidacy (every two years, except for 2002) from the early 90s on. In her best results, she had numbers of votes in local Porto Alegre elections similar to those of lesser-voted elected candidates but did not get a seat due to her party's overall voting being small. PSTU traditionally enters elections with no visible chance in order to, allegedly, "put a leftist set of points in discussion" and "build the party" but has lately achieved some expressive numbers.
- Ciro Gomes has run for president four times, losing on every occasion. He ran for the Popular Socialist Party in 1998 and 2002, and for the Democratic Labour Party in 2018 and 2022. He has been successful in elections for mayor, governor and deputy.
- Enéas Carneiro, a cardiologist and founder of the far-right Party of the Reconstruction of the National Order (PRONA), ran for president three times, in 1989, 1994 and 1998. He was mostly known for his comical style of speech on political broadcasts (due in part to the reduced TV time his party had) and his distinct beard. He also ran for mayor in São Paulo at the 2000 elections, before finally being elected federal deputy in 2002 with record voting. He was re-elected in 2006 but died in 2007 from myeloid leukemia.
- José Maria de Almeida, leader of the Trotskyist United Socialist Workers' Party (PSTU), ran for the presidency on four occasions: 1998, 2002, 2010 and 2014. His best performance was in 2002 when he got 0.47% of the votes.
- Levy Fidelix, leader and founder of the conservative Brazilian Labour Renewal Party (PRTB), ran for all municipal and general elections held in Brazil from 1996 to 2020. He was twice candidate for the presidency (in 2010 and 2014), twice candidate for the Governor of São Paulo (in 1998 and 2002) and five times candidate for the Mayor of São Paulo (in 1996, 2008, 2012, 2016 and 2020), never being elected for any position in his political career. He succumbed to COVID-19 on April 23, 2021.

=== Canada ===
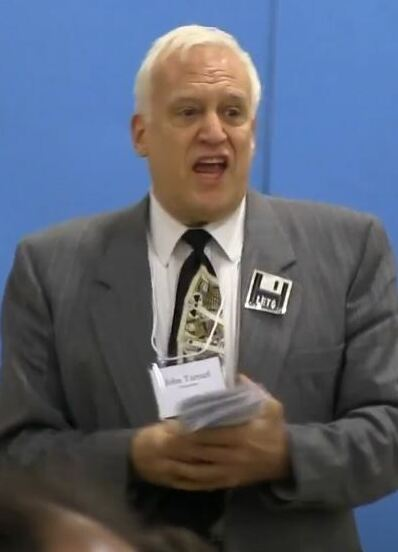
John Turmel according to the Guinness World Records holds the records for the most elections contested and for the most elections lost, having contested 112 elections and lost 111.

- Don Andrews, leader of the unregistered Nationalist Party of Canada has run for Mayor of Toronto several times, 1972, 1974, 1976, 1988, 1991, 1994, 1997, 2003, 2010 and most recently in 2014, when he came in seventh place with 0.10% of the vote.
- Michael Baldasaro (1949–2016), a leader of the pro-marijuana Church of the Universe, ran for Mayor of Hamilton, Ontario in 1988, 1991, 1994, 2000, 2003, 2006, 2010, and 2014 and, among other federal and provincial campaigns, attempted to seek the leadership of the Progressive Conservative Party of Canada in 1988.
- Douglas Campbell has run as a fringe candidate for the House of Commons in the 1960s, the leadership of both the Ontario and federal New Democratic Party in the 1970s and 1980s, and Mayor of North York, Ontario. He ran for Mayor of Toronto in 2000, 2003 and 2006.
- Ross Dowson, leader of the Canadian Trotskyist group the Revolutionary Workers Party (later the League for Socialist Action) ran for Mayor of Toronto nine times in the 1940s, 1950s, and 1960s. His best result was in 1949, when he won 20% of the vote in a two-man race. He also ran twice for the House of Commons of Canada.
- Terry Duguid is a Manitoba politician who has run multiple times for city council, mayor and MP in Winnipeg. He lost the 1995 Winnipeg Civic election and lost the 2004 and 2006 federal elections in Kildonan—St. Paul, then ran and lost in Winnipeg South in 2011. He ran in Winnipeg South again in 2015, this time winning the seat with 58% of the vote. He was re-elected for Winnipeg South in 2019 with 42% of the vote.
- Jim Enos, a Hamilton, Ontario-based social conservative and Christian activist, has sought elected office nine times over three decades. Enos ran provincially in 1999, 2007, 2011, and 2018, federally in the riding of Hamilton Mountain in 2011, 2015, 2019, and 2021, and for the public school board in the 2003 Hamilton Municipal Election. Enos has run with the Family Coalition Party of Ontario, Christian Heritage Party of Canada, and as an independent.
- Henri-Georges Grenier ran 13 times for the House of Commons of Canada between 1945 and 1980 on the tickets of a variety of political parties, for each of which he was the sole candidate.
- Ben Kerr, a street musician, ran for Mayor of Toronto seven times between 1985 and his death in 2005. He was best known for his country music performances and for advocating the medicinal benefits of drinking a concoction that has cayenne pepper as its main ingredient.
- Patricia Métivier contested 24 Canadian federal, provincial or municipal elections from 1972 to 2001.
- David Popescu has run for federal, provincial, and municipal office multiple times since 1998 on an extreme anti-abortion and anti-gay platform. While campaigning in the 2008 election, he advocated the execution of homosexual people, which precipitated charges under Canada's hate crime laws.
- Naomi Rankin ran for the Communist Party of Canada in 2008, her eighth attempt at becoming an MP. She has also run six times for the Communist Party of Alberta, all of which were also unsuccessful.
- Gilbert Thibodeau has run four times for municipal office in Montreal between 2013 in 2025, most notably when he came in third place with 10% of the vote as a mayoral candidate in 2025.
- Alex Tyrrell, leader of the Green Party of Quebec, has run 11 times between 2012 and 2022 for provincial general elections and by-elections.
- John Turmel is in the Guinness Book of World Records for being the candidate who has the "most elections contested" and lost 103 as of October 2022 (he also ran in a by-election canceled due to a general election).
- Harry Bradley ran for the Toronto Board of Control 24 times between 1930 and 1964. He also ran for mayor in 1960 and 1962, and for city council in 1969.
- Kevin Clarke is a homeless person who has unsuccessfully contested municipal, provincial and federal offices in Toronto numerous times from the 1990s to the present, often as leader of The People's Political Party.
- Régent Millette is a teacher in Quebec who has run for public office at the municipal, provincial, and federal levels over 25 times since 2000.
- Don Woodstock of Winnipeg has contested several positions at all three levels of government. He unsuccessfully ran for provincial seats in 2007 and 2011 as a Liberal, and in 2016 as an independent. He ran federally in 2015 as a Green candidate, and received national attention after being called a "son of a bitch" by NDP incumbent Pat Martin during a televised debate. Woodstock ran for city council in 2014 and ran as a mayoral candidate in the 2018 election.
- Paul Fromm is an anti-immigration activist who has run in many municipal, provincial and federal office elections. He ran in Mississauga East in the 1988 federal election, for mayor of Mississauga in the 2010 and 2014 municipal elections across Peel Region, Ontario, in Calgary Southeast in the 2011 federal election, for mayor of Hamilton in the 2018 municipal election for the single-tier city, and for Etobicoke Centre in the 2018 Ontario general election.
- Larry Heather is an anti-abortion activist who has run for office 29 times between 1984 and 2025 at the municipal, provincial, and federal levels of government in Calgary. He has run in multiple elections per year in 8 years, including 2017 when he ran for office in all three levels of government.

=== Chile ===
- Marco Enríquez-Ominami has run as the Progressive Party's presidential candidate in every election since the 2009–10 Chilean presidential election.
- Franco Parisi has run as the Party of the People's presidential candidate in 2013, 2021, and 2025.
- Eduardo Artés, has run as the Patriotic Union's presidential candidate in 2017, 2021, and 2025.

=== Colombia ===
- Horacio Serpa Uribe, three-times Liberal Party's presidential candidate (1998, 2002, 2006).
- Antanas Mockus, two-times presidential candidate (2006, 2010), one-time vicepresidential candidate (1998).
- Noemí Sanín, three-times Conservative Party's presidential candidate (1998, 2002, 2010).
- Álvaro Gómez Hurtado, three times Conservative Party's presidential candidate (1974, 1986, 1990).
- Enrique Peñalosa, five-times Bogotá's mayor candidate (1994, 1997, 2007, 2011, 2015), one-time senatorial candidate (2006), one-time presidential candidate (2014).
- Sergio Fajardo, three-times presidential candidate (2018, 2022, 2026), one-time vice presidential candidate (2010).
- Regina 11, three-times presidential candidate (1986, 1990, 1994).

=== Costa Rica ===
- Otto Guevara, a five-time presidential candidate.
- Walter Muñoz Céspedes, a five-time presidential candidate.
- Máximo Fernández Alvarado, a three-time presidential candidate.

=== Ecuador ===
- Álvaro Noboa ran unsuccessfully for president in 1998, 2002, 2006, 2009 and 2013; he attempted to run for president in 2021 but his candidacy was suspended by the electoral authorities due to an alleged violation of registration requirements. His son, Daniel, was successfully elected as president in the 2023 election and reelected in 2025.

=== Guatemala ===
- Alejandro Giammattei, a three-time presidential candidate (2007, 2011 and 2015), he won during his fourth election campaign in 2019. He previously ran unsuccessfully twice for mayor of Guatemala City (1999 and 2003).
- Sandra Torres, a three-time presidential candidate, each time losing in the run-off.
- Mario Estrada, a three-time presidential candidate (2007, 2011 and 2015).
- Eduardo Suger, a three-time presidential candidate (2003, 2007 and 2011).
- Roberto González Díaz-Durán, a four-time mayoral candidate in Guatemala City (2007, 2011, 2019 and 2023), he came in second place in all elections.

=== Mexico ===
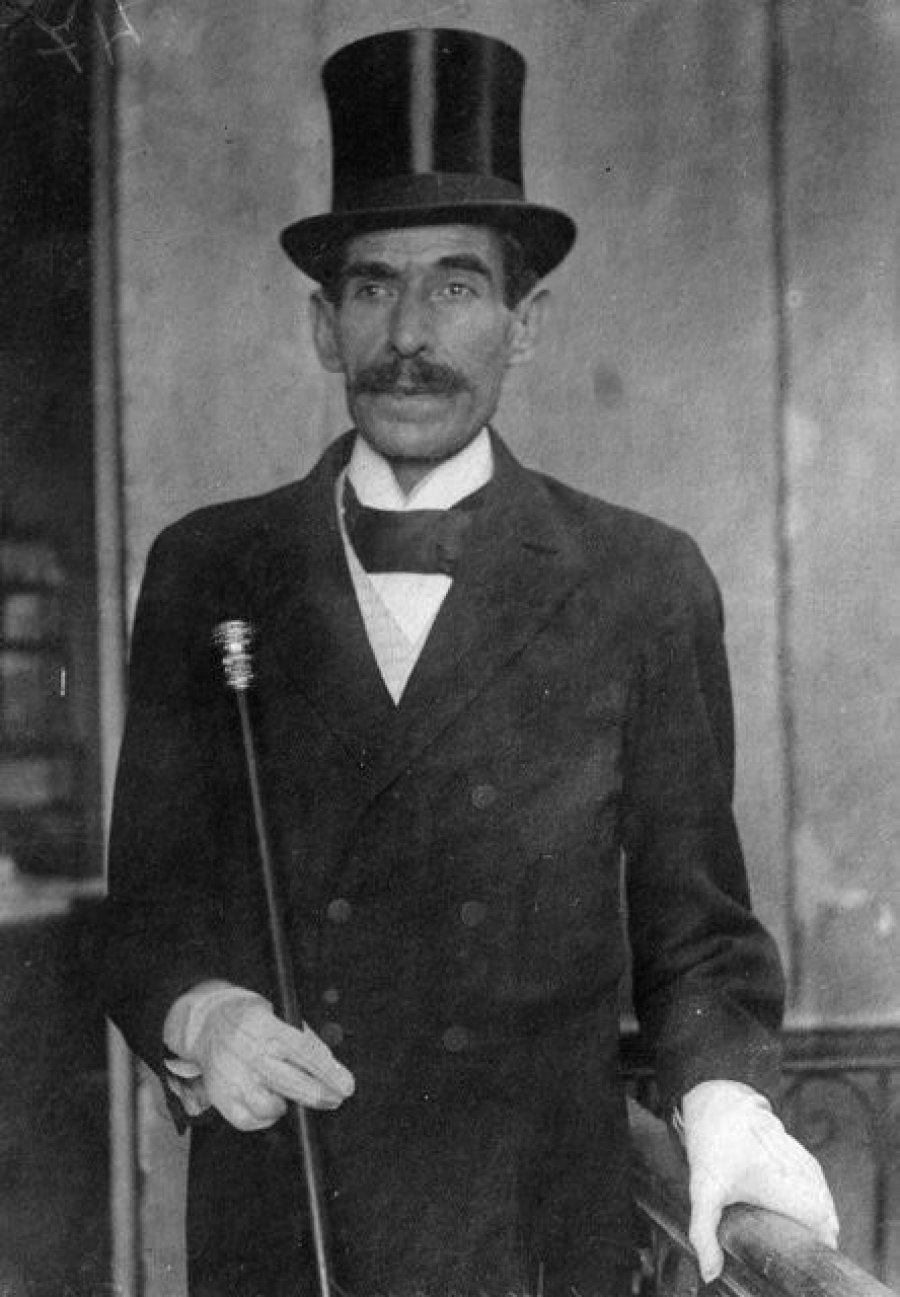
Nicolás Zúñiga y Miranda

- Nicolás Zúñiga y Miranda was a presidential candidate 10 times: 1892, 1896, 1900, 1904, 1910, 1911, 1913, 1917, 1920 and 1924 and also tried to run for a seat in the Congress of Mexico at least twice. The eccentric Zúñiga never got more than a few votes, but always claimed to have been the victim of fraud and considered himself to be the legitimate President.
- Cuauhtémoc Cárdenas was a presidential candidate three times: 1988, 1994 and 2000. He was also was elected the first Head of Government of Mexico City after the abolition of the city's federal immediacy in 1997, was the leader of the left-wing Party of the Democratic Revolution (PRD), and was Governor of the state of Michoacan. He was projected to win the 1988 election, which was admittedly rigged against him, according to the president at the time, Miguel de la Madrid.

=== Nicaragua ===
- Daniel Ortega ran unsuccessfully for president in 1990, 1996 and 2001, before being elected president in 2006.

=== Paraguay ===
- Domingo Laíno ran unsuccessfully for president three times: 1989, 1993, and 1998. His best performance was in 1998, with 43.88% of the votes.
- Efraín Alegre was a presidential candidate three times: 2013, 2018, and 2023. His best performance was in 2018, with 45.08% of the votes.

=== Peru ===
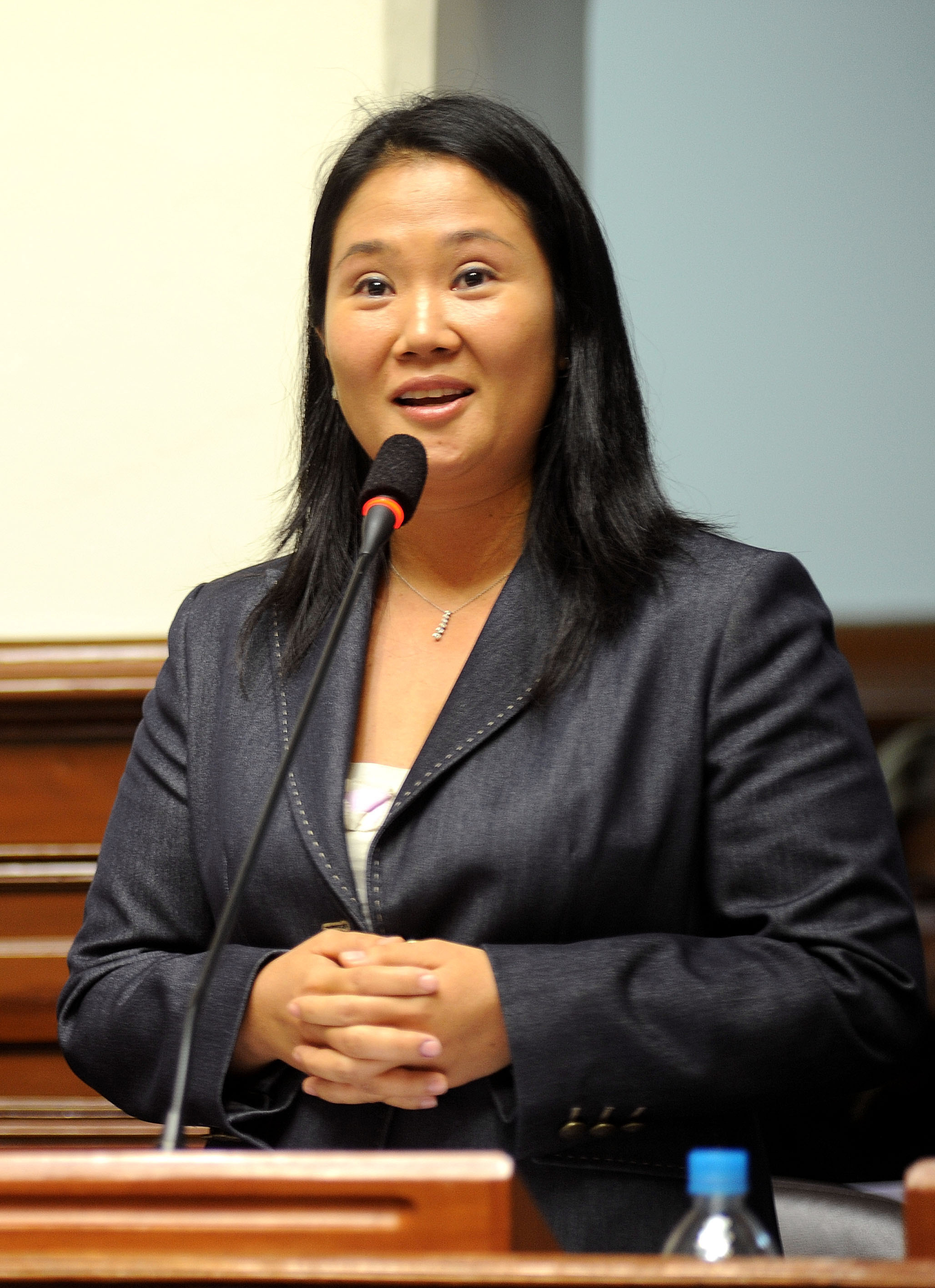
Keiko Fujimori

- Roger Cáceres Velásquez, FRENATRACA presidential candidate in 1980 with 2% of the vote, 1985 with 2% of the vote and 1990 with 1.3% of the vote.
- Ezequiel Ataucusi, FREPAP presidential candidate in 1990 with 1.1% of the vote, in 1995 with 0.8% of votes and in 2000 with 0.75% of votes.
- Ricardo Noriega Salaverry, presidential candidate for All for Victory in 2001 with 0.31% of the vote and for Desperate National in 2011 with 0.15% of the vote. He was also a candidate from Independent Civic Union for senator in 1990.
- Andrés Alcántara Paredes, presidential candidate of Direct Democracy in 2021 with 0.29% of the vote. He also was not elected as a congressman in the 2000 elections, 2016 and 2020, and as Mayor of Santiago de Chuco.
- Ciro Gálvez ran unsuccessfully for president three times in 2001, 2006 and the most recent in 2021 and ran unsuccessfully for Governor twice in 2002 and 2006.
- Keiko Fujimori, the daughter of former president Alberto Fujimori ran unsuccessfully for president three times in 2011, 2016 and 2021, each time losing in the run-off. She ran again for the fourth time in 2026, in which she won.
- Jaime Salinas, candidate for mayor of Lima in 2002 and 2018 and presidential in 2006, without being elected and with low percentages such as 0.53% in the 2006 presidential elections and 3.5% in the 2018 municipal elections.
- Francisco Diez-Canseco Távara ran unsuccessfully for president three times in 2016, 2021 and 2026 in which, in 2016, he withdrew from the race and in 2021, his candidacy was rejected.
- Fernando Olivera ran unsuccessfully for president five times in 2001, 2006, 2016, 2021 and 2026 in which, in 2006, he withdrew from the race and in 2021, his candidacy was rejected.
- Máximo San Román ran for the vice presidency four times between 1990, 1995, 2006 and 2011 in which, in 1990, he was successful and ran for the presidency on in 2000.

=== Uruguay ===
- Luis Alberto de Herrera ran for President as the National Party candidate six times (1922, 1926, 1930, 1942, 1946 and 1950)
- Pablo Mieres ran for President as the Independent Party candidate five times (2004, 2009, 2014, 2019 and 2024), and previously he ran for Vice President in 1999.
- Minor politician Carlos Iafigliola has been running for president in the National Party presidential primaries of the last years.

== Africa ==
=== Benin ===
- Bruno Amoussou, leader of the Social Democratic Party, ran for President four times (1991, 1996, 2001 and 2006) before reaching the presidential age limit.
- Adrien Houngbédji, leader of the Democratic Renewal Party, ran for President five times (1991, 1996, 2001, 2006 and 2011) before reaching the presidential age limit.

=== Central African Republic ===
- Martin Ziguélé has run for President as the MLPC candidate four times (2005, 2011, 2015 and 2020).

=== Gambia ===
- Ousainou Darboe, leader of the United Democratic Party, has run for President five times (1996, 2001, 2006, 2011 and 2021).
- Sheriff Mustapha Dibba, leader of the National Convention Party, ran for President four times (1982, 1987, 1992 and 2001).

=== Ghana ===
- Edward Mahama, leader of the People's National Convention, has run for President five times (1996, 2000, 2004, 2008 and 2016).

=== Kenya ===
- Raila Odinga, leader of the Orange Democratic Movement, has run for President five times (1997, 2007, 2013, 2017 and 2022), losing every single time. Prior to that and under the old Kenyan Constitution, Raila was a member of parliament for the Lang'ata Constituency.

=== Mauritania ===
- Ahmed Ould Daddah has run for President four times (1992, 2003, 2007 and 2009).

=== Mozambique ===
- Afonso Dhlakama, leader of RENAMO, contested the presidency five times (1994, 1999, 2004, 2009 and 2014).

=== Namibia ===
- McHenry Venaani, leader of Popular Democratic Movement (formerly Democratic Turnhalle Alliance), previously ran for presidency on 2014, 2019, and 2024 elections.

=== Nigeria ===
- Atiku Abubakar ran for president in 2007, 2019 and 2023. He was also a presidential primary candidate in 1993, 2011 and 2015.

=== Senegal ===
- Abdoulaye Wade ran for presidency seven times, and lost to incumbent president in 1978, 1983, 1988, 1993. He won in 2000 and 2007, and lost again most recently in 2012.

=== Seychelles ===
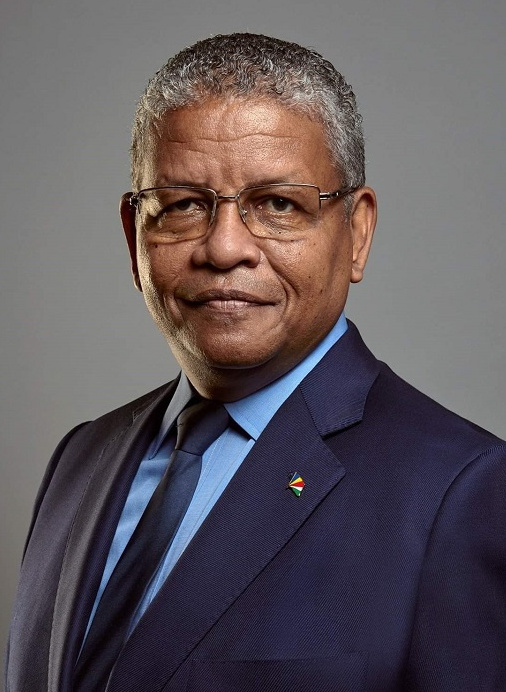
Wavel Ramkalawan

- Philippe Boullé has unsuccessfully run for President five times (1993, 2001, 2006, 2011 and 2015).
- Wavel Ramkalawan, leader of the Seychelles National Party, has run for President six times. He lost in 1998, 2001, 2006, 2011 and 2015, ranking second place every election with huge minority, and won in 2020.

=== Tanzania ===
- Ibrahim Lipumba, leader of the Civic United Front, has run for President five times (1995, 2000, 2005, 2010 and 2020).

=== Zambia ===
- Hakainde Hichilema, leader of UPND contested in the 2006, 2008, 2011, 2015, 2016 and 2021 elections, the last of which he won.
- Godfrey Miyanda, leader of the Heritage Party, has run for President four times (2001, 2006, 2008 and 2011).

=== Zimbabwe ===
- Morgan Tsvangirai, leader of Movement for Democratic Change – Tsvangirai, ran for President in the 2002, 2008, and 2013 elections.

== Asia ==
=== Hong Kong ===
- Avery Ng
- Bull Tsang
- Frederick Fung, initially gained success in almost every election, including District Council, Urban Council and Legislative Council election since 1983. However, since 2015, Fung faced consecutive failures in every election he participated, including 2015 (District Council), 2016 (Legislative Council), March 2018 (Democratic Primary), November 2018 (Legislative Council By-election) and 2019 (District Council). He lost popularity because of his unwillingness to retire, as the Pro-democracy supporters having negative feelings on gerontocracy.
- Christine Fong, has run for Legislative elections five times since 2008, but failed every time.

=== India ===
- Hotte Paksha Rangaswamy was a political leader from the Indian state of Karnataka, who had a penchant for contesting elections. He is a Guinness World Record holder for having contested the highest number of elections—he unsuccessfully did so 86 times.
- Joginder Singh (alias Dharti Pakar meaning "one who clings to the ground", earned after several unsuccessful runs for President of India) was a textile owner who contested and lost over 300 elections in India. Although his nomination papers were usually disregarded by the election commission, he reached his high-water mark during the 1992 presidential election, in which he earned fourth place in the polling with 1,135 votes, eventually losing to Shankar Dayal Sharma.
- K. Padmarajan, a doctor turned politician from the state of Tamil Nadu, had contested 199 elections, and lost all of them. Limca Book of Records named him as "India's most unsuccessful candidate".

=== Indonesia ===
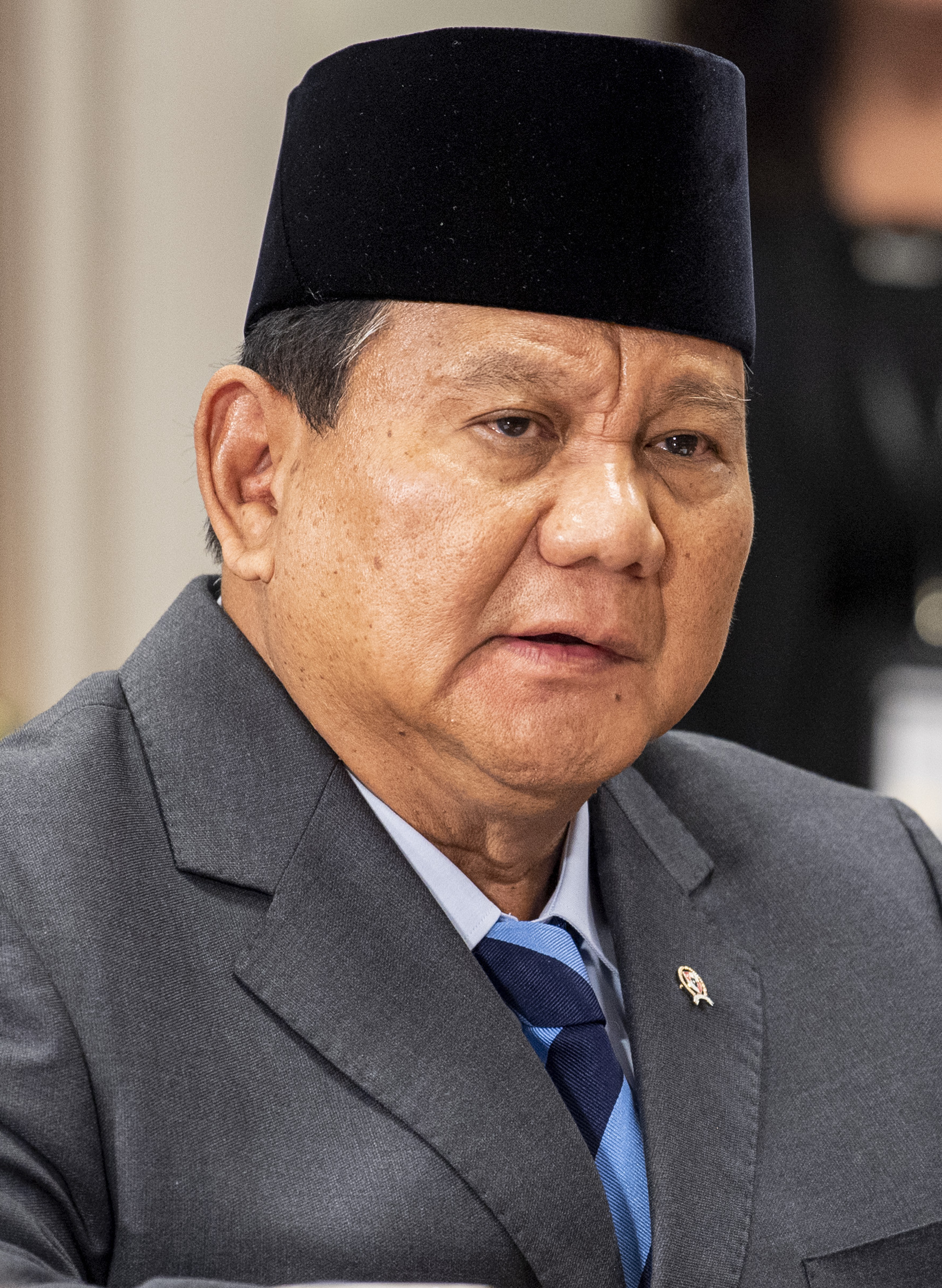
Prabowo Subianto

- Alzier Dianis Thabranie, politician and businessman previously ran for governor of Lampung in 2003, 2008, and 2014 where 2 of his early victories were annulled
- Prabowo Subianto, former Army lieutenant general, ran unsuccessfully as president and vice president three times: in 2009, as the running mate for Megawati Sukarnoputri, and in 2014 and 2019 as a presidential candidate. In August 2022, Prabowo announced that he accepted Gerindra Party's nomination to contest the 2024 presidential election, marking his fourth consecutive bid for national leadership and the third for the presidency in which he won.

=== Iran ===
- Mohsen Rezaee ran for president four times, in 2005, 2009, 2013 and 2021. He was defeated thrice and withdrew once (in 2005). Rezaee had previously ran for an Iranian Parliament seat in 2000, but had not succeeded.
- Mohammad Bagher Ghalibaf (see Electoral history of Mohammad Bagher Ghalibaf) has run for president four times, in 2005, 2013, 2017 and 2024. He was defeated thrice and withdrew once.

=== Israel ===
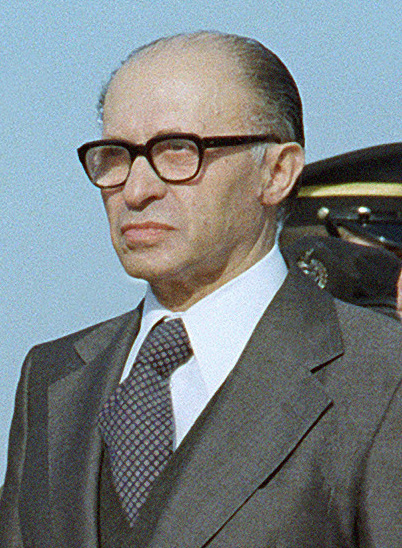
Menachem Begin

- Menachem Begin ran as head of the Revisionist Herut, Gahal, and Likud parties eight times from 1949 to 1977 before finally winning the 1977 Israeli legislative election and becoming Prime Minister.
- Vladimir Herczberg, a nuclear physicist. Ran for Mayor of Beersheba and for a Knesset seat twice, and ran for the leadership of the Likud party in its 2012 leadership election. Also ran for the leadership of the Jewish Agency, World Jewish Congress, and the Euro-Asian Jewish Congress.

=== Japan ===
- Bin Akao ran in numerous elections for his Greater Japan Patriotic Party until 1989, one year prior to his death.
- Mac Akasaka, real name Makoto Tonami, was a candidate for many political offices, especially the governor of Tokyo 2012, 2016 and mayor of Osaka in 2014. Won a seat as a Minato Assembly Member in 2019; retired from politics in 2023.
- Yūtokutaishi Akiyama, an engraver artist, photographer, was a candidate for Governor of Tokyo 1975 and 1979, bringing pop art into the process. Died in 2020.
- Teruki Gotō was a candidate for Mayor of Chiyoda Ward, Tokyo (2013), City Assembly of Chiyoda (2015), and the Governor of Tokyo (2016, 2020, 2024). Notorious for his far-right political views, eccentric personality and naked election posters. Died in 2026.
- Hideyoshi Hashiba, real name Seizō Mikami, ran in numerous elections from 1976 to 2011 and was notably a common face in the Tokyo gubernatorial elections. Died in 2015.
- Mitsuo Matayoshi (alias Jesus Matayoshi), leader of the World Economic Community Party and self-proclaimed Messiah, ran in at least nine local and national elections from 1997 to 2017. Died in 2018.
- Yoshiro Nakamatsu (alias Dr. NakaMats), inventor and perennial candidate in Tokyo, has unsuccessfully campaigned to be elected Governor of Tokyo numerous times since 1995, most recently in 2024.

=== Philippines ===
- Pascual Racuyal unsuccessfully ran for President 11 times (1935, 1941, 1946, 1949, 1953, 1957, 1961, 1965, 1969, 1981 and 1986), although he was disqualified on all but two (1935 and 1969).
- Elly Pamatong was disqualified in running for president at least twice (2004 and 2010). After his death in 2021, people asked if he will run in the 2022 presidential election, as his death was not announced to the public.

=== Singapore ===
Many perennial candidates in Singapore are from opposition political parties who do not have as significant an influence as the ruling People's Action Party in parliament or are extraparliamentary parties who have never been represented in parliament or have been unrepresented for some time. Some noted perennial candidates stand as independents but this is relatively rare.

- Ooi Boon Ewe, tuition teacher and executive. Contested once in the 2001 election as an independent, but failed to receive nominations in subsequent elections, most recently in 2025. Also made unsuccessful bids for the candidacy in four presidential elections (1999, 2005, 2011 and 2017).
- Zeng Guo Yuan, former Workers' Party candidate. In later years noted for his eccentric personality where he would state he would contest in an election but would withdraw his nomination at the last minute; his last foray into politics was in 2015 in which he decided to withdraw. Later abandoned politics due to his cancer diagnosis and became a panhandler. Died in 2019.
- Chee Soon Juan, longstanding secretary-general of the Singapore Democratic Party. Notable as having been arrested by the police multiple times for defamation and protesting without a public permit and has been declared bankrupt in the past, disallowing him to stand for election in 2006 and 2011. Nearly won a seat as a Non-constituency Member of Parliament (NCMP) in 2025 but was outperformed by a number of Workers' Party candidates.
- Paul Tambyah, doctor and chairman of the Singapore Democratic Party.
- Goh Meng Seng, founder and former secretary-general of the People's Power Party; contested every general election from 2006 to 2025. Party suffered significant losses during the 2025 general election.
- Desmond Lim, secretary-general of the Singapore Democratic Alliance. Has contested every general election since 2001, typically losing his election deposit. Gained notoriety in 2013 for a speech he gave showcasing his poor command of the English language.
- Lim Tean, lawyer and secretary-general of Peoples Voice and founder of the People's Alliance for Reform; contested every general election since 2015.
- Kenneth Jeyaretnam, former secretary-general of the Reform Party and son of noted opposition politician J. B. Jeyaretnam; contested every general election from 2011 to 2020. Died in 2026.
- Tan Jee Say, co-founder of the now-defunct Singaporeans First and current member of the Singapore Democratic Party.
- Ang Yong Guan, co-founder of the now-defunct Singaporeans First and current member of the Progress Singapore Party.
- James Gomez, professor and member of the Singapore Democratic Party.
- Mohamad Hamim Aliyas, secretary-general of the Democratic Progressive Party.
- Han Hui Hui, activist; contested in the 2015 general election as an independent and the 2025 general election as a member of the People's Alliance for Reform.
- Spencer Ng, secretary-general of the National Solidarity Party.
- Sebastian Teo, former president of the National Solidarity Party. Last contested the 2020 election.

=== South Korea ===
- Huh Kyung-young has run for the President of South Korea five times (1987, 1992, 1997, 2007 and 2022.)

=== Taiwan ===
- Soong Chu-yu, Chairman of People First Party, Governor of Taiwan Province (1993–1998), ran for president four times (2000, 2012, 2016, and 2020) and for vice president once (2004).
- Pan Han-shen, leader of Trees Party and former leader of Green Party Taiwan, a five-time candidate of the member of the Legislative Yuan.

=== Turkey ===
- Doğu Perinçek, chairman of the Patriotic Party, unsuccessfully ran for parliament nine times (1991, 1995, 1999, 2002, 2007, 2011, June 2015, November 2015 and 2023). He also unsuccessfully ran for presidency in 2018 and failed to be nominated in 2023.
- Fatma Ragibe Kanıkuru Loğoğlu, unsuccessfully ran for every election in Istanbul since 1984.

== Europe ==
=== Cyprus ===
- Kostas Kyriacou, otherwise known as "Outopos", has been a candidate for every presidential and parliamentary election since 1998 but has never gained more than 1% of the vote.

=== Czech Republic ===
- Jana Bobošíková is known for a series of unsuccessful candidatures in various elections. She unsuccessfully ran two times for presidency of the Czech Republic (2008 and 2013), the Chamber of Deputies (2010, 2013, 2021 and 2025), the Senate (2010 and 2011 by-election), Mayor of Prague (2010) and general manager of Czech Television (2009).
- Petr Hannig was the leader of the Party of Common Sense. Since 2002, he has repeatedly run for the Chamber of Deputies and Senate. He also ran for the Czech presidency in 2018 election, but failed as well, ending last but one with 0.57% of votes. He also wanted to run in 2023 presidential election but failed to get nomination.
- Miroslav Sládek ran for the Czechoslovak presidency in 1992. After the dissolution of Czechoslovakia he sought the Czech presidency in 1993, 1998 and 2018. He withdrew from the 2018 election due to the failure of his party in the 2017 legislative election.
- Jan Švejnar unsuccessfully ran for the Czech presidency in 2008. He also ran for the position in 2013 but withdrew. He planned to run for the office in 2018 but he did not receive political support. Some politicians noted that Švejnar lives in the United States and "shows up in the Czech Republic only when there is a presidential election."
- Jiří Paroubek, a former Prime Minister of the Czech Republic, has repeatedly tried to restart his political career under various political parties since 2010. He ran for the Chamber of Deputies in 2013, Senate in 2018 and European Parliament in 2014 and 2024 but was never elected.

=== Denmark ===
- Tom Gillesberg ran in general and municipal elections in Copenhagen in the years between 2005 and 2022. Gillesberg ran on a platform of building a maglev train over Kattegat and banking reform in the style of Glass–Steagall.

=== Finland ===
- Paavo Väyrynen ran for President four times (1988, 1994, 2012 and 2018), the first three times as the candidate for the Centre Party and then the fourth time as an independent candidate. He also intended to run as an independent in the 2024 election, but did not get enough signatures to be put on the ballot.

=== France ===
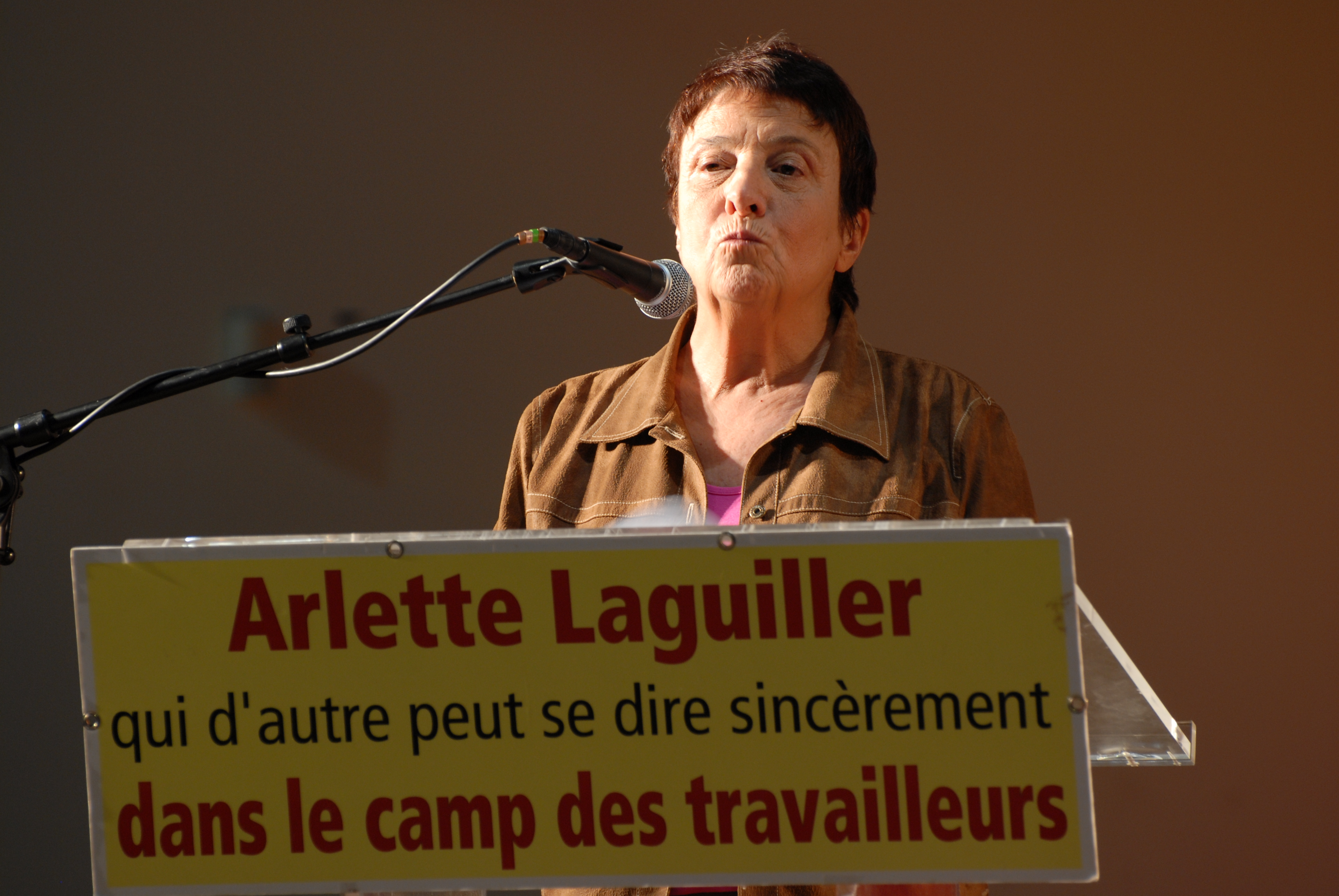
Trotskyist activist Arlette Laguiller - pictured here during her last campaign in 2007 - holds the record for the number of candidacies in a French presidential election.

- Arlette Laguiller, spokesperson of Workers' Struggle, ran for President six times (1974, 1981, 1988, 1995, 2002 and 2007). Her successor as spokesperson, Nathalie Arthaud, ran for president in 2012, 2017 and 2022, and plans to run in 2027.
- Jean-Marie Le Pen, leader of the National Front, ran for President five times (1974, 1988, 1995, 2002 - reaching the runoff that year in a major upset - and 2007). He had also tried to run in 1981, but failed to secure the mandatory 500 endorsements of elected officials. His daughter and successor as party leader, Marine Le Pen, ran for president in 2012, 2017 and 2022 (reaching the runoff in the latter two) and plans to run again in 2027.
- Jacques Cheminade, French representative of the LaRouche movement, ran for President three times (1995, 2012 and 2017) and finished last each time, securing 0.28, 0.25 and 0.18% of the vote respectively. He also attempted to run in 2002 and 2007, failing to secure enough endorsements, and contested multiple legislative elections.
- Nicolas Dupont-Aignan, leader of Debout la France, ran for President three times (2012, 2017 and 2022), securing 1.79, 4.70 and 2.06 % of the vote. He also plans to run again in 2027.
- Nicolas Miguet, a controversial journalist, businessman and taxpayers' advocate, led lists to the 1999 and 2004 European Parliament elections, securing 1,77% and 0,62% of the vote. He tried to run for President in 2002, 2007, 2012, 2017 and 2022, failing each time to secure enough endorsements. He ran multiple times at the legislative and departmental elections and, in 2020, ran for mayor of the 14th arrondissement of Paris, receiving 0,56% of the votes.
- François Asselineau contested multiple elections as leader of the Popular Republican Union: legislative (2017, 2022, 2024, plus several local snap elections), European (2014, 2019, 2024), departmental (2015) and regional (2015, 2021). He ran for president in 2017, securing 0,92% of the vote; in 2012 and 2022, he failed to get enough endorsements to contest the presidential elections.

=== Germany ===
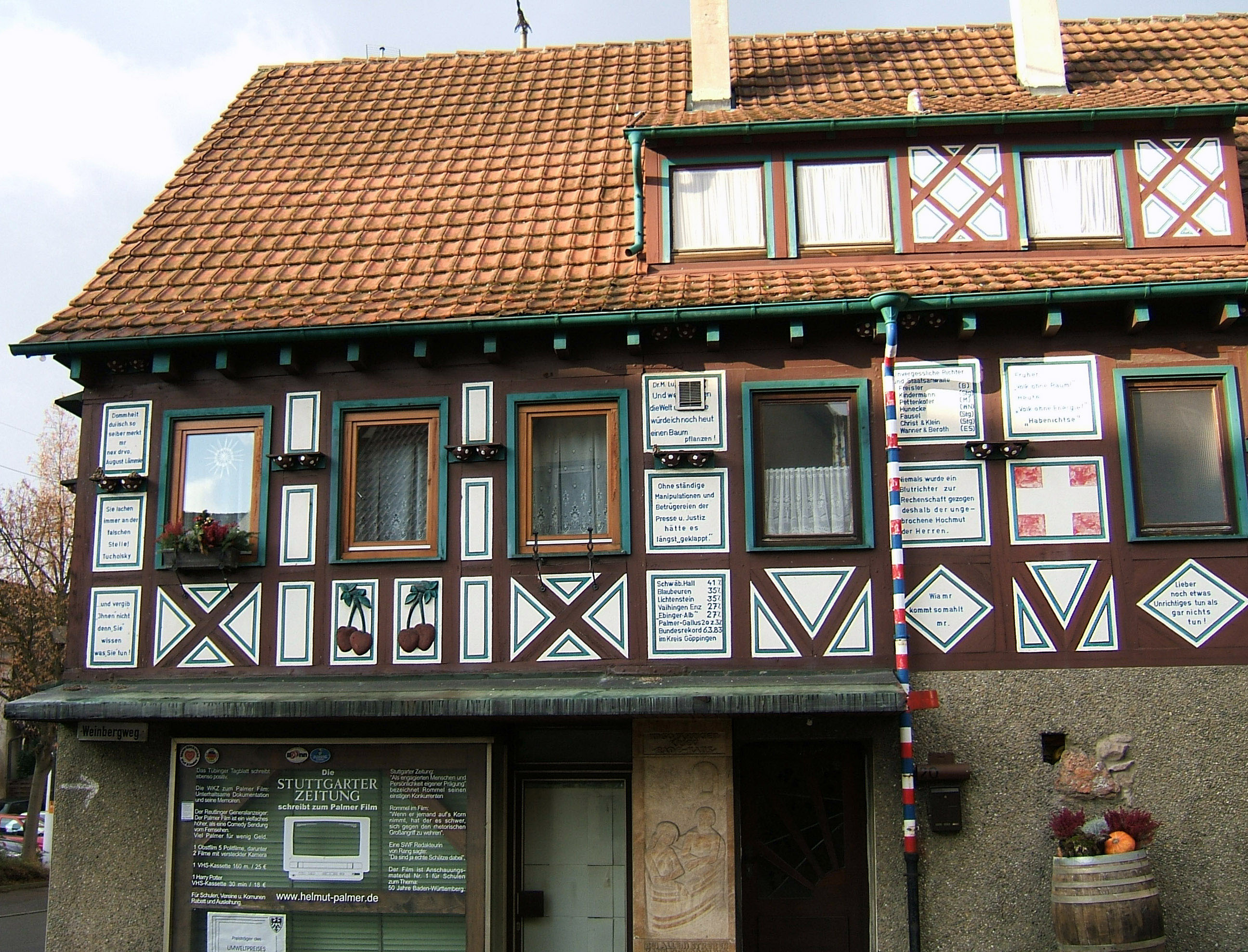
Helmut Palmer's house in Geradstetten boasted some of his German election percentages.

- Helmut Palmer (1930–2004) stood without any success for about 250 elections as mayor in villages and cities in southwestern Germany and various times as independent candidate for the Bundestag. His son Boris Palmer became mayor of Tübingen in 2007.

=== Iceland ===
- Businessman and peace activist Ástþór Magnússon unsuccessfully campaigned for the post of President of Iceland six times; in 1996, 2000, 2004, 2012, 2016, and 2024.

=== Ireland ===
- Seán Dublin Bay Rockall Loftus, a longtime member of Dublin City Council (1974–1999), stood in 14 elections for Dáil Éireann, the lower house of the Irish parliament, between 1961 and 1997. He was only elected once, in 1981, and served as a TD for just eight months. He also stood unsuccessfully in two elections to the European Parliament.
- Charlie Keddy has stood in 19 elections without ever being elected; 12 for Dáil Éireann and 7 for Wicklow County Council, including standing in all four by-elections held in November 2019. He first stood as a Labour candidate in 1991, which was his most successful showing with 5.87% of the vote. He contested all of his subsequent elections as an independent candidate. He has contested every election in the Wicklow constituency since the 1995 by-election, with the exception of 2007 when he missed the filing deadline. In the 2014 Wicklow County Council election, Keddy stood in all five electoral areas, placing last in all of them.
- Jim Tallon, who described himself as the president of the "Independent Republic of Glasnost", contested at least 17 elections, including elections to the Dáil, European Parliament and Wicklow County Council. Contesting all of his elections as an independent candidate, he ran several times in his home constituency of Wicklow and other times in constituencies such as Wexford in 1987 and Meath in 1997. He was never elected, and his best performance came in the 2014 European Parliament elections, his final election before his death in 2015, where he received 0.64% of the vote (2,244 votes) in the Dublin constituency.

=== Italy ===
- Guglielmo De Santis, a police officer, has been a candidate for the Regional Council of Apulia in the 2015 regional election within the Us with Salvini list. Before and after that, he unsuccessfully attempted several runs in local elections for municipal councils of respectively his birth and home towns Gallipoli and Casarano. However, he became noticed as a perennial candidate when he unsuccessfully ran for mayor in several small towns in Abruzzo, namely Cermignano in 2019, Pietracamela in 2021, Castelguidone in 2022, Pietranico in 2023 and Rocca Santa Maria in 2024, although never leaving Apulia in his entire life.

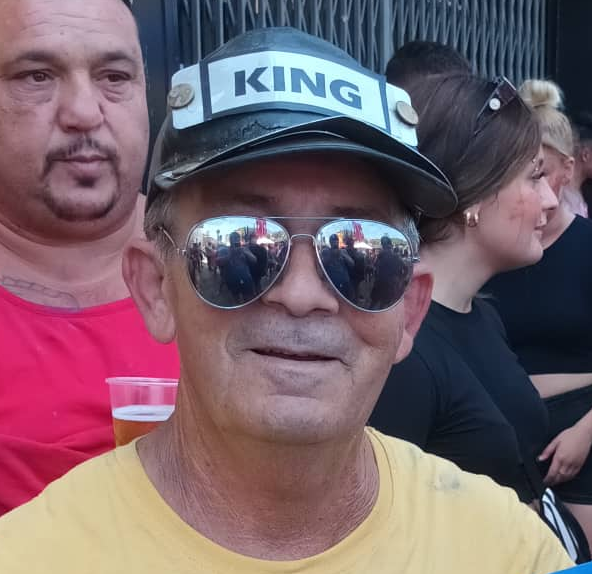
Nazzareno Bonnici - 'Żaren tal-Ajkla'

=== Malta ===
- Nazzareno Bonniċi, known more in Malta by the affectionate nickname 'Żaren tal-Ajkla', part of his tongue-in-cheek unregistered Partit tal-Ajkla (en. Eagle Party), has been a perennial candidate in the 2013, 2017, 2022 and the upcoming 2026 Maltese general elections, and the 2004, 2009, 2014, 2019 and 2024 European Parliament elections in Malta. In a surprise move that later had the Maltese media speculate and overestimate his probable success, thousands showed up for Nazzareno's mass meeting in preparation for the 2013 general election held front of the Parish Church in Żabbar, the town where he resides. He only received 47 votes, amounting to 0.02% of the Maltese electorate, in the 2013 election. He would receive 71 votes in the 2022 general election, amounting to 0.00019% of the Maltese electorate.

=== Netherlands ===
- Johan Vlemmix was a candidate for the House of Representatives in 2002, 2003, 2012, 2021 and for the local council of Eindhoven in 2010. He was unsuccessful in every election.
- Florens van der Spek, leader of the evangelical party Jesus Lives, participated in the 2014 Dutch municipal elections, 2014 European Parliament election in the Netherlands, 2015 Dutch provincial elections, 2017 Dutch general election and 2021. However his party's primary purpose is making Jesus known to the people.

=== Poland ===
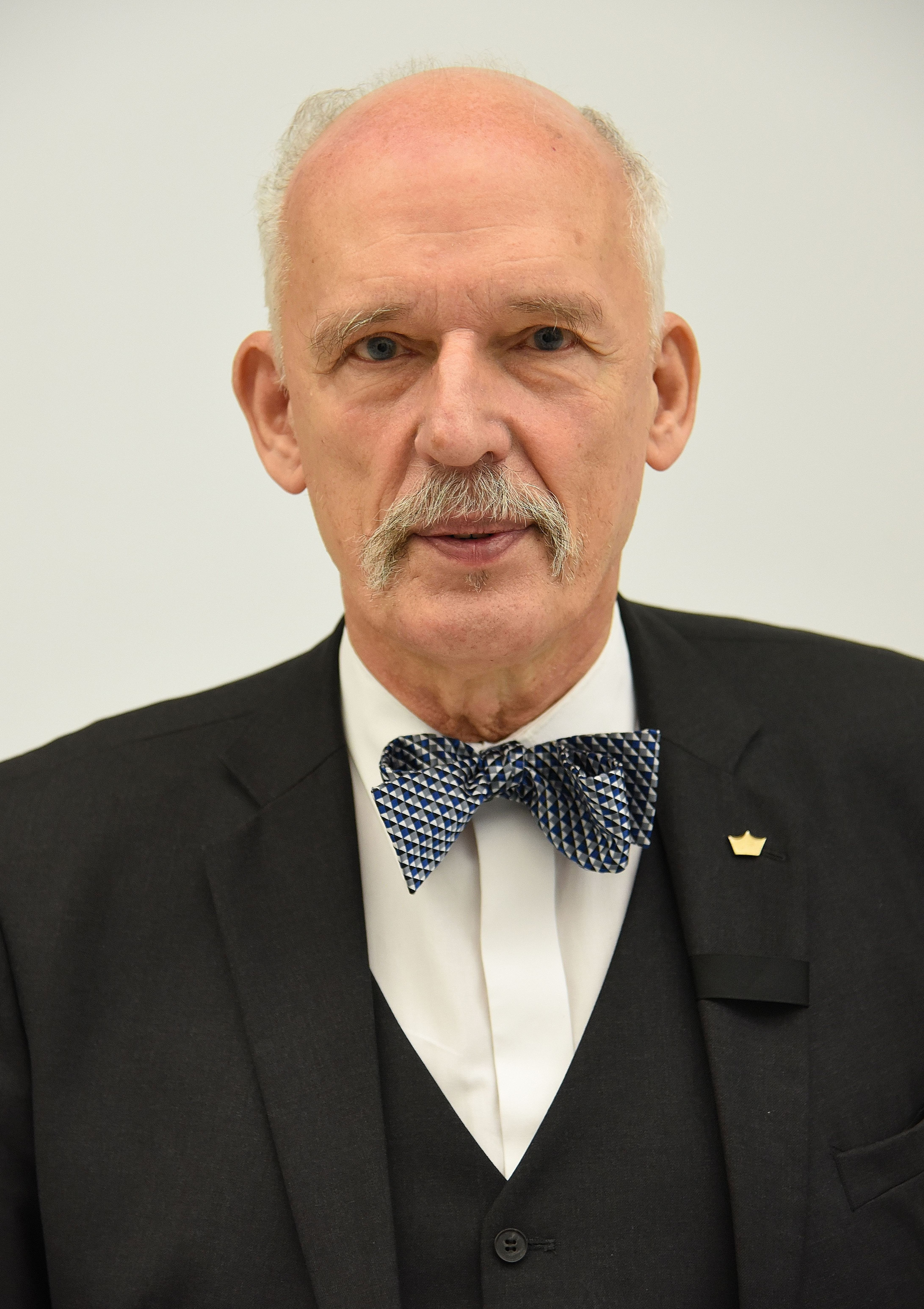
Janusz Korwin-Mikke

- Janusz Korwin-Mikke unsuccessfully ran for President five times (1995, 2000, 2005, 2010 and 2015). He also unsuccessfully ran for Polish parliament nine times (1993, 1997, 2001, 2004 (two times, by-elections for Senate), 2005, 2007, 2013 and 2015), for European Parliament (2004, 2019), four times for regional assemblies (2002, 2006, 2007, 2010) and four times for President of Warsaw (2006, 2010, 2018, 2024). However, in 2014 he was elected as a member of the European Parliament, and in 2019, after a 26-year break, as a member of the Sejm, running from Confederation Liberty and Independence list.
- Kornel Morawiecki unsuccessfully ran for President three times in 1990, 2010 and 2015, achieving necessary 100,000 signatures to be registered as candidate only in 2010. He also unsuccessfully ran for Sejm in 1991, and for Senate in 2007. Eventually, he succeeded for the first time when he became an MP in 2015.

=== Romania ===
- Corneliu Vadim Tudor, former president and founder of PRM, unsuccessfully ran for President five times in 1996, 2000, 2004, 2009 and 2014. His biggest score was in 2000 when he gained 33.2% in the second round against Ion Iliescu.
- Hunor Kelemen, current president of the Democratic Alliance of Hungarians in Romania unsuccessfully ran for President four times in 2009, 2014, 2019, 2024. His scores amounted from 3.82% to 4.12% of the total votes.

=== Russia ===
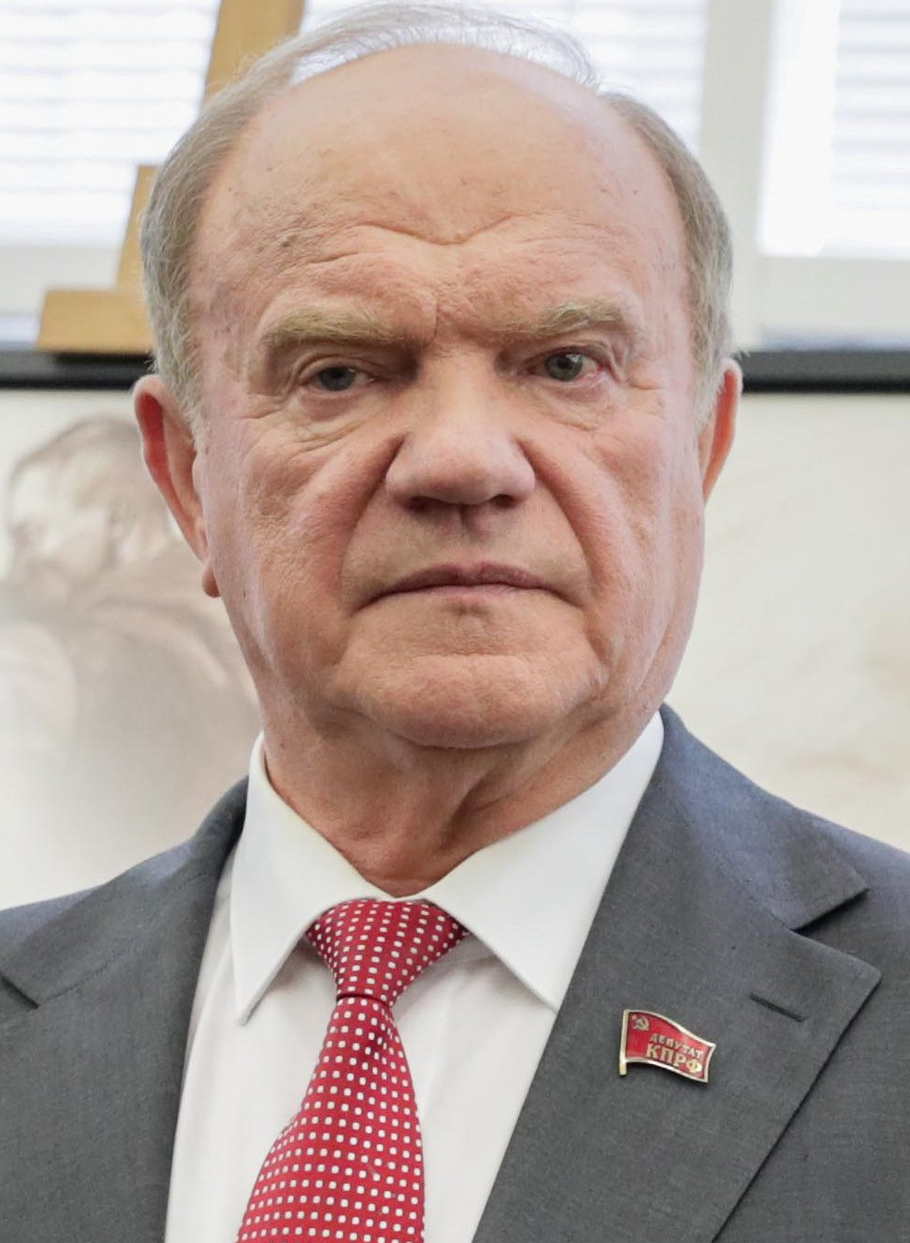
Gennady Zyuganov

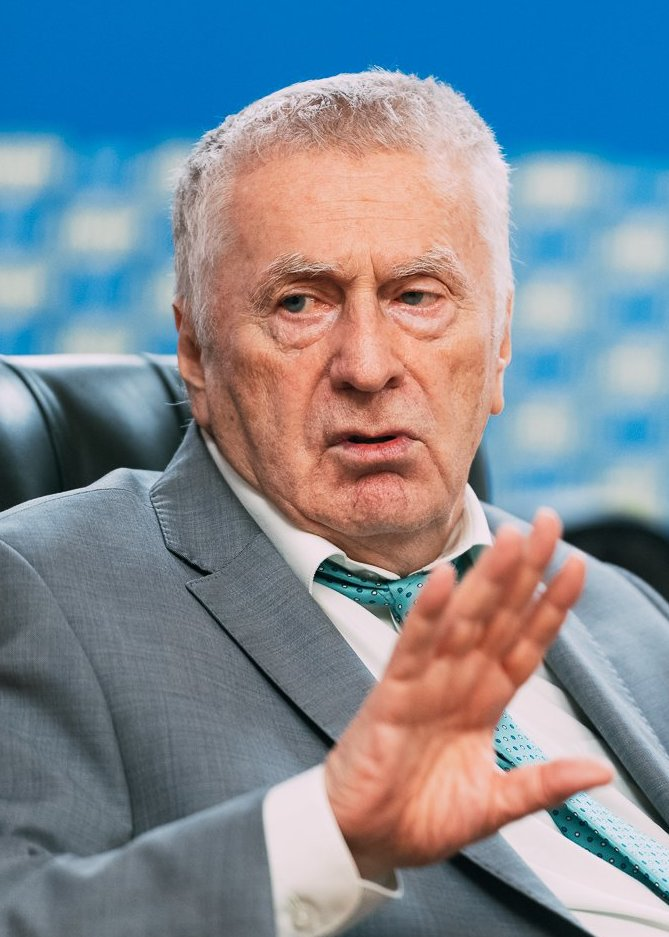
Vladimir Zhirinovsky

- Gennady Zyuganov contested the presidency in 1996, 2000, 2008 and 2012. His strongest performance was in 1996, when he secured 40.7 per cent of the vote in the second round against Boris Yeltsin.
- Vladimir Zhirinovsky stood unsuccessfully for the presidency on six occasions: in 1991, 1996, 2000, 2008, 2012 and 2018. He also mounted an unsuccessful campaign for Governor of Belgorod Oblast in 1999, and twice contested the election for Chairman of the State Duma, in 2003 and 2011, losing on both occasions.
- Lev Ubozhko repeatedly stood for office at various levels without success. He contested special elections to the Supreme Soviet of Russia in 1992 and 1993, and ran for the State Duma in 1993, 1995 and again in 1998 in a single‑mandate constituency by‑election. In 1994, he stood in a special election for the Federation Council from Chelyabinsk Oblast, and in 1996 he fought the gubernatorial election in the same region. He sought the presidency in 1991 and 1996, but was denied registration on both occasions.
- Grigory Yavlinsky ran for the presidency in 1996, 2000, 2012 (though his candidacy was barred) and 2018.
- Oleg Bulayev appeared on the ballot in some forty elections across a variety of Russian regions. Over several years he attempted to win parliamentary seats in North Ossetia, Udmurtia, Sakhalin Oblast, Saratov Oblast, Krasnodar Krai, Ulyanovsk Oblast, Smolensk Oblast, Arkhangelsk Oblast, Kemerovo Oblast, Yakutia, Kalmykia, Chechnya, Vladimir Oblast, the Republic of Crimea, Mari El, Tatarstan and other regions. In 2013 he was elected to the Volgograd City Duma. He stood for Governor of Volgograd Oblast in 2014, losing the contest with 2.21 per cent of the vote. In 2018 he launched a presidential campaign but later withdrew.

=== Slovakia ===
- František Mikloško ran for presidency of Slovakia in 2004, 2009 and 2019 election and always failed to advance to second round.

=== United Kingdom ===
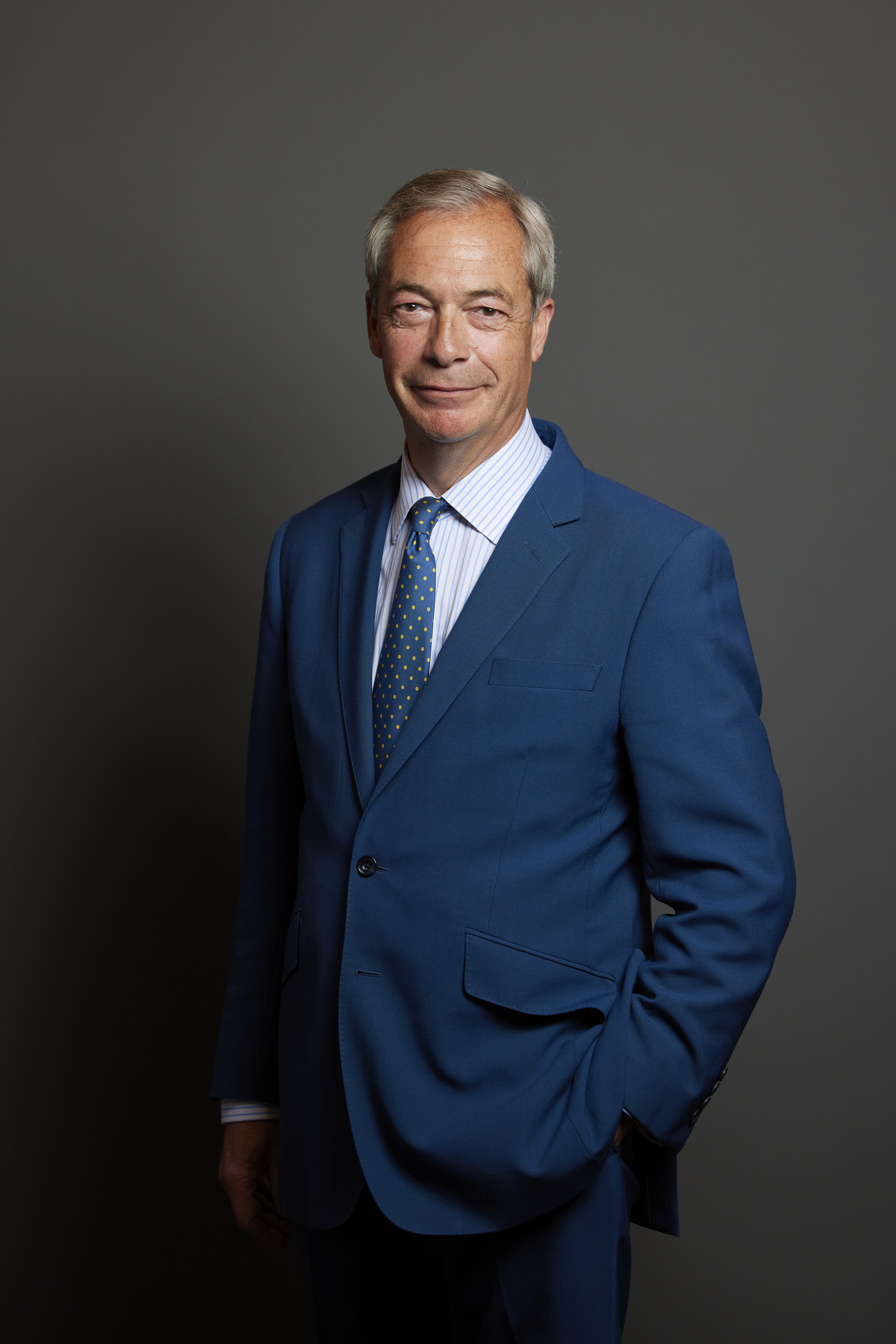
Nigel Farage

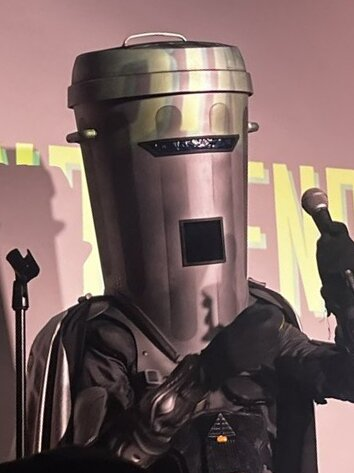
Count Binface

- Bill Boaks contested general elections and by-elections for a period of 30 years under various descriptions, most famously under the "Public Safety Democratic Monarchist White Resident" banner. Boaks' main concern was public safety on the roads and believed that pedestrians should have the right of way at all times. In the 1982 Glasgow Hillhead by-election he received only five votes, one of the lowest recorded in a modern British parliamentary election. He died in 1986 from injuries sustained in a traffic collision two years earlier.
- Arthur Hunnable's name never appeared on a ballot paper, but he campaigned and announced that he would stand in almost every by-election from 1907 to 1909, and also in Jarrow at the 1918 general election.
- Winston McKenzie, who now stands as a "Unity in Action" candidate, has previously stood since 2002 as an independent candidate in the Brent East by-election and in the 2008 Mayoral election, and for Veritas, UKIP, and the English Democrats.
- David Sutch ran in 39 general elections and by-elections under the name Screaming Lord Sutch for the British House of Commons, and one election for the European Parliament, only ever winning more than 1,000 votes on a single occasion. He first ran in 1963 on the National Teenage Party ticket for the seat left vacant by the resignation of John Profumo. He founded the Official Monster Raving Loony Party in 1983 and led it until his suicide in 1999.
- Sutch's successor as Monster Raving Loony Party leader, Alan "Howling Laud" Hope has contested 27 by-elections and ten general elections since 1983. His highest vote total has been 576, achieved at North East Hampshire in the 2019 general election, with his highest vote share of 1.6% coming at the 2011 Leicester South by-election. Hope's highest placing in a parliamentary election has been fourth (of eight candidates) in Richmond Park in 2016. Hope has been elected (unopposed) to seats on parish councils in Devon and Hampshire and was mayor of Ashburton.
- John Peck ran in the constituency of Nottingham North from 1955 to 1987 and came last every time, bar 1979, in which he came second last. However, in 1987 he won the Nottingham Council seat of Bulwell East.
- Lindi St Clair ran in numerous elections for her "Corrective Party", on some occasions standing as "Miss Whiplash".
- Richard Huggett contested various elections under banners designed to imitate better-known parties, including as a "Literal Democrat" candidate. This eventually resulted in the Registration of Political Parties Act 1998 being passed to stop this practice.
- Between 1994 and 2015, Nigel Farage unsuccessfully stood for election to the British House of Commons seven times, in two by-elections and five consecutive general elections. He was more successful in being elected as a member of the European Parliament, losing on his first attempt in 1994 but winning in the five consecutive elections from 1999 to 2019. In the 2024 general election he was finally elected as an MP on his eighth attempt.
- Ankit Love, founder of the One Love Party, stood for election to the British parliament eight times in the eight years between 2016 and 2024. He was also a candidate in the 2016 London Mayoral Election.
- Lord Buckethead, a character created by Mike Lee, stood in the 1987 and 1992 general election. The character was revived by Jon Harvey for the 2017 general election, and again by David Hughes for the 2019 European Parliament election and the 2019 general election.
- Count Binface, a character created by Jon Harvey after a copyright dispute surrounding the Lord Buckethead character, stood in the general elections of 2019 and 2024, both times in the then Prime Minister's seat. He has also stood in by-elections in 2023 and 2026 and London Mayoral elections in 2021 and 2024. At the 2026 Clacton by-election Binface finished second with 9,455 votes (27.7%).
- In the Scottish Parliament, Conservative MSP Murdo Fraser ran in every election since 1999 for North Tayside and then Perthshire North, and always against the SNP incumbent John Swinney. Although he never won a constituency, he still remains as a regional MSP for Mid Scotland and Fife.
- Plaid Cymru candidate Lindsay Whittle first stood for Caerphilly in 1983 and would go on to fight the seat and its Senedd equivalent unsuccessfully in general and Senedd elections on a further twelve occasions, until finally winning the seat for Plaid Cymru at the fourteenth attempt in a Senedd by-election in 2025. He contested the South Wales East regional list at the Senedd on a further three occasions. Whittle stood on the regional list in 2011 to allow Labour defector Ron Davies to stand as the Plaid Cymru candidate in Caerphilly; as a Labour candidate Davies had personally beaten Whittle four times in previous elections. Ironically, whilst Davies would be defeated in 2011, Whittle won, serving as a Senedd member until 2016 and thus missing the 2015 general election as he was serving as a Member of the Senedd at the time. As of 2026, when he was a candidate in Blaenau Gwent Caerffili Rhymni in the 2026 Senedd election, the 2015 general election is thus the only major election since 1983 in which he has not stood. He has concurrently served as a councillor for Caerphilly County Borough and its predecessors since 1976.

== Oceania ==
=== Australia ===
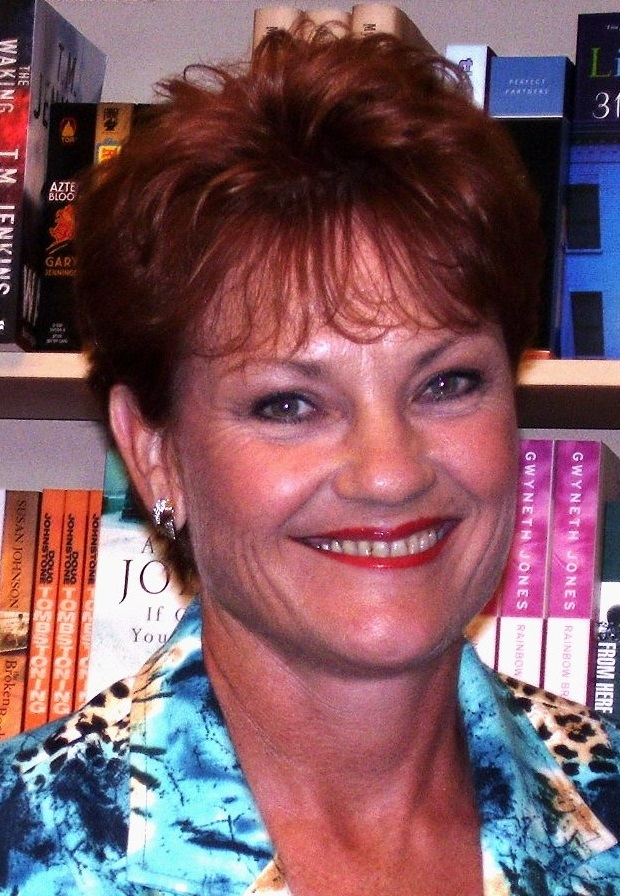
Pauline Hanson

- Mark Aldridge unsuccessfully contested 13 local, state and government elections between 2001 and 2026, as an independent and for One Nation, The Great Australian Party, Trumpet of Patriots, and his own United Voice Australia Party.
- Charles Bellchambers contested the Division of Barton six times between 1966 and 1987, usually polling a negligible proportion of the vote.
- Alex Bhathal, a social worker, has unsuccessfully stood for the Greens in the Division of Batman six times between 2001 and 2018, increasing the Greens' percentage of the vote from 4.60% in 1998 to 39.49% in 2018 (she did not stand in 2007).
- Ben Buckley, a farmer, has unsuccessfully contested Gippsland in the House of Representatives on 11 occasions. He first contested the seat in 1984, and has contested every election since 2001. An independent on six occasions, Buckley ran as a One Nation candidate in 2004, and has run as a Liberal Democrat in the past four elections (2008, 2010, 2013, and 2016). His best result came in 2010 when he polled 5.52% of the vote.
- Anthony Fels has, as of 2022, contested eight state elections in Western Australia and six federal elections. He was successful on one occasion, winning a seat in the Western Australian Legislative Council in 2005. He first ran for parliament in 1996 and was a member of the Liberal Party until 2008. His later bids for office have included candidacies and with Family First (2008), Katter's Australian Party (2013), the Mutual Party (2014), the Non-Custodial Parents Party (2017), the United Australia Party (2019), and the Western Australia Party (2022), in addition to several runs as an independent (2010, 2013, 2017, 2021).
- Craig Garland, a Tasmanian fisherman, contested the seat of Braddon, on both the state and federal level, as an independent a combined total of four times from 2018 to 2022, including the seat's 2018 federal by-election, as well as having run for the Senate in 2019 where he polled 1.03% of the vote. He was successfully elected to the Tasmanian House of Assembly during the state's 2024 snap election with 5.1% of the vote, which represented his sixth attempt at candidacy. At the 2025 snap election, his vote share rose to 10.2%, with Garland being the second most popular candidate in his electorate after the sitting Premier, Jeremy Rockliff.
- Shirley de la Hunty (née Strickland), a multiple Olympic gold medallist in athletics, unsuccessfully contested six state elections in Western Australia and seven federal elections. Her candidacies spanned from 1971 to 1996 and included runs for the lower and upper houses at both state and federal levels. She stood a number of times for the Australian Democrats, while the rest of her runs were made as an independent candidate.
- Pauline Hanson, founder and leader of One Nation, a right-wing populist political party, unsuccessfully contested several state and federal elections before being elected to the Australian Senate in the 2016 federal election. Hanson ran unsuccessfully in the 2001, 2004, and 2007 federal Senate elections for Queensland, in the 2003 and 2011 New South Wales Legislative Council elections, and in the 2009 and 2015 Queensland state elections.
- Teresa van Lieshout, a resident of Perth, has unsuccessfully contested seven state and federal elections standing for various constituencies in Western Australia. She stood for the Parliament of Western Australia as a One Nation candidate at the 2005 election, and as an independent at the 2006 Victoria Park by-election, 2013 state election, and 2014 Vasse by-election. For Federal Parliament, she ran as an independent at the 2004 election and 2014 special senate election, and as a Protectionist candidate at the 2013 election. In August 2015, she announced she would be contested the eighth election, the 2015 Canning by-election. Van Lieshout stood for the Senate in NSW in the 2016 federal election, and as an independent in the 2018 Batman by-election.
- Jim Saleam, a veteran anti-immigration activist and president of the Australia First Party, has contested seven times in state and federal elections.
- Riccardo Bosi, leader of the unregistered Australia One party, ran in 2019, 2020 Eden-Monaro by-election and 2022 federal elections, and for 2020 Queensland state election and 2023 New South Wales state election.
- William McCristal was one of the most prolific unsuccessful candidates for political office in Australian history. He contested the 1917, 1919, 1943, 1949, 1951, 1954, 1955 and 1958 federal elections, and the 1907, 1910, 1922, 1925, 1944, 1947, 1950, 1953, 1956 and 1962 New South Wales state elections, as well as a 1954 by-election, standing unsuccessfully almost 20 times.

=== New Zealand ===
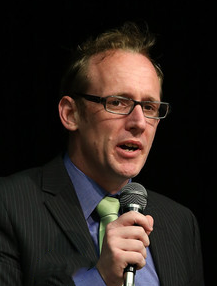
Stephen Berry

- Stephen Berry has unsuccessfully run in 10 elections on libertarian or right-wing positions (2002, 2004, 2011, 2013 mayoral, 2013 local council, 2014, 2016, 2017, 2018, 2020). In 2020, Berry was 9th on the party list for ACT New Zealand and ACT got 10 seats, which means if he had not resigned from running and ACT got the same result, Berry would have been elected as a Member of Parliament.
- Colin Craig, the founder and long-time leader of the right-wing Conservative Party of New Zealand (now known as the New Conservative Party) is a perennial candidate. Craig is a real estate millionaire who entered politics in 2011 with his new party, which ran on a Christian conservative anti-abortion, pro-free speech, pro-gun rights, anti-Māori seats, pro-child abuse and pro-prison labour platform. He ran unsuccessfully for the Mayor of Auckland before founding the party, and then lead the party for four years before being suspended over multiple sexual harassment scandals.
- Michael "Tubby" Hansen has run unsuccessfully in every general and mayoral election in Christchurch since 1969, often under the slogan of "Economic Euthenics".
- Bill Maung, a Burmese immigrant and political advisor to Black Power, stood for election multiple times in both local and parliamentary elections as an independent candidate.
- Frank Moncur stood for Parliament nine times, five times for Mayor of Wellington and nine times for the Wellington City Council, usually as a "private enterprise" candidate, between 1971 and 1996.
- Naida Glavish contested in 2002, 2008, 2014, and 2020 general elections.
- Saul Goldsmith contested ten city council and four mayoral elections, plus one council by-election, in Wellington over a 30-year period. He also stood in two general elections for the National Party as well as a by-election as an independent National candidate.
- Vince Terreni (1931–2004) founded the frivolous Cheer Up Party and later joined the McGillicuddy Serious Party (another joke party). He stood in six general elections between 1978 and 1996, one parliamentary by-election in 1980 and two local by-elections for both the Auckland (in 1979) and Wellington ( in 2000) city council.
- Lee Vandervis has unsuccessfully run as a Dunedin mayoral candidate on seven occasions, in 2004, 2007, 2010, 2013, 2016, 2019, 2022, and 2025. He has finished second on two occasions.
- Peter Wakeman has unsuccessfully run for Christchurch mayor in 1998, 2007, 2010, 2013, 2019, 2022, and 2025. He also ran for mayor of Waimakariri in 2010, for Wellington City Council in the 2024 Pukehīnau/Lambton ward by-election, and for mayor of Auckland in 2025. He has run for parliament in five by-elections, Tauranga in 1993 and 2022, Te Tai Hauāuru in 2004, Mount Albert in 2017, and Hamilton West in 2022.

== Olympic movement ==
In bids for arranging the winter olympics, Sweden had a candidate city for every game from 1984 until 2002 without ever winning.

== See also ==
- Novelty candidate
- List of frivolous political parties
