= Annette Georges =

Seychellois politician and lawyer

Annette Mary Solange Georges (born 1957) is a lawyer, Seychellois politician and the first leader of the Seychelles United Opposition Party.

== Biography ==
Annette Georges was born in Seychelles in 1957. She grew up in a family that was already involved in the politics of her country. Her father was a minister and a member of the Seychelles National Assembly on the ticket of Seychelles Democratic Party (SDP) that later metamorphosed into the SDP-SPUD after forming a coalition with the Seychelles People's Unity Party (SPUP).

She studied law in the United Kingdom and was called to the bar in 1980. Her first job upon return from the United Kingdom was a position in the office of the Attorney General. She rose through the ranks until she became deputy attorney general. In 1985, she was appointed to become a Magistrate.

Annette Georges was the founding member of Parti Seselwa, one of the first political parties to come into existence after Seychelles was declared a multi party state. Parti Seselwa later merged with two other opposition parties to form the United Opposition (UO) Party, of which she was the treasurer and leader. In 1994, Georges stepped down as leader, and Wavel Ramkalawan was elected as her successor.

Georges was the vice-presidential candidate of the Seychelles National Party for the 1998, 2001, and 2006 elections.
