= Vice-President of Seychelles =

Second highest political office in the Seychelles

Vice-President of the Republic of Seychelles
- Coat of arms of Seychelles

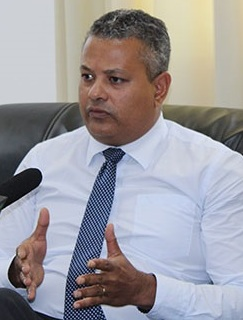
- Incumbent; Sebastien Pillay since 28 October 2025
- Residence: State House, Victoria, Mahé
- Inaugural holder: James Michel
- Formation: August 1996
- Salary: SR 35,000 monthly

The vice-president of Seychelles is the second highest political office in the Republic of Seychelles. The position was created in 1996.

== List of officeholders ==
Political parties

Seychelles People's Progressive Front (SPPF) → People's Party (PP) → United Seychelles (US)
Linyon Demokratik Seselwa (LDS)

No.	Portrait	Name (Birth–Death)	Elected	Term of office			Political party
No.	Portrait	Name (Birth–Death)	Elected	Took office	Left office	Time in office	Political party
1		James Michel (born 1944)	1998; 2001	18 August 1996	14 July 2004 (Note: Succeeded René as President.) (Became president)	7 years, 331 days	SPPF
2		Joseph Belmont (1947–2022)	2006	14 July 2004	30 June 2010 (Retired)	5 years, 351 days	SPPF until 2009 renamed to PP
3		Danny Faure (born 1962)	2011; 2015	1 July 2010	16 October 2016 (Note: Succeeded Michel as President.) (Became president)	6 years, 107 days	PP
4		Vincent Meriton (born 1959)	—	28 October 2016	27 October 2020	3 years, 364 days	PP until 2018 renamed to US
5		Ahmed Afif (born 1967)	2020	27 October 2020	26 October 2025	4 years, 364 days	LDS
6		Sebastien Pillay (born 1978)	2025	28 October 2025	Incumbent	315 days	United Seychelles

== See also ==
- History of Seychelles
- Politics of Seychelles
- List of colonial governors and administrators of Seychelles
- List of presidents of Seychelles
- Prime Minister of Seychelles
