= 2011 Seychellois presidential election =

- 19–21 May 2011
- Registered: 69,480
- Turnout: 85.26
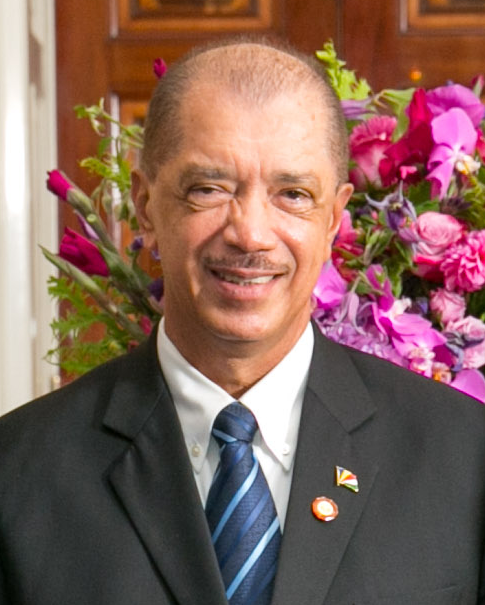

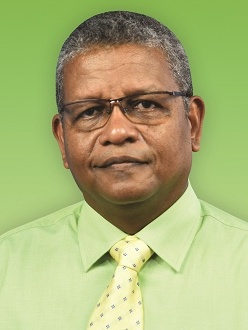
Nominee	James Michel	Wavel Ramkalawan
Party	People's Party	SNP
Running mate	Danny Faure	Nicholas Prea
Popular vote	31,966	23,878
Percentage	55.46%	41.43%
- Results by district.
President before election
James Michel
People's Party
Elected President
James Michel
People's Party

Presidential elections were held in the Seychelles between 19 and 21 May 2011, commencing on the Outer Islands on 19 May, with Inner Islands voting on 20 May and Mahé on 21 May. The result was a victory for incumbent President James Michel of the Seychelles People's Progressive Front, who received 55% of the vote in the first round.

== Background ==
The 2011 elections in Seychelles were the fifth round of democratic elections since the country became an independent republic and separated from the United Kingdom. The elections included the same candidates that ran in the 2006 election as well as Ralph Volcere, who ran with the New Democratic Party. Incumbent president James Michel originally came to power in 2004, assuming the role of president once former president France-Albert René, who had been the head of state of the Seychelles since 1977, stepped down. James Michel won the 2006 presidential election with 53.7% of the vote. The election was the third attempt by opposition candidateWavel Ramkalawan to gain the presidency. Ramkalawan had been involved in Seychelles politics since 1991 when France-Albert Rene reinstituted multi-party democracy in the country, after 12 years of the country’s constitution only allowed members of the Seychelles People’s Progressive Front to run in elections. Ramkalawan, formerly a priest, formed the Parti Seselwa in 1991, which in 1992 was the first party to register in opposition to the Parti Lepep government.

The 2011 elections were the first democratic elections in the country since the 2008 financial crisis.

== Electoral system ==
The President of Seychelles is elected using the two-round system.

== Candidates ==
The election was contested by four candidates;

- The Parti Lepep leader, James Michel was the winner of the election and president of Seychelles from 2004 to 2016. He ran with incumbent vice president Danny Faure as his running mate. Michel previously served as a member of the Executive Committee of the Seychelles People's United Party from 1974 to 1977; member of the Central Executive Committee for the Seychelles People's Progressive Front (SPPF); and SPPF's Deputy Secretary-General, then Secretary General. Michel oversaw significant economic growth based on tourism and fishery industrialization and a proponent of democratic governance and free market economics.
- Philippe Boullé, ran as an independent candidate, with Henry Naiken as his running mate, having also run in the 2001 and 2006 presidential elections. Boullé was educated at the Seychelles College, after which he studied Economics at the University of Natal in South Africa and returned to Seychelles to study law. He obtained his L.L.B of the University of London and has since been a practicing attorney and barrister.
- Wavel Ramkalawan, the current Leader of the Opposition, who achieved 45% of the popular vote in the last presidential election in 2006, a significant increase over the last two presidential elections for which he stood as a candidate for the Seychelles National Party (SNP); his running mate in Nicholas Prea, an elected member of the Seychelles National assembly, representing the District of Bel Ombre. Prea has been elected Member for Belombre for more than a decade.
- Ralph Volcere, running for the first time, as a representative of the New Democratic Party, with his running mate Georges Bibi, a former Member of the Seychelles National Assembly (representing the Seychelles Democratic Party, which renamed itself the New Democratic Party).

== Campaign ==
The opposition parties did not hold any official campaign rallies for the election, reporting that they both had a lack of resources to hold the rallies and feared for the safety of their followers. The opposition parties also claimed that the People's Party attempted to intimidate and bribe their supporters. Campaigning by opposition parties was conducted largely through door-to-door canvassing, political broadcasts provided for through the public broadcaster, in the private print media and on billboards. No candidate reported any impediments to their activities.

Michel stated in his manifesto that he would aim "secure continued growth so all Seychellois can prosper". Boullé said that the public should be given more control of the economy. Ramkalawan called for native Seychellois to be given favourable economic treatment, whilst Volcere said the NDP would " improve the ability of employees and businesses to compete and maintain a stable low-inflation economy".

== Conduct ==
The elections were reviewed by independent observers from the Southern African Development Community, La Francophonie and the Commonwealth Secretariat. Local independent NGO groups applied for accreditation as observers, given their understanding of the Creole language and their knowledge of districts and past polling concerns. However, the Electoral Commissioner denied observer status to all local observer applicants.

The Electoral Institute for Sustainable Democracy in Africa highlighted some concerns in its technical assessment team report. While impressed with the efficient and peaceful nature of the presidential election, they also provided recommendations designed to address a lack of transparency, institutional and media bias in favor of the incumbent party, tension between the ruling party and the opposition, and a gender disparity that limits women’s ability to hold key decision-making positions in government.

== Results ==
Incumbent candidate James Michel of the People’s Party (PL) ultimately won the 2011 presidential election with 55.46% of the vote. 31,966 votes were cast for him. Wavel Ramkalawan, of the Seychelles National Party (SNP), garnered 41.43% of the vote. 23,878 votes were cast for him. Philippe Boullé, who ran independent of any party, earned 1.66% of the vote while Ralph Volcère of the New Democratic Party earned 1.45%. This corresponds to only 956 and 833 votes respectively. These percentages are calculated out of the total number of valid votes. 59,242 total votes were cast out of a pool of 69,480 registered voters. This indicates an 85.3% voter turnout. 1609 or 2.7% of total votes cast were invalid, putting the total number of valid votes cast at 57,633.

Candidate	Running mate	Party	Votes	%
James Michel	Danny Faure	People's Party	31,966	55.46
Wavel Ramkalawan	Nicholas Prea	Seychelles National Party	23,878	41.43
Philippe Boullé	Henry Naiken	Independent	956	1.66
Ralph Volcère	Georges Bibi	New Democratic Party	833	1.45
Total			57,633	100.00
Valid votes			57,633	97.28
Invalid/blank votes			1,609	2.72
Total votes			59,242	100.00
Registered voters/turnout			69,480	85.26
Source: Psephos

== Aftermath ==
The Seychellois public was relatively satisfied with the election results, as evidenced by the lack of violence in the post-election celebrations, which took place in the streets across the Seychellois islands. However, there was significant and unanimous pushback from the opposition leaders, who believed the election to have been unfairly biased in favor of the ruling party. When the results of the presidential election were announced on 22 May, the three opposition candidates refused to attend as a means of protest. This was the first time in the history of Seychellois elections that a protest of this nature had taken place, and so was viewed as a significant statement.
