= Joseph Belmont =

Seychellois politician (1947–2022)

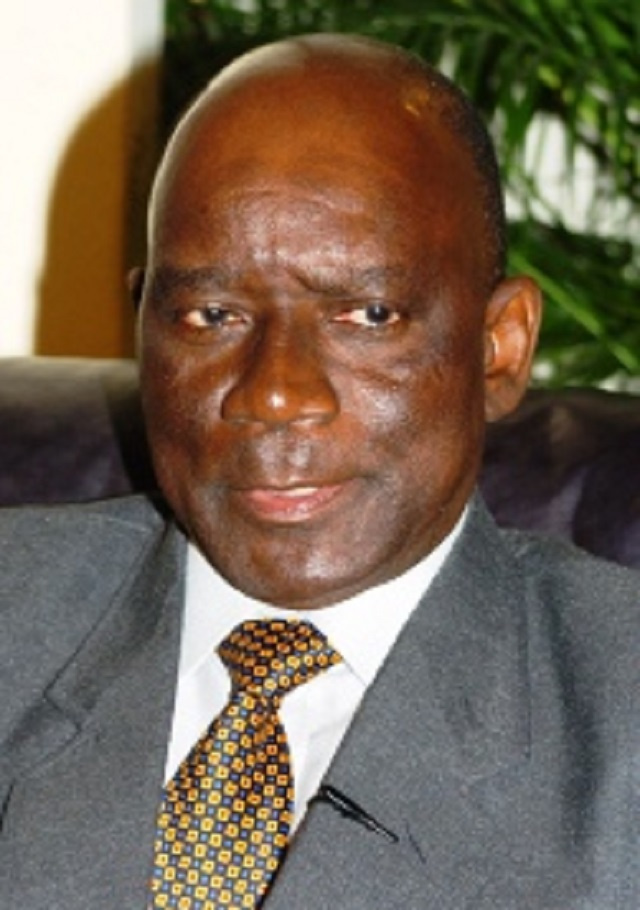

2nd Vice President of Seychelles
- In office 14 July 2004 – 30 June 2010
- President: James Michel
- Preceded by: James Michel
- Succeeded by: Danny Faure

Personal details
- Born: 1 June 1947 Mahé, Seychelles
- Died: 28 January 2022 (aged 74) Victoria, Seychelles
- Party: People’s Party

Joseph Belmont (1 June 1947 – 28 January 2022) was a Seychellois politician who was the Vice President of the Seychelles from 14 July 2004 until his retirement on 30 June 2010. He took office after President France-Albert René stepped down and the previous vice-president, James Michel, replaced René as president. Belmont was one of the leading members of the Seychelles People's Progressive Front (SPPF).

== Life and career ==
Belmont was born on 1 June 1947 in Grand Anse on the island of Mahé. He studied agronomic engineering at the University of Madagascar in Antananarivo, graduating in 1970. He then completed a Master of Science in Tropical Agricultural Development from the University of Reading in 1975.

Belmont was Minister for Labour and Social Security from 1982 to 1985. During the subsequent ten years, he was Minister of Manpower and Social Services on two occasions, as well as Minister of Health and Social Services and Minister of Administration and Manpower. He was Second Designated Minister and Minister for Administration and Manpower from 1993 to 1996, then became Designated Minister and Minister for Administration and Manpower in 1996. After serving as Minister for Industries and International Business from 1998 to 1999, he was moved to the position of Minister of Housing and Land Use in a December 1999 cabinet reshuffle. After four years in the latter position, he was appointed Minister of Tourism and Transport in January 2004; soon afterward, in July 2004, he became vice-president, while also holding the Tourism, Transport and Public Administration portfolios. Later, he was assigned the portfolios of Internal Affairs, Public Administration and Tourism.

In 1992, Belmont served as the chairman of the new constitutional commission. In the July 2006 presidential election, in which Michel was victorious, Belmont ran as his vice-presidential candidate.

=== Later life and death ===
Belmont retired in 2010 from politics. He was succeeded as vice president by Danny Faure.

Belmont died at a hospital in Victoria, on 28 January 2022, at the age of 74.

== Honours ==
- Officier, Legion of Honour (22 May 2000)

Political offices
Preceded by James Michel	Vice President of Seychelles; 2004–2010	Succeeded by Danny Faure
