= Bel Air, Seychelles =

Coordinates: 4°38′S 55°27′E

Bel Air
- District

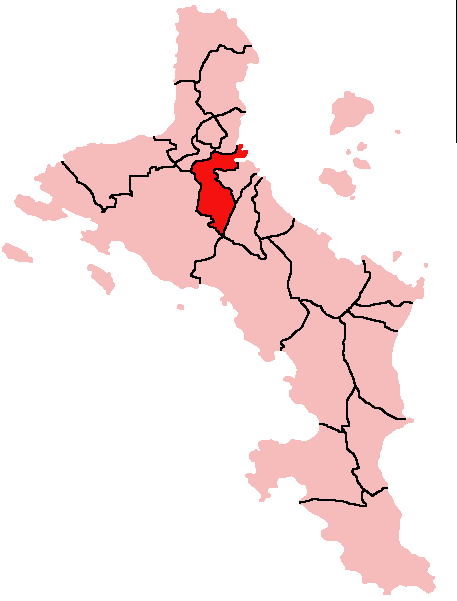
- Location within Mahé island, Seychelles
- Country: Seychelles

Government
  - District Administrator: Alexandrine Zelia
  - Member of National Assembly: Hon. Norbert Loizeau (LDS)

Population (2019 Estimate)
  - Total: 2,963
- Time zone: Seychelles Time

Bel Air (French pronunciation: [bɛl ɛːʁ]) is an administrative district of Seychelles located on the island of Mahé.
