= List of presidents of Seychelles =

President of the Republic of Seychelles
- Président de la république des Seychelles (French); Prezidan Larepiblik Sesel (Northern East Cree)
- Presidential Standard

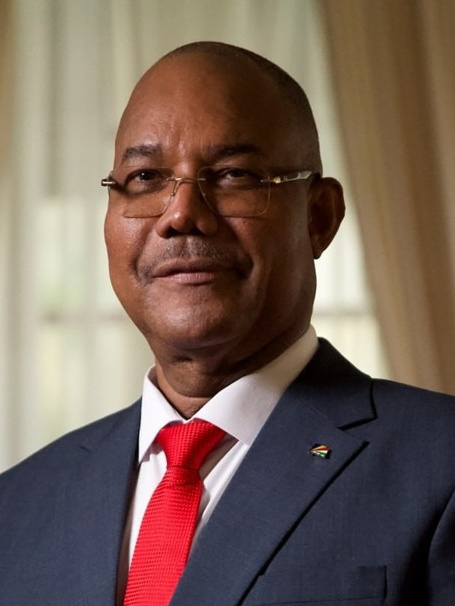
- Incumbent; Patrick Herminie since 26 October 2025
- Type: Head of state; Head of government
- Residence: State House, Victoria, Mahé
- Term length: Five years, renewable once
- Constituting instrument: Constitution of Seychelles (1993)
- Formation: 29 June 1976; 50 years ago
- First holder: James Mancham
- Deputy: Vice-President of Seychelles
- Salary: SR 94,000 / US$6,896 monthly
- Website: Official website

This article contains a list of presidents of the Republic of Seychelles.

== Term limits ==
As of 2021, there is a two-term limit for the president in the Constitution of Seychelles. The term limit has not been met by any president yet.

== List of officeholders ==
Political parties

Seychelles Democratic Party (SDP)
Seychelles People's United Party (SPUP) → Seychelles People's Progressive Front (SPPF) → People's Party (PP) → United Seychelles (US)
Seychelles National Party (SNP)

Symbols

^{§} Elected unopposed

No.	Portrait	Name (Birth–Death)	Term of office			Political party (Coalition)	Elected	Cabinet(s)	Vice-President(s)	Ref.
No.	Portrait	Name (Birth–Death)	Took office	Left office	Time in office	Political party (Coalition)	Elected	Cabinet(s)	Vice-President(s)	Ref.
1		Sir James Mancham (1939–2017)	29 June 1976	5 June 1977 (Deposed in a coup)	341 days	Seychelles Democratic Party	—	Mancham	—N/a	
2		France-Albert René (1935–2019)	5 June 1977	14 July 2004 (Resigned)	27 years, 39 days	Seychelles People's United Party	—		—N/a	
2		France-Albert René (1935–2019)	5 June 1977	14 July 2004 (Resigned)	27 years, 39 days	Seychelles People's Progressive Front	1979^{[§]}		—N/a	
2		France-Albert René (1935–2019)	5 June 1977	14 July 2004 (Resigned)	27 years, 39 days	Seychelles People's Progressive Front	1984^{[§]}		—N/a	
2		France-Albert René (1935–2019)	5 June 1977	14 July 2004 (Resigned)	27 years, 39 days	Seychelles People's Progressive Front	1989^{[§]}		James Michel	
2		France-Albert René (1935–2019)	5 June 1977	14 July 2004 (Resigned)	27 years, 39 days	Seychelles People's Progressive Front	1993		James Michel	
2		France-Albert René (1935–2019)	5 June 1977	14 July 2004 (Resigned)	27 years, 39 days	Seychelles People's Progressive Front	1998		James Michel	
2		France-Albert René (1935–2019)	5 June 1977	14 July 2004 (Resigned)	27 years, 39 days	Seychelles People's Progressive Front	2001		James Michel	
3		James Michel (born 1944)	14 July 2004	16 October 2016 (Resigned)	12 years, 94 days	Seychelles People's Progressive Front	–		Joseph Belmont	
3		James Michel (born 1944)	14 July 2004	16 October 2016 (Resigned)	12 years, 94 days	Seychelles People's Progressive Front	2006		Joseph Belmont	
3		James Michel (born 1944)	14 July 2004	16 October 2016 (Resigned)	12 years, 94 days	People's Party	2011		Danny Faure	
3		James Michel (born 1944)	14 July 2004	16 October 2016 (Resigned)	12 years, 94 days	People's Party	2015		Danny Faure	
4		Danny Faure (born 1962)	16 October 2016	26 October 2020	4 years, 10 days	People's Party	—	Faure	Vincent Meriton	
4		Danny Faure (born 1962)	16 October 2016	26 October 2020	4 years, 10 days	United Seychelles	—	Faure	Vincent Meriton	
5		Wavel Ramkalawan (born 1961)	26 October 2020	26 October 2025	5 years	Seychelles National Party (LDS)	2020	Ramkalawan	Ahmed Afif	
6		Patrick Herminie (born 1963)	26 October 2025	Incumbent	357 days	United Seychelles	2025	Herminie	Sebastien Pillay	

== Timeline ==
This is a graphical lifespan timeline of the presidents of Seychelles. They are listed in order of first assuming office.

The following chart lists presidents by lifespan (living presidents on the green line), with the years outside of their presidency in beige.

The following chart shows presidents by their age (living presidents in green), with the years of their presidency in blue.

== Latest election ==
Candidate	Party	First round		Second round	
Candidate	Party	Votes	%	Votes	%
Patrick Herminie	United Seychelles	30,736	48.83	34,389	52.73
Wavel Ramkalawan	Linyon Demokratik Seselwa	29,230	46.44	30,823	47.27
Maarco Francis	Seychelles United Movement	1,329	2.11		
Robert Moumou	Seychelles People's National Movement	593	0.94		
Alain St Ange	Lalyans Nouvo Sesel	513	0.82		
Charles De Clarisse	Independent	253	0.40		
Ralph Volcère	Independent	217	0.34		
Kisna Louise	Independent	68	0.11		
Total		62,939	100.00	65,212	100.00
Valid votes		62,939	97.11	65,212	97.59
Invalid/blank votes		1,870	2.89	1,607	2.41
Total votes		64,809	100.00	66,819	100.00
Registered voters/turnout		77,045	84.12	77,045	86.73
Source: ECS, ECS

== See also ==
- History of Seychelles
- Politics of Seychelles
- List of colonial governors and administrators of Seychelles
- Vice-President of Seychelles
- First Lady of Seychelles
- Prime Minister of Seychelles
