= 2001 Seychellois presidential election =

| ← 1998 | 31 August–2 September 2001 | 2006 → |
- Registered: 59,994
- Turnout: 85.25%
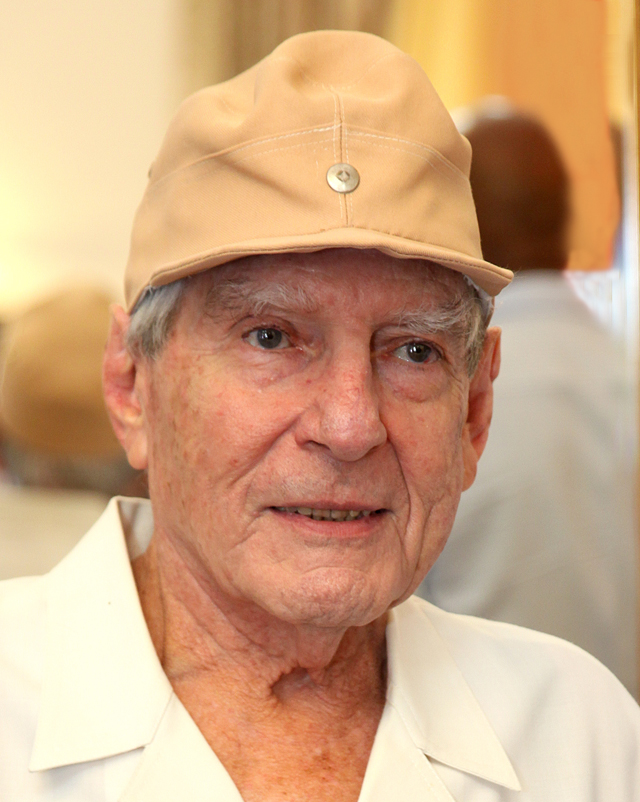

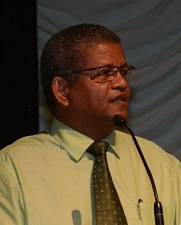
| Nominee | France-Albert René | Wavel Ramkalawan |
| Party | FPPS | SNP |
| Running mate | James Michel | Annette Georges |
| Popular vote | 27,223 | 22,581 |
| Percentage | 54.19% | 44.95% |
- Results by district
President before election
France-Albert René
FPPS
Elected President
France-Albert René
FPPS

Presidential elections were held in Seychelles on 31 August and 2 September 2001. They were won by the incumbent president, France-Albert René, who beat his nearest rival Wavel Ramkalawan by just under 5,000 votes.

== Results ==
| Candidate | Running mate | Party | Votes | % |
|---|---|---|---|---|
| France-Albert René | James Michel | Seychelles People's Progressive Front | 27,223 | 54.19 |
| Wavel Ramkalawan | Annette Georges | Seychelles National Party | 22,581 | 44.95 |
| Philippe Boullé | Guy Morel | Independent | 434 | 0.86 |
| Total | | | 50,238 | 100.00 |
| Valid votes | | | 50,238 | 98.23 |
| Invalid/blank votes | | | 907 | 1.77 |
| Total votes | | | 51,145 | 100.00 |
| Registered voters/turnout | | | 59,994 | 85.25 |
Source: African Elections Database
