= Constitution of Seychelles =

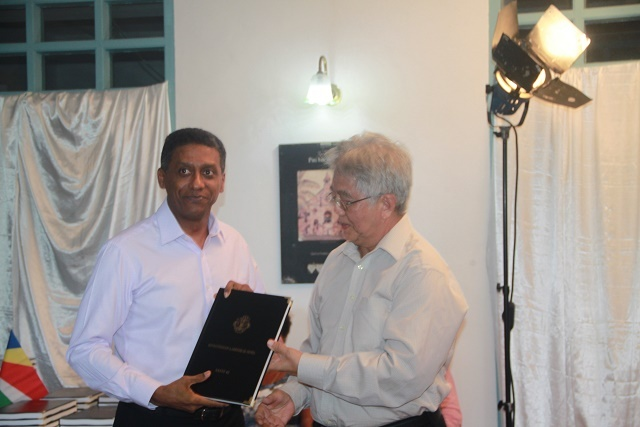

Overview
- Jurisdiction: Seychelles
- Ratified: 18 June 1993
- Date effective: 23 June 1993
- System: Presidential republic
- Chambers: National Assembly
- Executive: President of Seychelles
- Judiciary: Supreme Court of Seychelles
- Supersedes: Constitution of Seychelles (1979)

The Constitution of Seychelles (Seselwa Creole French: Konstitisyon Sesel, French: Constitution des Seychelles) is the governing document of the Republic of Seychelles.

18 June, the anniversary of its ratification, is celebrated in Seychelles as "Constitution Day". Until 2015, it was also considered Seychelles' National Day, which now corresponds to the nation's Seychelles' Independence Day.

== History ==
Following a successful referendum on 26 March 1979, a new constitution for the country, drafted by Philip Telford Georges, went into effect. This constitution made Seychelles a one-party state with the sole candidate for president nominated by the ruling party.

Towards the end of 1991, Seychelles began a process to become a multi-party democracy. Discussions and public debates between the major political parties (namely the Seychelles People's Progressive Front and Seychelles Democratic Party) began to take place in January 1993. Following a referendum which took place on 18 June 1993, the current constitution of Seychelles was approved. Up until 2022, it had received 10 amendments, passed by National Assembly and reviewed by the Constitutional Court. The 10th amendment, issued in 2022, was the only one questioned until that point, particularly by the Seychelles Human Rights Commission, the Ombudsman and the Bar Association of Seychelles.
