= Nicholas Prea =

Seychellois politician

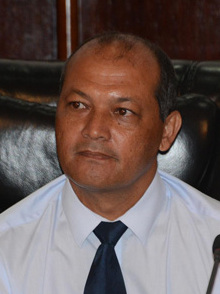

Speaker of the National Assembly of Seychelles
- In office 6 March 2018 – 28 October 2020
- Preceded by: Patrick Pillay
- Succeeded by: Roger Mancienne

Deputy Speaker of the National Assembly of Seychelles
- In office unknown – 6 March 2018
- Succeeded by: Ahmed Afif

Personal details
- Born: Seychelles
- Party: Seychelles National Party

Nicholas Prea is a speaker of the National Assembly of the Seychelles. An engineer by profession, he is a member of the Seychelles National Party.

Prea was first elected to the Assembly in 2002. He was elected Speaker of the National Assembly in March 2018 and served until 28 October 2020. Prea was secretary general of the Seychelles National Party until his resignation on 17 February 2020. He's no longer with the party now
