= 1993 Seychellois general election =

- 20–23 July 1993
- Registered: 50,370
- Presidential election
- Turnout: 86.53%
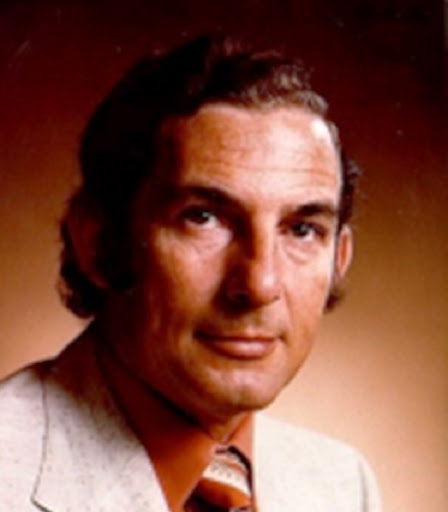

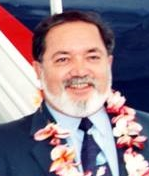
Nominee	France-Albert René	James Mancham
Party	FPPS	Democratic
Popular vote	25,627	15,815
Percentage	59.50%	36.72%
- Results by constituency.
President before election
France-Albert René
FPPS
Elected President
France-Albert René
FPPS
- Legislative election
- 20–23 July 1993
Party	Leader	Vote %	Seats	+/–
FPPS	France-Albert René	57.48	27	+4
SDP	James Mancham	32.80	5	New
UO	Philippe Boullé	9.71	1	New
This lists parties that won seats. See the complete results below.
Results by constituency.

General elections were held in the Seychelles between 20 and 23 July 1993 following the approval of a new constitution in a referendum on 18 June. They were the first-ever multi-party elections for President and the first multi-party election for the National Assembly since 1974. The Assembly was increased from 22 to 33 seats by the addition of 11 seats to be elected by proportional representation in addition to the 22 constituency seats.

The ruling Seychelles People's Progressive Front, which had previously been the sole legal party, won both elections, taking 27 of the 33 seats in the National Assembly, whilst its leader, France-Albert René, won the presidential election. The other two parties to contest the election were the Seychelles Democratic Party, which won five seats, and the United Opposition, an alliance of the Seselwa Party, the Seychelles National Party and the National Alliance Party), which won one. Voter turnout was 86.5%.

== Results ==
=== President ===
Candidate	Party	Votes	%
France-Albert René	Seychelles People's Progressive Front	25,627	59.50
James Mancham	Seychelles Democratic Party	15,815	36.72
Philippe Boullé	United Opposition	1,631	3.79
Total		43,073	100.00
Valid votes		43,073	98.83
Invalid/blank votes		511	1.17
Total votes		43,584	100.00
Registered voters/turnout		50,370	86.53
Source: African Elections Database

=== National Assembly ===
Party	Votes	%	Seats			
Party	Votes	%	FPTP	PR	Total	
Seychelles People's Progressive Front	24,642	57.48	21	6	27	+4
Seychelles Democratic Party	14,062	32.80	1	4	5	New
United Opposition	4,163	9.71	0	1	1	New
Total	42,867	100.00	22	11	33	+8
Valid votes	42,866	98.36				
Invalid/blank votes	713	1.64				
Total votes	43,579	100.00				
Registered voters/turnout	50,370	86.52				
Source: African Elections Database (Note: The official results reported a total of 42,866 valid votes, one less than the total number of votes received by each party.)
