= Norbert Loizeau =

Seychelles engineer and politician

- Occupations: Politician, engineer
- Years active: 2007

Norbert Loizeau is a Seychelles engineer and politician. member of the National Assembly of Seychelles. he is a member of the Seychelles National Party, and was first elected to the Assembly in 2007.
