= Electoral history of Mohammad Bagher Ghalibaf =

List of elections featuring Mohammad Bagher Ghalibaf as a candidate

This is a summary of the electoral history of Mohammad Bagher Ghalibaf, an Iranian Principlist politician who is Mayor of Tehran since 2005.

== Mayoral of Tehran ==
City Council of Tehran elected Ghalibaf as Mayor on three consecutive terms.

=== 2005 ===
| Candidate | Votes | % |
|---|---|---|
| Mohammad Bagher Ghalibaf | 8 / 15 | 53.33 |
| Other Candidates (total) | 7 / 15 | 47.66 |

=== 2007 ===
The election was exhaustive due to high number of candidates. In first and second rounds, every elector was able to cast two votes to two candidates. In next rounds, every voter had 1 vote to cast. The result of round 3 run-off, was repeated twice. Lost candidates in first round include Nasrin Soltankhah, Tahmasb Mazaheri and Ali Abdolalizadeh among others.

| Round | Candidate | Votes | % |
|---|---|---|---|
| 1 | Mohammad Bagher Ghalibaf | 10 / 15 | 33.33 |
| 1 | Hassan Bayadi | 10 / 15 | 33.33 |
| 1 | Amir Reza Khadem | 9 / 15 | 30 |
| 1 | Mohammad Saeedikia | 6 / 15 | 20 |
| 1 | 12 Other Candidates | <6 | - |
| 2 | Mohammad Bagher Ghalibaf | 8 / 15 | 26.66 |
| 2 | Amir Reza Khadem | 8 / 15 | 26.66 |
| 2 | Hassan Bayadi | 7 / 15 | 23.33 |
| 2 | Nader Shariatmadari | 5 / 15 | 16.66 |
| 2 | Mohammad Saeedikia | Withdrew | |
| 3, 4, 5 | Mohammad Bagher Ghalibaf | 7 / 15 | 46.66 |
| 3, 4, 5 | Amir Reza Khadem | 7 / 15 | 46.66 |
| 3, 4, 5 | Blank vote | 1 | 6.66 |
| 6 | Mohammad Bagher Ghalibaf | 7 / 15 | 46.66 |
| 6 | Amir Reza Khadem | 6 / 15 | 40 |
| 6 | Blank vote | 2 | 13.33 |
| 7 | Mohammad Bagher Ghalibaf | 8 / 15 | 53.33 |
| 7 | Amir Reza Khadem | 6 / 15 | 40 |
| 7 | Blank vote | 1 | 6.66 |

=== 2013 ===
After a tie with Reformist-backed Mohsen Hashemi in first round, Ghalibaf controversially won the election in second round's anonymous voting when Reform-affiliated member Elaheh Rastgou voted for him.

| Round | Candidate | Votes | % |
|---|---|---|---|
| 1 | Mohammad Bagher Ghalibaf | 15 / 31 | 48.38 |
| 1 | Mohsen Hashemi | 15 / 31 | 48.38 |
| 1 | Blank vote | 1 | 3.2 |
| 2 | Mohammad Bagher Ghalibaf | 16 / 31 | 51.61 |
| 2 | Mohsen Hashemi | 14 / 31 | 45.16 |
| 2 | Invalid vote | 1 | 3.2 |

== Presidential elections ==
=== 2005 ===
In the first round, Mohammad Bagher Ghalibaf finished fourth with 4,095,827 votes (13.93%) and did not advance to the second round.

=== 2013 ===
Mohammad Bagher Ghalibaf finished second with 6,077,292 votes (16.56%).
