= Electoral history of Mohsen Rezaee =

List of elections featuring Mohsen Rezaee as a candidate

This is a summary of the electoral history of Mohsen Rezaee, an Iranian Principlist politician who had been a member of Expediency Discernment Council since 1997, and was Chief Commander of Iranian Revolutionary Guard Corps from 1981 to 1997.

== Parliament election ==
=== 2000 ===
In 2000, Rezaee registered for Iranian Parliament election from Tehran. He was supperted by Islamic Coalition Party, Combatant Clergy Association and was listed in Coalition of Followers of the Line of the Imam and Leader electoral list. He lost the election. He received 539,796 out of 2,931,113 votes and was ranked 36th.

== Presidential elections ==
=== 2005 ===
He registered for the election, but withdrew on 15 June 2005 two days before the election.

=== 2009 ===
Rezaee finished third with 678,240 votes (1.73%).

=== 2013 ===
Rezaee finished fourth with 3,884,412 votes (10.58%).
