= 1992 Seychellois constitutional commission election =

Constitutional Commission elections were held in the Seychelles between 23 and 26 July 1992. They were the first multi-party elections since the 1977 coup had installed the Seychelles People's Progressive Front as the sole legal party. The commission was elected by proportional representation, with a threshold of 5% to win one of the 22 seats.

The SPPF emerged as the largest party with 14 of the representatives, whilst the remaining eight went to the Seychelles Democratic Party. Voter turnout was 85.3%.

== Results ==
Party	Votes	%	Seats
Seychelles People's Progressive Front	24,538	58.39	14
Seychelles Democratic Party	14,150	33.67	8
Seselwa Party	1,829	4.35	0
National Alliance Party	672	1.60	0
Seychelles Movement for Democracy	322	0.77	0
Seychelles National Party	259	0.62	0
Seychelles Liberal Party	201	0.48	0
Seychelles Christian Democrats	54	0.13	0
Total	42,025	100.00	22
Valid votes	42,025	98.54	
Invalid/blank votes	623	1.46	
Total votes	42,648	100.00	
Registered voters/turnout	49,975	85.34	
Source: Nohlen et al.
