= Philippe Boullé =

Seychellois lawyer and politician

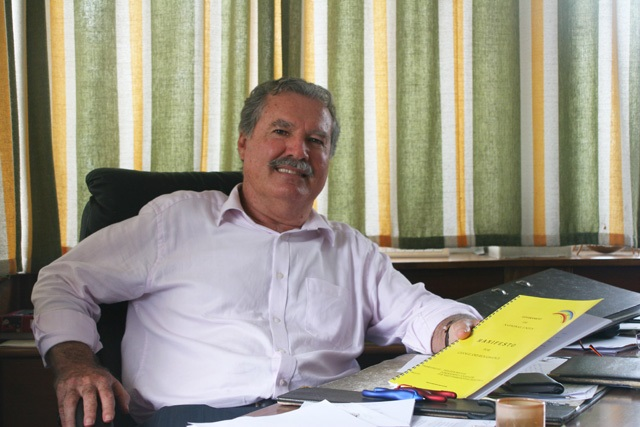
- Occupation(s): Politician, lawyer

Philippe Boullé is a Seychellois lawyer and politician. In the country's first multiparty presidential election, held in July 1993, he was the candidate of a three-party coalition known as the 'United Opposition'. He won 3.78% of the vote, finishing a distant third behind the incumbent President France-Albert René (59.50%) and James Mancham (36.72%).

Boullé ran again in the 31 August - 2 September 2001 presidential election, this time as an independent, and finished last out of three candidates, winning 0.86% of the vote.

He ran again as an independent candidate in the 28 - 30 July 2006 presidential election and received just 0.56% of the total vote behind winner James Michel and runner-up Wavel Ramkalawan.

He is also a prominent figure in the Seychelles offshore sector. He owns an offshore firm in the Seychelles, as well as in many other jurisdictions around the world.
