= 2006 Seychellois presidential election =

- 28–30 July 2006
- Registered: 64,026
- Turnout: 88.69%
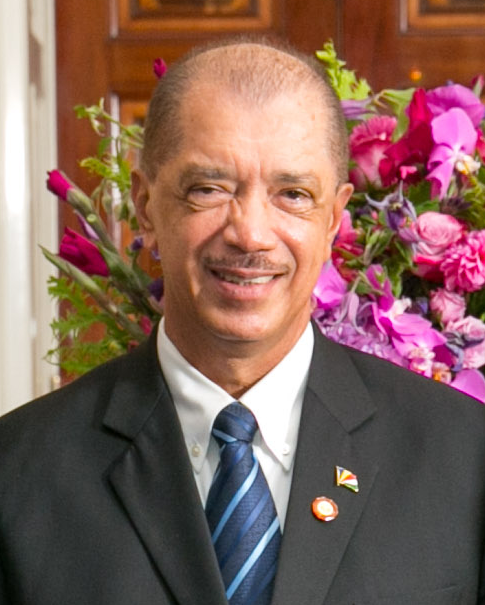

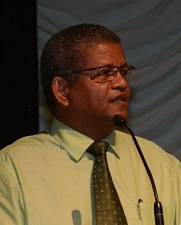
| Nominee | James Michel | Wavel Ramkalawan |
| Party | FPPS | SNP–SDP |
| Running mate | Joseph Belmont | Annette Georges |
| Popular vote | 30,119 | 25,626 |
| Percentage | 53.73% | 45.71% |
- Results by district
President before election
James Michel
FPPS
Elected President
James Michel
FPPS

Presidential elections were held in the Seychelles between 28 and 30 July 2006. Incumbent president James Michel of the Seychelles People's Progressive Front was re-elected with 54% of the vote.

== Candidates ==
Three candidates participated in the election.

- James Michel – Incumbent president and candidate of the ruling Seychelles People's Progressive Front (SPPF) party. He took over as president after long-time President France-Albert René, who won the last presidential election in 2001, stepped down in July 2004. His running mate was Joseph Belmont.
- Wavel Ramkalawan – Candidate of the main opposition Seychelles National Party (SNP). He finished second to René in the 1998 and 2001. He was also endorsed by the Democratic Party (DP), another opposition party. His running mate was Annette Georges.
- Philippe Boulle – An independent candidate who ran in the 1993 and 2001 presidential elections. His running mate was Henry Naiken.

== Results ==
| Candidate | Running mate | Party | Votes | % |
|---|---|---|---|---|
| James Michel | Joseph Belmont | Seychelles People's Progressive Front | 30,119 | 53.73 |
| Wavel Ramkalawan | Annette Georges | Seychelles National Party | 25,626 | 45.71 |
| Philippe Boullé | Henry Naiken | Independent | 314 | 0.56 |
| Total | | | 56,059 | 100.00 |
| Valid votes | | | 56,059 | 98.72 |
| Invalid/blank votes | | | 728 | 1.28 |
| Total votes | | | 56,787 | 100.00 |
| Registered voters/turnout | | | 64,026 | 88.69 |
Source: African Elections Database
