= Seychelles National Party =

Political party in Seychelles

- Abbreviation: SNP
- Leader: Wavel Ramkalawan
- Secretary-General: Nicholas Prea
- Founder: Gérard Hoarau
- Founded: 1994
- Dissolved: 21 September 2021
- Merged into: Linyon Demokratik Seselwa
- Headquarters: Victoria
- Newspaper: Regar
- Ideology: Liberalism
- Political position: Centre
- International affiliation: Africa Liberal Network
- Colours: Green

Website
- www.snpseychelles.sc

The Seychelles National Party (SNP) was a liberal political party in Seychelles. Its followers emphasized active multiparty democracy, respect for human rights and liberal economic reforms. It was founded in response to what it called the "totalitarian regime" of former President France-Albert René. It published a newsletter called Regar, which is frequently sued for libel by government officials. On Regar's front page of every issue is a quote from the constitution of Seychelles invoking their right to freedom of speech and freedom of expression.

The SNP was formed by the merger of three separate opposition parties in 1994: the Seychelles National Movement, led by Gérard Hoarau; the National Alliance Party, led by Philippe Boullé (an independent presidential candidate in the 2001 presidential election); and Parti Seselwa, led by Wavel Ramkalawan.

Ramkalawan, an Anglican priest, is the SNP's current leader. He won 44.9% of the vote in the 2001 presidential election, behind René (54.2%) and ahead of Boullé (0.9%). At parliamentary elections in December 2002, the SNP won 42.6% of the vote and 11 seats out of 34. Seven members were directly elected and four were chosen by proportional representation.

The July/August 2006 presidential elections gave James Michel of the SPPF 54% of the votes and Wavel Ramkalawan 46% of the votes. The last Presidential elections held in December 2015 saw SNP achieving only 35% of the popular votes in the first round. It joined with other smaller political parties under the banner of Union for Change to contest the second round of the Presidential Elections. The Union achieved 49.85% of the popular votes leaving the incumbent President James Michel to claim a slim victory.

The election of the National Assembly was held on the 22–24 October 2020. The Seychelles National Party, the Seychelles Party for Social Justice and Democracy and the Seychelles United Party formed a coalition, Linyon Demokratik Seselwa (LDS). LDS won 25 seats and US got 10 seats of the 35 seats of the National Assembly. In the simultaneous presidential election Wavel Ramkalawan won and he was the first president since 1977 who did not represent the long-term ruling party.

On 21 September 2021, the Electoral Commission cancelled the registration of the Seychelles National Party.

== Electoral history ==
=== Presidential elections ===
Election	Party candidate	Votes	%	Votes	%	Result
Election	Party candidate	First round		Second round		Result
1998	Wavel Ramkalawan	9,098	19.5%	-	-	Lost ✗
2001	Wavel Ramkalawan	22,581	44.9%	-	-	Lost ✗
2006	Wavel Ramkalawan	25,626	45.71%	-	-	Lost ✗
2011	Wavel Ramkalawan	23,878	41.43%	-	-	Lost ✗
2015	Wavel Ramkalawan	21,391	35.33%	31,319	49.85%	Lost ✗
2020	Wavel Ramkalawan	35,562	54.91%	-	-	Elected ✓

=== National Assembly elections ===
Election	Party leader	Votes	%	Seats	+/–	Position	Result
1992	Wavel Ramkalawan	259	0.6%	0 / 22	Steady	▲6th	Extra-parliamentary
1993	Wavel Ramkalawan	4,163 (as part of United Opposition)	9.7%	1 / 33	▲1	▲3rd	Opposition
1998	Wavel Ramkalawan	12,084 (as part of United Opposition)	26.1%	3 / 34	▲2	▲2nd	Opposition
2002	Wavel Ramkalawan	22,030	42.59%	11 / 34	▲8	2nd	Opposition
2007	Wavel Ramkalawan	23,869 in alliance with SDP	43.43%	11 / 34	Steady	2nd	Opposition
2011	Wavel Ramkalawan	Boycotted		0 / 31	▼11		Extra-parliamentary
2016	Wavel Ramkalawan	30,444 (as part of LDS)	49.59%	19 / 33	▲19	▲2nd	Opposition majority
2020	Wavel Ramkalawan	35,202 (as part of LDS)	54.84%	25 / 35	▲6	▲1st	LDS coalition government

== Notable people ==
- Norbert Loizeau
- Satya Naidu

== See also ==
- Liberalism
- Contributions to liberal theory
- Liberalism worldwide
- List of liberal parties
- Liberal democracy
