= 1998 Seychellois general election =

- 20–22 March 1998
- Registered: 54,847
- Presidential election
- Turnout: 86.70%
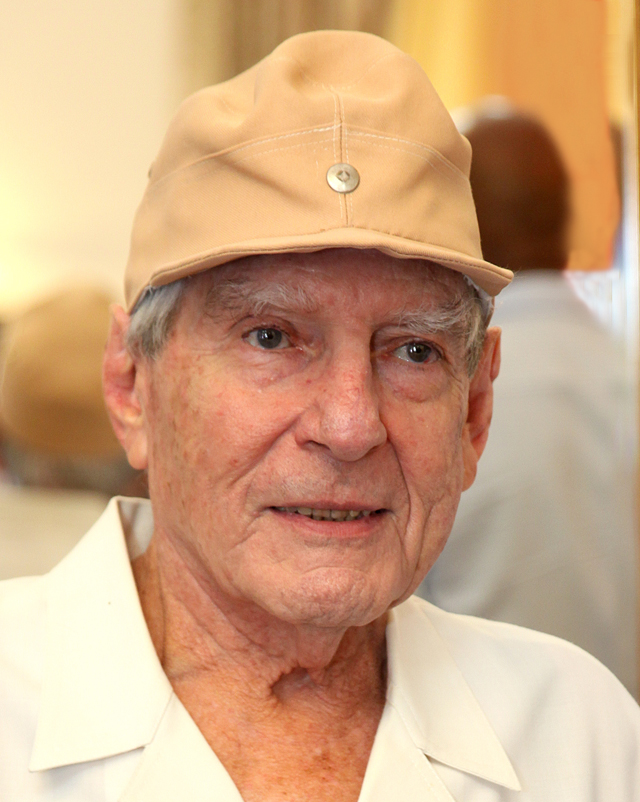

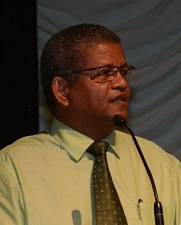

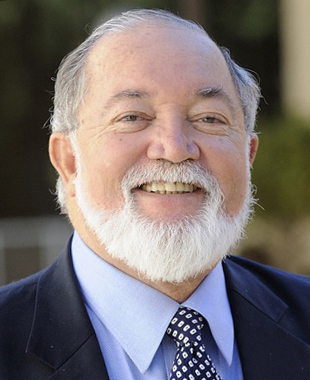
Nominee	France-Albert René	Wavel Ramkalawan	James Mancham
Party	FPPS	United Opposition	Democratic Party
Running mate	James Michel	Annette Georges	Danielle Belle
Popular vote	31,048	9,098	6,427
Percentage	66.67%	19.53%	13.80%
- Results by constituency.
President before election
France-Albert René
FPPS
Elected President
France-Albert René
FPPS
- Legislative election
- 20–22 March 1998
Party	Leader	Vote %	Seats	+/–
FPPS	France-Albert René	61.71	30	+3
UO	Wavel Ramkalawan	26.06	3	+2
SDP	James Mancham	12.10	1	−4
This lists parties that won seats. See the complete results below.
Results by constituency.

General elections were held in the Seychelles between 20 and 22 March 1998. Incumbent President France-Albert René and his Seychelles People's Progressive Front won both elections with over 60% of the vote, defeating a divided opposition.

== Campaign ==
On the 4 February 1998 it was announced that the presidential and parliamentary elections would be held at the same time in March. President René and his ruling Seychelles People's Progressive Front were expected to easily win the elections. René enjoyed strong support for introducing a social welfare system and benefited from the inability of the opposition to unite against him. He was challenged by the former President James Mancham of the Seychelles Democratic Party, who he had deposed in a coup in 1977, and also by Wavel Ramkalawan of the new United Opposition party.

The election saw a joint team of international election monitors from the Commonwealth of Nations and Francophonie observe the election, the first time they had sent a combined team to observe an election. The team was led by Sir John Compton, former Prime Minister of Saint Lucia. The monitors said the election was mainly free and fair, and complemented it on being well organised. However, there were some complaints about vote buying by government officials.

== Results ==
=== President ===
President René won the presidential election with two-thirds of the vote, while former President Mancham was beaten into third place by Wavel Ramkalawan.

Candidate	Running mate	Party	Votes	%
France-Albert René	James Michel	Seychelles People's Progressive Front	31,048	66.67
Wavel Ramkalawan	Annette Georges	United Opposition	9,098	19.53
James Mancham	Danielle Belle	Seychelles Democratic Party	6,427	13.80
Total			46,573	100.00
Valid votes			46,573	97.95
Invalid/blank votes			977	2.05
Total votes			47,550	100.00
Registered voters/turnout			54,847	86.70
Source: Nohlen et al.

=== Parliament ===
The parliamentary results saw the governing Seychelles People's Progressive Front win 24 of the 25 directly elected seats and a further 6 of the 9 seats that were elected proportionally. The opposition Democratic Party was reduced to only one seat, while the new United Opposition won three seats.

Party	Votes	%	Seats			
Party	Votes	%	FPTP	PR	Total	+/–
Seychelles People's Progressive Front	28,610	61.71	24	6	30	+3
United Opposition	12,084	26.06	0	3	3	+2
Seychelles Democratic Party	5,609	12.10	1	0	1	–4
Independents	60	0.13	0	0	0	New
Total	46,363	100.00	25	9	34	+1
Valid votes	46,363	97.47				
Invalid/blank votes	1,205	2.53				
Total votes	47,568	100.00				
Registered voters/turnout	54,847	86.73				
Source: Nohlen et al.
