= Seychelles Democratic Party =

Political party in Seychelles

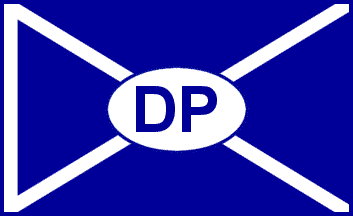
- Founded: 1964
- Ideology: Conservatism; Historical: British unionism (until independence)
- Political position: Right-wing

The Seychelles Democratic Party is a political party in Seychelles. It was founded by the late Sir James Mancham and David Joubert in July 1964, and governed the country from 1970 to 1977.

== History ==
After a time in exile in the United Kingdom, Mancham returned to the islands following the Seychelles' transition to democracy in 1993. He had led the SDP from the time of its founding. At the last elections of 6 December 2002 the party won 3.1% of the vote and failed to gain representation in the National Assembly. In February 2005 Mancham stepped down with Nichol Gabriel assuming the leadership of the party. In March 2006 Paul Chow was elected as party leader in a vote held by the executives of the party.

== Leadership ==
- James Mancham, 1964 - February 2005
- Nichol Gabriel, February 2005 - March 2006
- Paul Chow, March 2006 - 2008 -?

== Electoral history ==
=== Presidential elections ===
Election	Party candidate	Votes	%	Votes	%	Result
Election	Party candidate	First round		Second round		Result
1993	James Mancham	15,815	36.7%	-	-	Lost ✗
1998	James Mancham	6,427	13.8%	-	-	Lost ✗
2006	Supported Wavel Ramkalawan (SNP)	25,626	45.71%	-	-	Lost ✗

=== National Assembly elections ===
Election	Party leader	Votes	%	Seats	+/–	Position	Result
1967	James Mancham	8,760	48.2%	4 / 8	▲4	▲1st	Majority government
1970	James Mancham	18,972	52.8%	10 / 15	▲6	1st	Supermajority government
1974	James Mancham	21,902	52.37%	13 / 15	▲3	1st	Supermajority government
1979	Banned; One-party state rule from 1978 to 1991						
1983	Banned; One-party state rule from 1978 to 1991						
1987	Banned; One-party state rule from 1978 to 1991						
1992	James Mancham	14,150	33.7%	8 / 22	▲8	▲2nd	Opposition
1993	James Mancham	14,062	32.3%	5 / 33	▼3	2nd	Opposition
1998	James Mancham	5,609	12.1%	1 / 34	▼4	▼3rd	Opposition
2002	James Mancham	1,605	3.10%	0 / 34	▼1	3rd	Extra-parliamentary
2007	Paul Chow	23,869 in alliance with SNP	43.43%	11 / 34	▲11	▲2nd	Opposition
2011	?	Boycotted		0 / 31	▼11		Extra-parliamentary
