= Elections in Seychelles =

Seychelles elects on national level a head of state—the president—and a legislature. The president is elected for a five-year term by the people. The National Assembly/Assemblée Nationale has 34 members elected for terms of five years, 25 members elected in single-seat constituencies and 9 members elected by proportional representation. Seychelles has a two-party system, which means that there are two dominant political parties, with extreme difficulty for anyone to achieve electoral success under the banner of any other party.

== Latest election ==
=== President ===
Candidate	Running mate	Party	Votes	%
Wavel Ramkalawan	Ahmed Afif	Linyon Demokratik Seselwa	35,562	54.91
Danny Faure	Maurice Loustau-Lalanne	United Seychelles	28,178	43.51
Alain St Ange	Peter Sinon	One Seychelles	1,021	1.58
Total			64,761	100.00
Valid votes			64,761	98.10
Invalid/blank votes			1,256	1.90
Total votes			66,017	100.00
Registered voters/turnout			74,634	88.45
Source: ECS

=== National Assembly ===
Party	Votes	%	Seats			
Party	Votes	%	FPTP	PR	Total	+/−
Linyon Demokratik Seselwa	35,202	54.84	20	5	25	+6
United Seychelles	27,185	42.35	6	4	10	−4
One Seychelles	1,420	2.21	0	0	0	New
Seychellois Alliance	70	0.11	0	0	0	New
Independents	317	0.49	0	0	0	0
Total	64,194	100.00	26	9	35	+2
Valid votes	64,194	97.30				
Invalid/blank votes	1,784	2.70				
Total votes	65,978	100.00				
Registered voters/turnout	74,634	88.40				
Source: ECS

==== By constituency ====
Constituency		LDS		US		OS		Others		Valid	Total	Turnout	Registered
Constituency		Votes	%	Votes	%	Votes	%	Votes	%	Valid	Total	Turnout	Registered
1	Anse Aux Pins	1496	52.8	1254	44.2	84	3.0			2834	2916	88	3304
2	Anse Boileau	1564	53.1	1340	45.5	41	1.4			2945	3012	89	3398
3	Anse Etoile	2161	62.0	1273	36.5	50	1.4			3484	3585	88	4064
4	Anse Royale	1343	46.4	1484	51.3	66	2.3			2893	2893	86	3375
5	Au Cap	1845	61.7	1081	36.2	41	1.4	23	0.8	2990	3071	88	3509
6	Baie Lazare	1324	55.0	1083	45.0					2407	2481	90	2756
7	Baie Ste Anne	1289	43.5	1383	46.7	292	9.9			2964	3051	89	3444
8	Beau Vallon	1727	60.0	913	31.7			239	8.3	2879	2963	87	3421
9	Bel Air	1025	51.7	870	43.9	87	4.4			1982	2028	88	2315
10	Belombre	1726	63.2	1005	36.8					2731	2822	87	3261
11	Cascade	1317	54.2	1084	44.6	27	1.1			2428	2495	90	2785
12	English River	1429	57.5	980	39.5	50	2.0	25	1.0	2484	2575	89	2908
13	Glacis	1713	62.2	985	35.8	55	2.0			2753	2826	86	3270
14	Grand Anse (Mahe)	1428	67.6	685	32.4					2113	2183	88	2478
15	Grand Anse (Praslin)	1296	51.8	1103	44.0	105	4.2			2504	2521	90	2810
16	Ile Perseverance	1438	53.2	1098	40.6	167	6.2			2703	2826	92	3083
17	Inner Islands	665	37.1	1105	61.7	22	1.2			1792	1838	90	2046
18	Les Mamelles	1177	58.1	827	40.8			22	1.1	2026	2084	90	2326
19	Mont Buxton	1449	58.5	993	40.1	35	1.4			2477	2552	89	2882
20	Mont Fleuri	1317	58.9	919	41.1		0.0			2236	2305	87	2643
21	Plaisance	1452	53.2	1221	44.8	55	2.0			2728	2845	87	3257
22	Pointe Larue	966	46.2	1096	52.4	28	1.3			2090	2142	89	2400
23	Port Glaud	870	48.4	929	51.6					1799	1856	92	2008
24	Roche Caiman	776	44.4	781	44.7	192	11.0			1749	1803	91	1990
25	Saint Louis	1281	59.9	781	36.5			78	3.6	2140	2187	85	2572
26	Takamaka	1128	54.7	912	44.2	23	1.1			2063	2118	91	2329
Total		35202	54.8	27185	42.3	1420	2.2	387	0.6	64194	65978	88	74634
Source: ECS

== List of Seychellois parliamentary elections ==
- 1948 Seychellois parliamentary election
- 1951 Seychellois parliamentary election
- 1953 Seychellois parliamentary election
- 1957 Seychellois parliamentary election
- 1963 Seychellois parliamentary election
- 1967 Seychellois parliamentary election
- 1970 Seychellois parliamentary election
- 1974 Seychellois parliamentary election
- 1979 Seychellois general election
- 1983 Seychellois parliamentary election
- 1987 Seychellois parliamentary election
- 1992 Seychellois constitutional commission election
- 1993 Seychellois general election
- 1998 Seychellois general election
- 2002 Seychellois parliamentary election
- 2007 Seychellois parliamentary election
- 2011 Seychellois parliamentary election
- 2016 Seychellois parliamentary election
- 2025 Seychellois general election

== See also ==
- Electoral calendar
- Electoral system
