= One-party rule in Seychelles =

Seychelles' government system from 1977–1991

Republic of Seychelles: République des Seychelles (French); Repiblik Sesel (Seychellois Creole)
- 1977–1991
- Flag Coat of arms
- Motto: "Finis Coronat Opus (The End Crowns the Work)"
- Anthem: En Avant (1977–1978); Fyer Seselwa (1978–1991)
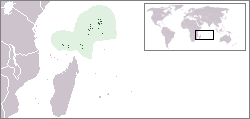
- Capital: Victoria
- Official languages: English, French, Seychellois Creole
- Government: Unitary presidential republic (1977–1979) Unitary socialist republic (1979–1991)
- President
  - 1977–1991: France-Albert René
- Legislature: People's Assembly
- Historical era: Cold War
  - 1977 coup d'état: 5 June 1977
  - 1981 coup attempt: 25 November 1981
  - Return to multi-party democracy: 27 December 1991

Area
  - Total: 459 km^{2} (177 sq mi)
- Currency: Roupie (SCR)
- Calling code: +248
- ISO 3166 code: SC
| Preceded by | Succeeded by |
| Republic of Seychelles (1976–1977) | Third Republic of Seychelles |

From 1977 to 1991, Seychelles was ruled by France-Albert René and the Seychelles People's Progressive Front as a one-party state.

== History ==
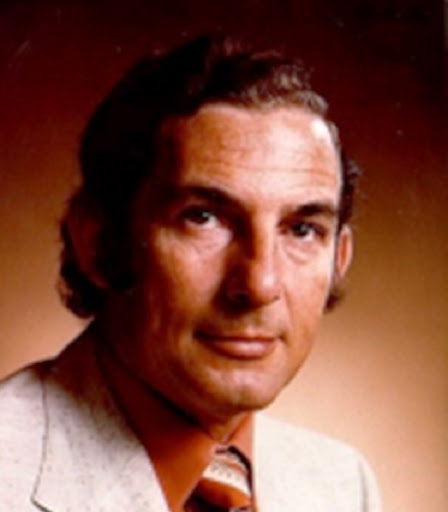
France-Albert René, Seychelles president (1977–2004)

In 1977 France-Albert René's SPUP led a coup against the SDP–led Government, and in 1979, new elections were also called in and Rene was formally elected President of Seychelles. The newly reformed system of one-party socialism featured a directly elected president, as well as the original plurality system of legislative representation. All political activity took place under the rule of the Seychelles People's Progressive Front, and the President was voted for on a yes-no basis by any Seychelles citizen 17 or older. The president enjoyed almost unchecked executive power, and appointed his own cabinet as well as his own chair of the Assembly. The legislature itself was unable to rule independently, and instead only enacted the bills proposed by the executive. Criticism of René or any aspect of his government was not tolerated.

On the other hand, the SPPF instituted a number of reforms, including universal access to education and healthcare, as well as environmental reforms. During this period, the Seychelles developed rapidly, to the point that it became the most developed country in Africa on the Human Development Index. The situation for Seychellois Creole people, who constitute the majority of the nation's population, also improved significantly due to domestic policies implemented by President René aimed at racial equity. However, the white minority (mainly Franco-Seychellois) still occupied most important posts (ministerial and parliamentary) in the state administration and dominated the ranks of the party leadership.

Since his regime operated under single-party status, René was the only presidential candidate for elections in 1979, in 1984, and in 1989, which he won with over 90% of the vote. René maintained this level of influence and power through systematic torture and widespread human rights violations, as well as state violence against his political enemies throughout his presidency. He admitted to spying on oppositional leaders, and is thought to have been involved in the murder of Gerard Hoareau. His party also maintained control through the National Youth Service, which assisted in indoctrinating and training Seychellois children in traditional curricula and military affairs. René employed a combination of Soviet, American, and Tanzanian influence and support to assist him in maintaining power and defending himself against coup attempts, of which there were plenty.

== Coup attempts ==
On 25 November 1981 a force of mercenaries, led by "Mad" Mike Hoare, attempted to take over the islands, but were discovered at the airport. They briefly took over the tower, but hijacked an Air India flight and fled to South Africa where they were arrested and charged.

In August 1982, mutineers in the Seychelles Army, maintaining loyalty to Rene but in revolt against alleged conditions in the service, took over the radio station. They were overcome by Tanzanian troops, whose intervention was requested by Rene.

In November 1985, Gérard Hoarau, a prominent exiled opponent of Rene was shot and killed by an unidentified gunman on the doorstep of his London home. Hoareau's supporters claimed the Seychelles Government was responsible for the shooting but this was denied and the murder case was never solved.

Despite these attempts, for the most part René ruled throughout this period with underground opposition at home. He used Seychelles' strategic importance to obtain significant help from both superpowers of the period without having to commit himself to either. With a suppressed opposition, he was able to power through much needed social reforms.

In February 1992, Conrad Greslé, a prominent local businessman and democracy activist was arrested and charged with treason for planning to overthrow the Seychelles Government with the help of foreign mercenaries and with alleged CIA involvement. This was the last attempt to overthrow the Seychelles Government by force.

== See also ==
- Politics of Seychelles
