= United Seychelles Women's League =

- Formation: August 23, 1970 (as Seychelles People's United Party Women's League) March 5, 2010 (as Parti Lepep Women's League) 2018 (as United Seychelles Women's League)
- Type: Women's wing

The United Seychelles Women's League is the women's wing of the United Seychelles Party. The organization was established on 23 August 1970 as the Seychelles People's United Party Women’s League and later changed its name to Seychelles People's Progressive Front Women’s League following its parent party. After Seychelles People's Progressive Front changed its name to Parti Lepep in June 2009, the organisation was re-launched as the Parti Lepep Women’s League on 5 March 2010.

== History ==
=== Seychelles People's United Party Women’s League ===
The league was established on 23 August 1970 as the Seychelles People's United Party Women’s League (SPUP League) by party chairman and the-then President of Seychelles France-Albert René. The existence of the organization had been planned as early as 1968. Sylvette Frichot, the SPUP's principal coordinator and one of the league's co-founder, was elected as the chairwoman of the league upon its inception. The league had around 800 members at the time of its establishment.

As part of its program, the league held adult illiteracy and cooking classes for women. The league was also involved in mobilizing women for strikes and protest marches against the Seychelles Democratic Party government of James Mancham and demanded full independence of Seychelles from the United Kingdom.

=== Seychelles People's Progressive Front Women’s League ===
After SPUP seized power in 1977, the party changed its name to Seychelles People's Progressive Front. The league followed suit and later changed its name to Seychelles People's Progressive Front Women’s League. Frichot was appointed to the new, SPUP-led government as the Secretary of the Ministry of Political Organisation. Rita Sinon, the league's secretary, replaced her as the chairwoman. The league was merged along with other women organizations to form the Seychelles Woman Association on 8 March 1978.

In 1984, the league enacted its first constitution. The constitution established its objectives, which were as follows:

- Promote their political, education, social and economic standard
- Act as a control body for coordinated representations to the Central Committee of the SPPF on matters concerning women
- Preserve the rights and liberties of women and combat discrimination against them
- Implement any directives issues by the SPPF; and
- Raise fund, manage and invest the fund of the League

Sinon later became Seychelles first female minister when she was appointed as the Minister of Internal Affairs on 19 September 1986. She died on 8 May 1989. Frichot, the previous chairwoman, was re-appointed to replace Sinon in 1991.

The SPPF Women's league regularly celebrated the International Women's Day to commemorate important events. The league's constitution was officially amended on the 1995 International Women's Day.

=== Parti Lepep Women’s League ===
On 5 March 2010, the league was relaunched as the Parti Lepep Women’s League. Member of the National Assembly for Baie Ste Anne, Praslin, Mitcy Larue, became the league's new chairwoman.

== Organization ==
During its existence as the SPUP and the SPPF Women's League, the league is led by a chairwoman, who is a member of the party's central committee. The league's executive committee consists of representative from each district of Seychelles. After the organization was re-launched as Parti Lepep Women’s League, the executive committee membership was expanded to included five young woman members chosen by the party.
