= Fyer Seselwa =

National anthem of Seychelles from 1978 to 1996

English: "Be Proud Seychellois"
- Former national anthem of Seychelles
- Lyrics: collectively
- Music: Pierre Dastros-Géze, 1978
- Adopted: 1978
- Relinquished: 1996
- Preceded by: "En Avant"
- Succeeded by: "Koste Seselwa"

Audio sample
- Fyer Seselwa: file; help

"Fyer Seselwa" ("Be Proud, Seychellois") was the national anthem of Seychelles from 1978 to 1996 after France-Albert René's coup, replacing "En Avant" as the national anthem. The lyrics were made collectively while the melody was made by Pierre Dastros-Géze.

== Lyrics ==
Seychellois Creole

Avek kouraz e disiplin nou ti briz tou baryer
Gouvernay dan nou lanmen nou pou reste touzou frer
Zanmen, zanmen, nou pou aret lite;
Plito lanmor ki viv dan lesklavaz.
Zanmen, zanmen, nou pou aret lite;
Legalite pour nou tou La Iiberte pour touzour.

Refren:
Debout, Zome Lib!
Fyer Seselwa,
Nou laport i'n ouver.
Nou semen i'n trase,
Nou soley i'n leve,
Nou pa pou tourn deryer.
Debout, Zome Lib!
Debout, Seselwa!
Annou reste dan linite, dan la liberte!

Avek dinyte nou later nou bezwen kiltive,
Avek deteminasyon lanmer nou pou eksplwate.
Annou touzour mars nou tou ansamn,
Pou rekolte tou sa ki nou'n senmen.
Annou touzour mars nou tou ansamn,
Fraternite dan leker nou lavnir devan nou.

Refren

French

Avec courage et discipline nous briserons toutes les barrières.
La barre en mains, nous resterons toujours frères.
Jamais, jamais nous ne cesserons de lutter.
Plutôt mourir que vivre en esclavage !
Jamais, jamais nous ne cesserons de lutter.
Egalité pour tous ! Liberté pour toujours !

Refrain :
Debout, hommes libres !
Fiers Seychellois,
Notre porte est ouverte.
Notre chemin est tracé,
Notre soleil est levé
Ne nous retournons pas.
Debout, hommes libres !
Fiers Seychellois,
Restons unis et libres !

Avec dignité nous cultivons notre terre,
Avec détermination nous exploitons la mer.
Nous marchons tous ensemble,
Pour récolter tout ce que nous avons semé.
Nous marchons tous ensemble,
La fraternité dans le coeur, l'avenir est à nous.

Refrain

English translation

With courage and discipline, we've broken every barrier
With the tiller in our hands, our brothership shall remain.
Never, never shall we cease to struggle;
It's better dead to be in slavery.
Never, never shall we cease to struggle;
Equality for all of us! Freedom forevermore!

Refrain:
Stand up, free men!
Proud Seychellois,
Our doors are open.
Our path has been traced,
Our sun has risen,
Never shall we turn back
Rise, free men!
Rise, Seychellois
Let us remain in unity and liberty!

With our dignity we've cultivated our land.
With our determination, we've exploited our seas.
March on, through the centuries;
The crops we planted we will have sown.
March on, through the centuries;
In our hearts our brotherhood shall remain, the future shall be ours!

Refrain
