= Tamil Seychellois =

Tamil-Seychellois
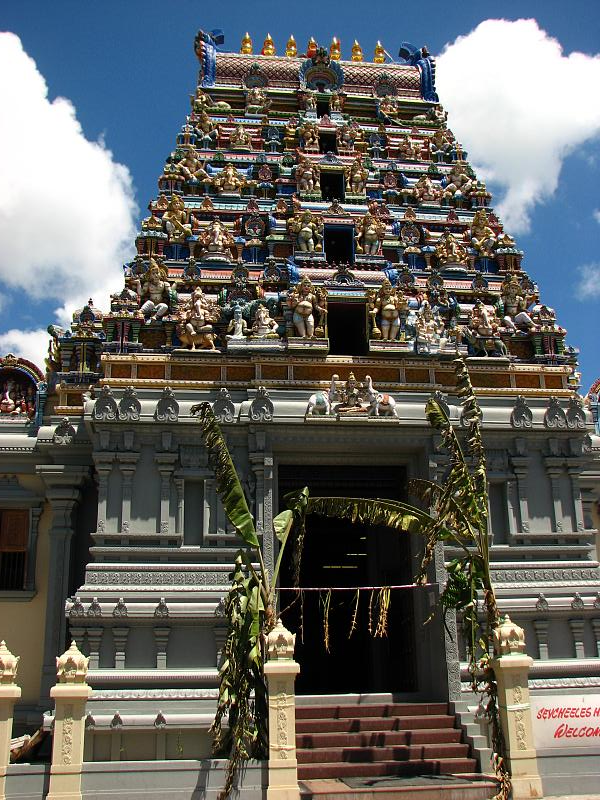
- A Tamil Hindu temple in Victoria, the capital city of Seychelles

Total population
- c. 4,000

Regions with significant populations
- Mahé, Seychelles

Religion
- Hinduism

Related ethnic groups
- Tamil people, Telugu people, Tamil Mauritians, Malbars, Tamil diaspora, Indian diaspora

Tamil-Seychellois are people of Southern Indian origins, predominantly from a Tamil background, living in the island nation of Seychelles. Their population is approximately 4,000, making them one of the country's significant minorities.

== History ==
Tamil immigrants arrived in Seychelles as early as 1770, and were among the first settlers to the originally sparsely inhabited island nation. Traders from the French colony of Pondicherry and later traders from present day Tamil Nadu visited the islands for trade in timber. A trading community was established and many of the Tamils integrated into the local population.

In 1901, there were roughly 3500 Tamil-speakers out of the country's population of 19,237.

== Language, religion and culture ==
The Tamils constitutes the majority of the Indo-Seychellois, who form 6% of the total population. Overall, it is believed that over 10% of the population of Seychelles has some Indian roots. They are primarily of South Indian Tamil origin, but a section of them have also Telugu roots, inherited from the several ancient communities of Telugus settled in current-day Tamil Nadu.

Hinduism continues to thrive as an important religion among the Tamil-Seychellois; according to the 2001 census there were 1600 Hindus in the country.

The Seychelles Hindu Kovil Sangam was founded in 1984. The annual Kavadi festival is a major event and a government holiday for all Hindus. Cultural troupes are invited from time to time to enhance cultural values and links. The organization of the Seychelles Hindu Council, national celebration of the Deepavali festival and the setting up of a crematorium with government support are events worthy of note. There is also a Hindu Council of Seychelles established and maintained by the community.

The Arulmigu Navasakti Vinayagar Temple in Victoria, the first and only Hindu temple in Seychelles, has Lord Ganesha as the presiding deity. In addition, icons of Murugan, Nadarajah, Durga, Sreenivasa Perumal, Bairava and Chandekeswarar are enshrined in the inner mandapam of the temple. Prayers are performed for the different deities on special occasions.

Seychelles Tamil Mandram was registered in 2002. Since then it has grown through the support of the Tamil community and dedicated committee members. The association promotes interactions of the Tamil community, Tamil language and literature and cultural and social functions. Two programmes are organized annually by Tamil Mandram. The Pongal festival in January brings scholars from Tamil Nadu for speeches and exhibits and local international cultural performances. Aadi thiruvizha is celebrated in September to commemorate the month of Aadi, which is important for agriculture. Drawing, essay and oratorical competitions and traditional games are conducted. Tamil Mandram organises Tamil classes. Active participation in Tamil classes, debates, dramas and other cultural events including Tamil publications has increased over the years.

== See also ==
- Malbars
- Tamil Mauritian
- Satya Naidu- first Hindu member of Seychelles National Assembly.
