= Seychelles National Movement =

Political movement during the 1980s

The Seychelles National Movement was a political movement created by the exiled Seychellois leader Gérard Hoarau who was based in London in the 1980s.

The movement was the follow-up to the MPR or Mouvement Pour La Resistance which was an underground movement again created by Gérard Hoarau when he was still living in the Seychelles. The MPR was a direct response by the resistance to the newly installed one party government of France-Albert René who seized power on 5 June 1977.
