= Jacques Hodoul =

Seychellois politician and judge (1943–2021)

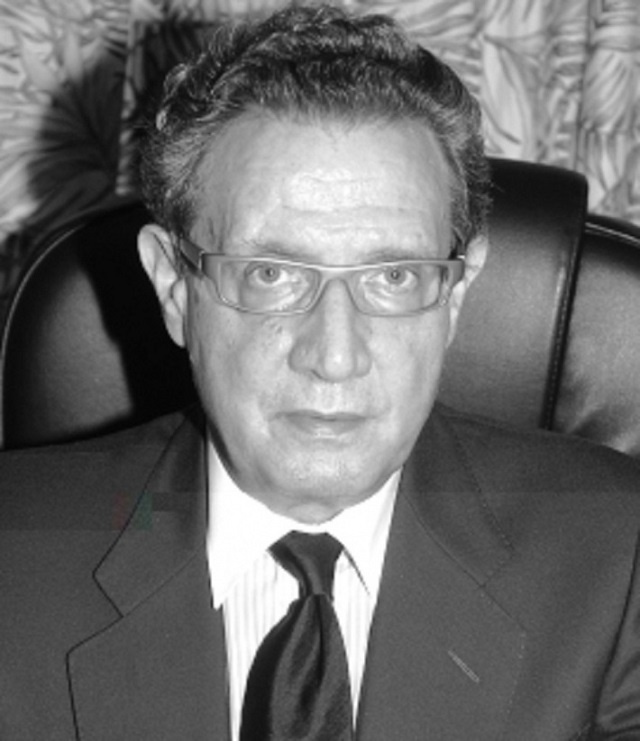

Minister of Tourism and Transport
- In office 1989–1991

Minister of National Development
- In office 1982–1989

Minister of Foreign Affairs
- In office 28 July 1979 – November 1982
- Preceded by: Guy Sinon
- Succeeded by: Maxime Ferrari

Personal details
- Born: September 1, 1943
- Died: May 3, 2021 (aged 77) Bel Ombre, Seychelles
- Party: Seychelles People's United Party
- Occupation: Politician

Jacques Hodoul (1 September 1943 – 3 May 2021) was a Seychellois judge and former politician. After serving as Minister of Education and Culture, he was Minister of Foreign Affairs from 1979 to 1982, Minister of National Development from 1982 to 1989, and Minister of Tourism and Transport from 1989 to 1991. He was the leader of the Seychelles Movement for Democracy, which he founded in 1991. Hodoul was appointed to the post of Justice of Appeal in March 2005, the highest court in Seychelles. Hodoul resigned from this position in 2011 after finishing his minimum five-year term. Hodoul died on 3 May 2021.

== Early life and career ==
Hodoul was born on September 1, 1943, in Mahe from a family of French landowners. Hodoul's ancestry could be traced back to "a famous pirate and slave trader of the nineteenth century".

During his early years, Hodoul briefly became a priest as well as a teacher with Canadian credentials. Around 1968, Hodoul taught at the Seychelles College and met with Francis MacGregor, who later become the President of the Court of Appeal. He then studied at The Inns of Court School of Law at Middle Temple London in 1970. He was called to the bar in 1973 and went into private practice as a lawyer in Seychelles.

== Political career ==
Hodoul began his involvement his politics since he joined the Seychelles People's United Party (SPUP) in 1976. Hodoul became the member of a constitutional commission around July 1976.

Following a brief rule by the pro-Western James Mancham, Hodoul's SPUP colleague and Mancham's prime minister France-Albert René took over the government in a coup d'état in 1977. Hodoul was appointed by Rene as education minister in that year. Hodoul designed several project that aimed to implement Marxist ideas into the general Seychelles population. These projects include the broadcast of lectures from the Seychelles Radio for use in classrooms and the establishment of the National Youth Service.

Hodoul was reshuffled to the post of foreign minister on 28 July 1979. As a Marxist hardliner, Hodoul implemented leftist foreign policies and aligned Seychelles with Warsaw Pact countries and North Korea. Several months after the 1981 Seychelles coup d'état attempt, in November 1982, Rene shifted into a more neutral diplomacy by replacing Hodoul with the more pragmatic Maxime Ferrari.

After ending his term as foreign minister, Hodoul served several different portfolios in the Seychellois cabinet, namely as the Minister of National Development from 1982 to 1989 and Minister of Tourism and Transport from 1989 to 1991. His resignation as Minister of Tourism and Transport coincided with the fall of the one-party system established by Rene in the Seychelles. He then established the Seychellois Movement for Democracy in late 1991. Hodoul participated in the constitutional election held a year later, which he lost, and continued working as an attorney. Hodoul returned to the Seychellois government as a judge in the Court of Appeal in March 2005 and resigned in August 2011.

Hodoul died on 3 May 2021 at his residence in the northern district of Bel Ombre. He is survived by his wife Mahrook and his son Jean-Jacques.
