= People's Assembly =

People's Assembly may refer to:

== Parliaments and legislatures ==
- People's Assembly (Albania), former name of the parliament of the Republic of Albania
- People's Assembly (Burma), the former unicameral legislature of socialist-era Burma
- Egypt's House of Representatives was known as the People's Assembly when it was part of the country's former bicameral parliament
- People's Assembly of Abkhazia, the legislature of Abkhazia
- People's National Assembly, the lower house of the Algerian Parliament
- Supreme People's Assembly, parliament of the Democratic People's Republic of Korea (North Korea)
- Assembly of the People (comitia populi tributa), a legislative assembly of the ancient Roman Republic
- People's Assembly of Seychelles, the legislature of Seychelles between 1979 and 1993
- People's Assembly of Syria, the unicameral legislature of Syria

== Other organizations ==
- People's Assembly (Uruguay), a socialist electoral coalition in Uruguay
- Peoples assemblies, gatherings called to address issues by direct democracy
- People's Assembly Against Austerity, a political initiative in the United Kingdom
- United Nations People's Assembly, a proposed addition to the United Nations System

== See also ==
- Roman assemblies, legislative institutions in ancient Rome
- Citizens' assembly, a body formed from the citizens of a modern state to deliberate on an issue
- National People's Assembly (disambiguation)
- Popular assembly (disambiguation)
