= Sylvette Frichot =

Personal details
- Occupation: Politician, teacher

Sylvette Frichot, sometimes Sylvette Frichot-Pool or Sylvette Pool (born 1945) is a former politician in the Seychelles.

Frichot trained in her youth as a teacher, but soon found that she was paid much less than men. The National Committee on Pay Equity defended this idea by referencing that women made 59 cents to every dollar that men made in 1963.

In 1966 she joined the Seychelles People's United Party led by Albert Réné, now known as the Seychelles People's Progressive Front, where she began doing clerical work. Due to her active party clerical work, she was later appointed as the Principal Coordinator of the Party. In 1968, Frichot found the party's Women's League, of which she was elected chair from 1970 to 1977. It is clear that Frichot found herself in leadership positions among women more times than not. She has also held a number of leadership positions in the wider party.

In 1989 she became the Minister of Information, Culture, and Sports; her agency was later renamed the Ministry of Local Government, Youth, and Sports. She has represented her country at numerous international youth and sports conferences. Frichot is known as a confidant of France-Albert René, with whom she and Rita Sinon worked closely during the early years of the republic.
