= Nibourette =

Nibourette is a surname. Notable people with the surname include:

- Alex Nibourette (born 1983), Seychellois footballer
- Roy Nibourette, Seychellois politician
