= Ginette Gamatis =

- Born: 26 December 1944 (age 81)
- Occupation: Politician
- Title: member of the National Assembly of Seychelles
- Spouse(s): Philippe Gamatis (died c. 2007)

Ginette Gamatis (née Bibi, born 1944) is a Seychellois teacher and politician. From 1983 to its dissolution in 1993, she was a member of the People's Assembly of Seychelles. From 1993 to 2011, she was member of the National Assembly of Seychelles as a representative of Port Glaud. She is a member of the Seychelles People's Progressive Front, and former member of Seychelles People's United Party.

Gamatis was born on 26 December 1944. She is from Port Glaud. She became a supply teacher when she was sixteen. She took a two-course teacher training course and eventually became headmistress of her school. Gamatis left teaching and was elected to the People's Assembly of Seychelles in 1983. In 1993, she joined the Seychelles People's Progressive Front and was elected to represent Port Glaud in the National Assembly. She retired from politics in 2011.

She and her husband, Philippe Gamatis (died c. 2007), had ten children. One of their sons died in the early 2000s, at the age of 32. One of her younger brothers, Jordan Bibi (1946/1947-2020), worked as a personal assistant and translator for Bruce Greatbatch.
