= Seychelles coup d'état =

Seychelles coup d'état may refer to:

- 1977 Seychelles coup d'état
- 1981 Seychelles coup d'état attempt
