= Indo-Seychellois =

Inhabitants of Seychellois of Indian heritage

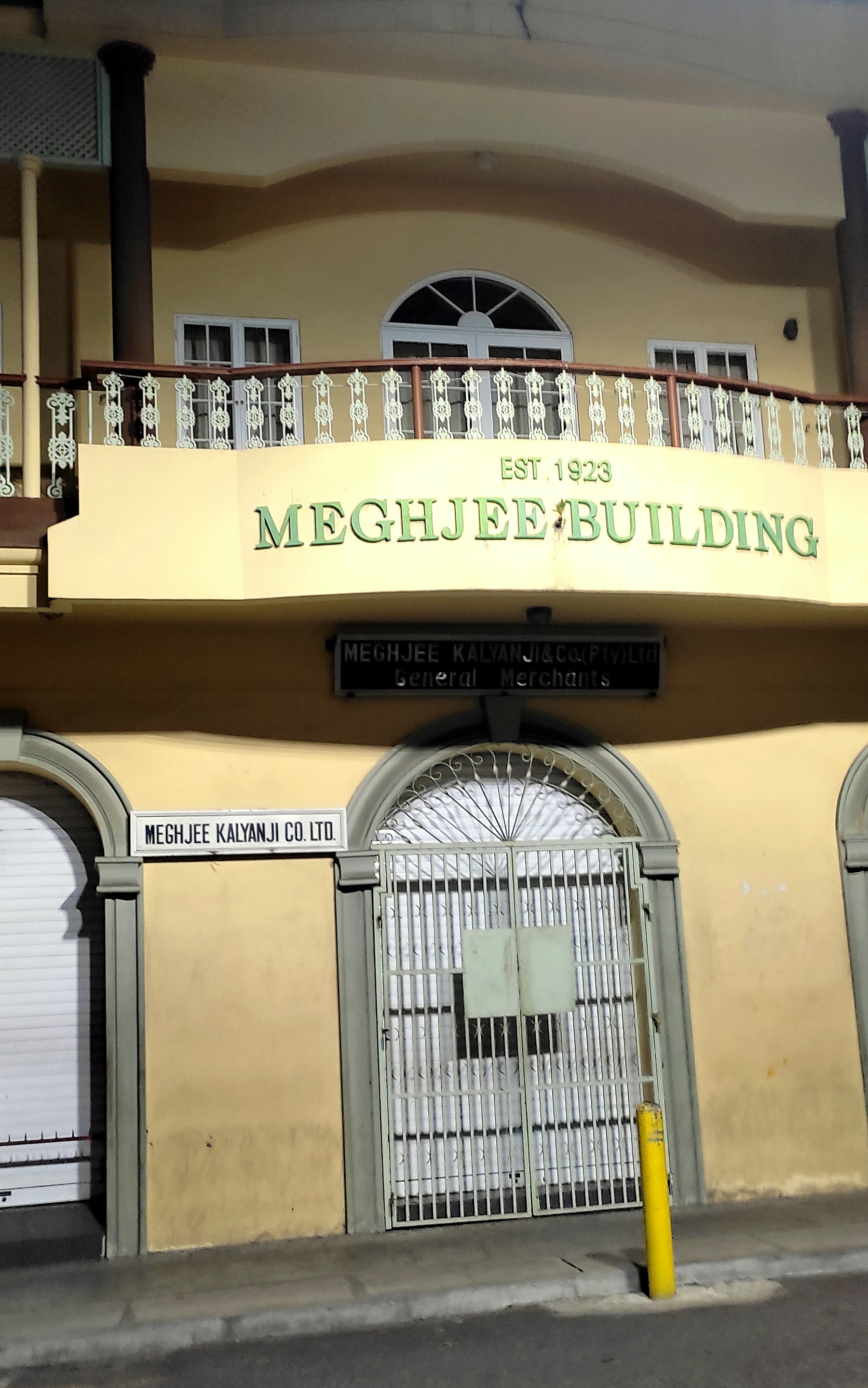
- Meghjee Building in Mahé, constructed by a local Indian Gujarati merchant's family in 1923

Total population
- 10,000

Regions with significant populations
- Mahé (mainly Victoria).

Languages
- Bihari languages, English, Hindi-Urdu, French, Tamil, Bengali, Telugu, Gujarati, Kannada, Kutchi, Odia, Seychellois Creole

Religion
- Hinduism, Islam, Christianity, Jainism, Others

Indo-Seychellois are inhabitants of Seychelles with Indian heritage. With about 10,000 Indo-Seychellois in a total Seychellois population of nearly 100,000, they constitute a minority ethnic group in Seychelles. According to National Bureau of Statistics Seychelles in 2022, Indian community in Seychelles representing 9.0% from Seychelles population, up from 4.4% in 2010.

== Origins ==
The first Indo-Seychellois were south Indians, who were brought as slaves along with Africans, by the fifteen French colonists in 1770. Later, as colonial plantations and road construction work started, a larger group was brought in not as slaves, but as indentured labourers (called coolies).

The colonial era arrival records of Indo-Seychellois were not well kept. Those available suggest ships brought Indians to work, and many returned to India when their work contract expired. For example, in February 1905, one British Indian ship's record states that 135 Indians arrived in the Seychelles mostly male adults (106), some females (42), and a few children (7). Those who stayed integrated within the Seychelles society.

== Demography ==
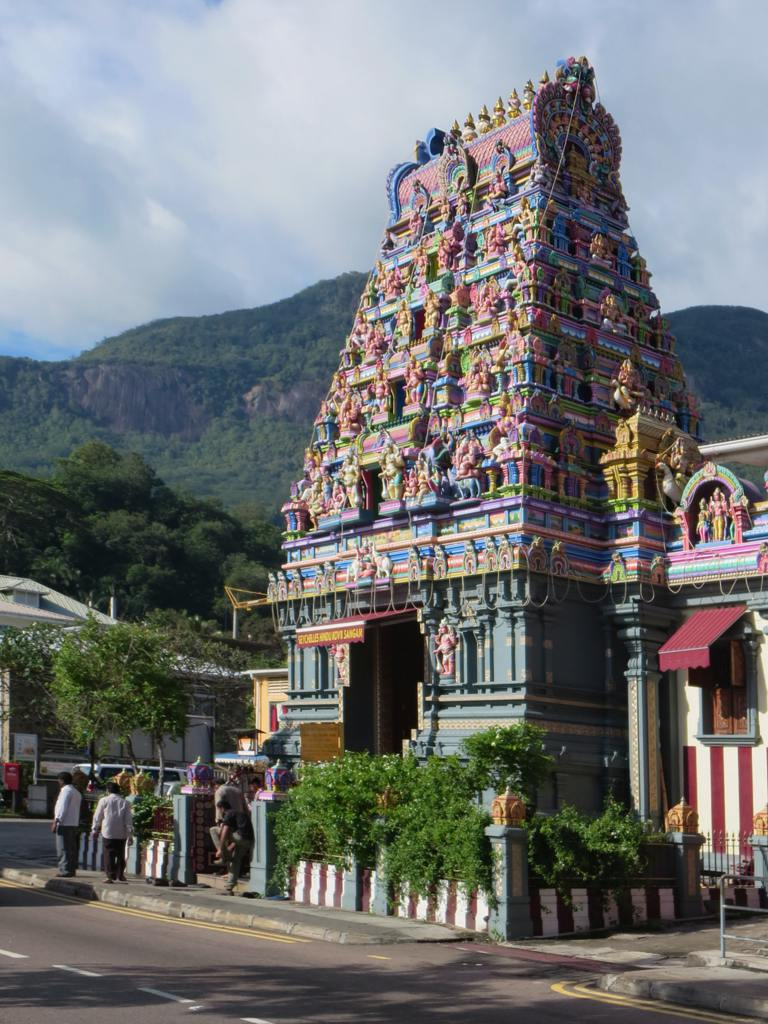
A Tamil Hindu temple in Victoria, the capital of Seychelles

Indians represent a small minority, at just over 6% of the total population

The majority of Indo-Seychellois are Hindus (60%) from current-day Tamil Nadu and the Kutch region in the present state of Gujarat. Others are Indian Jains, Muslims, Christians, and others. They speak Seychellois Creole, and Tamil, Gujarati and Hindi. Typically they constitute the farming, manufacturing entrepreneurs, construction entrepreneurs, wholesalers and traders community in Seychelles. They are mostly settled in the island of Mahe, some on Praslin and La Digue, with cities such as Victoria exhibiting higher concentrations of Indo-Seychellois.

== Impact ==
Many Indo-Seychellois have intermarried with non-Indian ethnic groups, and their children are usually classified as a part of the Creole majority. They have had a noticeable impact on the Seychelles, states the Ministry of External Affairs of the Government of India, "Overall, it is believed that more than 82% of the population of Seychelles has some Indian roots. Many local shops cater to the needs of the Diaspora by stocking Indian consumer items. The community has established a Hindu temple that is run by the Hindu Kovil Sangam. There is also here an Indo-Seychelles Friendship Association and a Hindu Council of Seychelles".

== See also ==
- Tamil Seychellois
- Hinduism in Seychelles
- Satya Naidu- first Hindu member of Seychelles National Assembly.
