= Hodoul =

Hodoul is a surname. Notable people with the surname include:

- Jacques Hodoul (1943–2021), Seychellois judge and politician
- Jean-François Hodoul (1766–1835), French sea captain, corsair, merchant, and plantation owner
- Jean-Louis Hodoul (born 1946), French footballer
