= Payette =

Payette may refer to:

== Places ==
- Payette, Idaho
- Payette County, Idaho
- Payette Lake, a natural lake in southwestern Idaho
- Payette National Forest, Idaho
- Payette Peak, in the Sawtooth Range of Idaho
- Payette River, Idaho

== People ==
- Andre Payette (born 1976), Canadian ice hockey player
- Brayden Payette (born 2000), Canadian curler
- Fernand Payette (1921–1993), Canadian wrestler
- Francois Payette (1793–after 1844), North American fur trader
- Jean Payette (born 1946), Canadian ice hockey player
- Julie Payette, Canadian astronaut, 29th Governor General of Canada
- Lise Payette (1931–2018), Canadian journalist
- Louis Payette (1854–1932), Canadian construction contractor and mayor of Montreal, Canada

== See also ==
- 14574 Payette
- USS Payette County (LST-1079)
- Payet, a surname
