= Pierre Dastros-Géze =

French diplomat

Pierre Dastros-Géze (1925–1984), was a French diplomat. He was known as the composer of the Seychelles national anthem from 1978 until 1996, Fyer Seselwa.

He was given responsibility during the France-Albert René regime in Seychelles to develop a music education program in Seychellois schools. He also envisaged the Seychelles Music Festival in 1978.
