= Payet =

Payet is a surname, and may refer to:

- Alain Payet (1947–2007), French director of porn movies
- Anne-Marie Payet (born 1949), French politician, representing Réunion
- David Payet, Seychellois politician
- Dimitri Payet (born 1987), French football player
- Jacques Payet (born 1957), French aikido master
- Laëtitia Payet (born 1985), French judoka
- Manu Payet (born 1975), French comedian and actor
- Marie Payet (born 1992), French beauty pageant winner from Réunion
- Pascal Payet (born 1963), French criminal, serial escaper from prison
- Rolph Payet (born 1968), Seychellois researcher and speaker on environmental policy

== See also ==
- Payette (disambiguation)
