= Gérard Hoarau =

Seychellois politician

- Born: 7 December 1950
- Died: 29 November 1985 (aged 34); Edgware, London, England
- Occupation: Politician
- Known for: Opposition movement in Seychelles; Seychelles National Movement

Gérard Hoarau (7 December 1950 – 29 November 1985) was Seychellois opposition politician who led the Movement for the Resistance (Mouvement pour la Résistance, MPR), a London-based exile group that sought the peaceful overthrow of France-Albert René, who had come to power on 5 June 1977 in a coup d'état.

Hoarau was assassinated on 29 November 1985 by an unidentified gunman on the doorstep of his home in Edgware, in North London.

== Career ==
Hoarau was an educated young Seychellois with a degree in philosophy and theology from an Italian university. Consequently, he was fluent in Latin and Italian, as well as in English and French.

After independence he worked as special assistant to President James Mancham at State House, as head of the nascent foreign ministry. He was also a great footballer and gained many caps for the Seychelles National Team. Hoarau opposed the creation of the one-party state and the decision by Rene to close down all football clubs in Seychelles and plan the incarceration of all youngsters reaching the age of sixteen into political education camps for two years, which Rene called the National Youth Service (NYS).

Hoarau was targeted by the new regime. The targeting became more evident after the school children demonstration in October 1979 against the National Youth Service.

On 15 November 1979, Hoarau and 100 others were rounded up by the police and held incommunicado without charge or trial at the Union Vale Prison guarded by young Seychellois soldiers led by Tanzanian troops. When he was released nine months later, he was placed under house arrest until he was escorted by security police out of the country. Hoarau then moved to South Africa.

== 1981 coup attempt ==
On 5 November 1981 Hoarau checked into Nairobi's 680 Hotel whose manager, the Austrian-born Gerry Saurer, had previously managed the prestigious Pirates Arms Hotel in Seychelle’s Victoria City and whose clientele included billionaire arms-dealer Adnan Khashoggi. Hoarau was met by his fellow exile/assistant Paul Chow. The two stayed at 680 Hotel for three days and vanished. Kenyan journalists later reported that the two were in town on behalf of Mancham, who they wanted to restore to power with the help of UK, Zimbabwe and South African mercenaries with Kenya as part of the operation base. While in Nairobi, the two were also seen at the offices of SunBird Aviation at Wilson Airport where they booked a Beechcraft Super King Air 200, registration number N 821CA. Sunbird Aviation, now AirKenya, was owned by Andrew Cole (later Lord Enniskileen), a former managing director of Kenya Airways, and a close ally of then powerful Attorney General Charles Njonjo and then Police Commissioner, Ben Gethi. The aircraft was intended to ferry Mancham and a close circle of supporters from Mombasa to Seychelles after the unsuccessful coup attempt, the shadow-cabinet posing as American tourists. Hoarau would have assumed either the name SPC Bowman or Nescott. In 1982 the South African Police found a tape made by Gerard Hoarau that was to be broadcast upon the successful outcome of the coup, Gerard was living in Durban South Africa at the time and the Seychelles Police were calling for Gerards arrest in order that he could stand trial in Seychelles, following a tip off Gerard fled South Africa and eventually ended up in UK.

== Murder ==
The British police have never solved his murder, but the René government was highly implicated. As well as the hired hit-man, British police also believed that there was another individual—believed to be a Seychellois—who knew Hoarau and was able to identify him to the foreign assassin. Neither Hoarau's assassin nor his accomplice has been caught. British police did arrest a number for tapping Hoarau's telephone line, who were recommended to the Seychelles government by Ian Withers, who worked as a security adviser and was himself arrested in 2018.

James Mancham stated that "we know for a fact that the house of many exile groups were broken into and bugged by agents of the René government and now if they are prepared to pay agents to bug our houses so they should able to do a lot more". He went on to say that " he was very disturbed, once madness starts you don`t know where it stops". The murder was headline news in the UK and Mike Cobb, a senior Metropolitan police press officer at Scotland Yard stated "the fact that it was being dealt with by the anti-terrorist branch at Scotland Yard obviously suggests that there is some political background to the shooting".

Charles Meynell, editor of Africa Confidential, explained that " judging by recent history in the Seychelles where a lot of people have disappeared, I think it's highly likely that the René government is behind this. René has himself said that the leader of the opposition over here, Mr Hoarau was public enemy number one so I think it would be very hard to come to any other conclusion at this stage". He further indicated that "much more likely is a straight forward political assassination whereby somebody is given a large amount of money and told to get on with it".

Paul Chow, the Secretary General of the Seychelles National Movement, boldly stated that "there is no doubt it is Mr René, the Marxist President of Seychelles. Only last month his party congress passed a resolution to the effect that he should take action against enemies of the revolution in Seychelles and abroad".

Grover Norquist, a powerful and very influential Republican lobbyist, was hired by communist France-Albert René to lobby before Congress. Asked how he could have a communist ruler who had been accused of human rights abuses as a client, Norquist stated that René was "a guy who preferred to not have elections for a number of years," and said of René's human rights record, "there were one or two people who people were suspected done in." It was also stated that whilst René denied involvement in the assassination, he admitted to bugging Hoarau's telephone and to listening in on Hoarau's last phone call.

British police had discovered that Hoarau's telephone line was systematically bugged by these agents by placing a device in a junction box. The recordings were made from a safe house bought specially for that purpose from funds transferred from a secret account in Jersey. During his last phone call Hoarau changed the time of a doctor's appointment. This information was necessary for the assassin, in order to lay in wait for him that day. British police later identified the murder weapon as a Sterling machine gun. This was the type used by the Seychelles police.

Gérard Hoarau is buried in London, his body specially preserved in a zinc casket so that it can eventually be repatriated to the Seychelles.
