= People's Assembly of Seychelles =

Former legislature of Seychelles (1979–1993)

The People's Assembly of Seychelles (French: Assemblée du peuple de Seychelles) was the legislature of Seychelles from 1979 to 1993. It preceded the current legislature of Seychelles, the National Assembly.

== History ==
After being formed in 1979, Assembly elections were held in the same year from 23 to 26 June. The SPPF won all the 23 elected seats. The same results were produced in the 1983 election on 7 August and on the 1987 election on 6 December. From 20 to 23 July 1993, the new legislative elections were held with the SPPF winning again. After multiparty elections and democratization, the SPPF still won 27 out of the 33 elected seats, with the other 5 seats voting for the SPD. On 30 July, the People's Assembly was replaced with the National Assembly, as the 1st Assembly gained its first sitting.

== Function ==
The government ministers came to the legislature to answer questions by the districts’ representatives and pass bills. This process resembled a legislature which operated on a platform separate from that of the government.

The Assembly had a separate secretariat, was chaired by a chairperson, and was composed of representatives of their specific electoral district.

== See also ==
- Politics of Seychelles
- National Assembly (Seychelles)
- One party rule in Seychelles
- France-Albert René
