= Geva René =

First lady of Seychelles (1932–2023)

First Lady of Seychelles
- In office 5 June 1977 – 1992
- President: France-Albert René
- Preceded by: Position established
- Succeeded by: Sarah Zarqani

Personal details
- Born: Geva Adam; 30 October 1932 Victoria, Seychelles
- Died: 11 May 2023 (aged 90)
- Spouse(s): Michel Savy (m. 1958–?; his death) France-Albert René (m. 1975; div. 1992)
- Children: 3 sons

Geva René (née Adam; October 30, 1932 – May 11, 2023) was a Seychellois educator, school administrator, and children's rights activist. She served as the inaugural First Lady of Seychelles from 1977 until 1992 as the second wife of President France-Albert René. René was also the longest serving first lady in the history of the Seychelles.

== Biography ==
=== Early life and career ===
René was born Geva Adam in Victoria, Seychelles, on October 30, 1932, to Louis Adam and Angela (née Uzice). Her parents were from Praslin, the second largest island in the Seychelles. The oldest of her parents' six children, her siblings include John Adam, a tennis player and former chairman of the Seychelles Tennis Association. René spent much of her childhood living in the Outer Islands of the Seychelles, where he father worked as an island manager and administrator.

Adam was homeschooled by her mother, a teacher, until she was 11-years-old. She then enrolled in the Saint Joseph of Cluny Convent school in Victoria and completed her high school certificate. She then received scholarship to study education and obtain a teaching license in the United Kingdom.

Geva Adam returned to the Seychelles during the mid-1950s. where she pursued a career as a schoolteacher and administrator, including a tenure as the head teacher of the Seychelles College Primary and Modern School. She also served as the principal and co-founder of the Teacher Training College, which opened in 1959. Additionally, she helped establish the Seychelles International School.

In 1958, Adam married Michel Savy, with whom she had three sons, David, Glenny, and Francis. David Savy is a longtime executive at Air Seychelles, the country's national airline. She returned to the United Kingdom in 1963 to complete more postgraduate studies in child psychology and education.

=== First lady of Seychelles ===
In 1975, 43-year-old Geva Savy, a widow and mother of three, married France-Albert René, the second marriage for both. The couple had no children together, but France-Albert René treated her three sons as his own. Each of her sons eventually became executives in important entities within the Seychellois tourism industry, including roles at the Island Development Company, Air Seychelles, and the Seychelles Tourism Board.

On June 4–5, 1977, her husband, then Prime Minister France-Albert René overthrew President James Mancham while he was traveling to the United Kingdom. Geva René became the first ever First Lady of Seychelles, as founding President Mancham had been divorced during his presidency.

Geva René focused on issues related to education, children, and children's rights during her tenure as Seychelles' first lady. She was the founder of several charitable organizations, including the National Council for Children (NCC), the Children's Ark, and the President's Village orphanage.

She remained first lady for seventeen years from 1977 until her divorce from President France-Albert René in 1992, becoming the longest-serving first lady in the country's history. She never remarried after her divorce.

=== Later life ===
René remained active with the National Council for Children (NCC), which she had established as first lady, until her retirement in 2011.

Geva René died on May 11, 2023, at the age of 90.

== See also ==
- Education in Seychelles
