= 2011 Seychellois parliamentary election =

Legislative election held in Seychelles

← 2007	29 September-1 October 2011	2016 →

All seats in the National Assembly
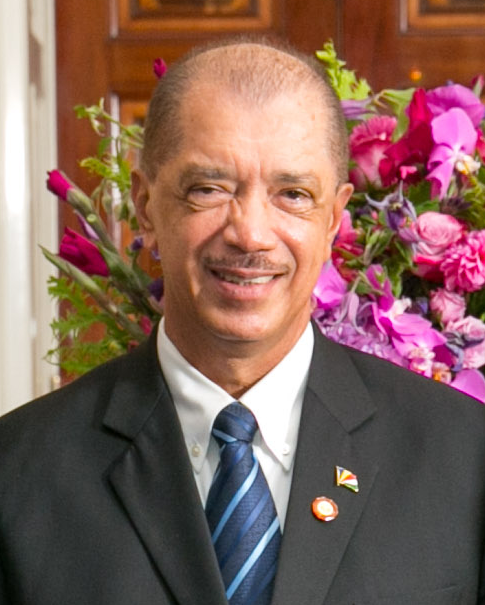

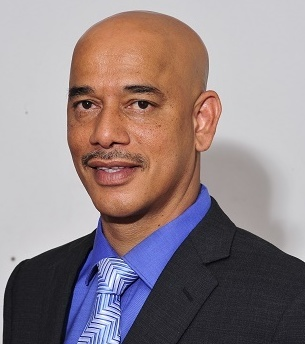
	First party	Second party
Leader	James Michel	David Pierre
Party	PP	PDM
Leader's seat	Did not contest	Proportional
Last election	23 seats, 56.76%	–
Seats won	33	1
Seat change	▲10	New
Popular vote	31,123	3,828
Percentage	88.56%	10.89%
Swing	▲31.80%	–
- Results of the legislative election.

Parliamentary elections were held in Seychelles from 29 September to 1 October 2011. The elections were boycotted by all the main opposition parties. As a result, the People's Party won 33 of the 34 seats in the National Assembly.

== Background ==
The 2011 elections in Seychelles were the fifth round of democratic elections since the country became an independent republic and separated from the United Kingdom. The Seychelles became a one-party state under France-Albert René, but were restored to a multi-party system beginning in 1991. The previous National Assembly elections in 2007 had not seen any change in seats for any parties. The 2011 National Assembly elections, which were initially supposed to occur in April 2012, were held earlier than expected due to a dissolution of the National Assembly on July 12, 2011. The dissolution was temporarily invalidated by the Constitutional Court on 18 July 2011 on procedural grounds; the Court ordered the Assembly to reconvene on 19 July 2011. However, the Assembly was dissolved in July. The leading opposition parties SNP and NDP both boycotted the election, leading to the overwhelming People's Party victory.

The 2011 elections were the first democratic elections in the country since the 2008 economic crisis. Previously, the Seychellois economy was characterized by price, trade and foreign exchange controls, a prominent role for parastatal companies, and robust debt-funded development spending, leading to the near-depletion of official foreign exchange reserves in October 2008. Seychelles defaulted on interest payments, which severely damaged its credibility as a borrower. The government subsequently turned to the International Monetary Fund (IMF) for support, and in an attempt to meet the conditions for a stand-by loan, began implementing a program of radical reforms. The economic circumstances led the leading People's Party to abandon many of its more socialist stances in favor of economic liberalization.

== Electoral system ==
Selection of National Assembly representatives comes from the 25 administrative regions. The National Assembly is called The Seychelles National Assembly and consists of 32 members, of which 25 are directly elected representing the 25 electoral districts in the country through first past the post. Seven are proportionately elected depending on the percentage of votes each party has.

== Contesting parties ==
- Parti Lepep leader James Michel was the winner of the 2011 presidential election and President of Seychelles from 2004 to 2016. He had previously served as a member of the Executive Committee of the Seychelles People's United Party from 1974 to 1977; member of the Central Executive Committee for the Seychelles People's Progressive Front (SPPF); and SPPF's Deputy Secretary-General, then Secretary General. Despite his party’s near-total dominance of the Seychellois political landscape, Michel claimed that the Parti Lepep remained committed to public political engagement, regardless of party divisions.
- David Pierre, in the wake of the boycott led by the SNP and the NDP, formed a breakaway faction of the SNP called the Popular Democratic Movement (PDM). After taking his oath of allegiance, Pierre stated that his party would be governed and held accountable by the Seychellois people, and that he would continue to advocate for a multi-party system in Seychelles. He also called on President Michel to engage in an open and frank dialogue about issues related to the “welfare, prosperity and happiness of our people”
- Danny Sopha ran as an independent candidate, citing his commitment to the local people in his jurisdiction and desire for governmental transparency. Originally from the island of Anse Aux Pins, Sopha is an artist trained in Fine Art at the School of Art and Design Seychelles Polytechnic. Sopha has participated consistently in politics for nearly twenty years, and ran for a seat in the 2016 National Assembly election.
- George Prudence was the final independent candidate in 2011. Though previously affiliated with Parti Lepep, Prudence ran as an independent in the 2016 National Assembly election, stating that he was committed to being a “neutral voice” in Seychellois politics.
- Regis Francourt was party leader for the Seychelles Patriotic Movement (SPM). Francourt notably resisted joining the opposition coalition created by Mancienne.

== Results ==
The Seychelles National Party, the main opposition party, decided to boycott the election to protest the government's failure to revise electoral laws about the amount of money parties could spend on campaigning. The People’s Party (PL) garnered 88.56% or 31,123 of the vote. The Popular Democratic Movement (PDM) earned about 10.89% or 3,828 of the vote. Independent candidates garnered only 194 votes, all from one district, which accounted for 0.55% of the vote. These percentages are calculated out of the total number of valid votes cast. There were 16,447 invalid votes cast out of 51,592 total votes cast. This means that only 68.12% of votes cast were valid. Voter turnout was 74.3% of 69,480 registered voters. The PL won in all 25 districts, giving them every directly elected seat. Because they won such a large percentage of the total vote, they also won eight of the nine proportionally allocated seats. After the 2011 election, the PL controlled 33 of the 34 seats in the National Assembly.

Party	Votes	%	Seats			
Party	Votes	%	FPTP	PR	Total	+/–
People's Party	31,123	88.56	25	8	33	+10
Popular Democratic Movement	3,828	10.89	0	1	1	New
Independents	194	0.55	0	0	0	0
Total	35,145	100.00	25	9	34	0
Valid votes	35,145	68.12				
Invalid/blank votes	16,447	31.88				
Total votes	51,592	100.00				
Registered voters/turnout	69,480	74.25				
Source: ECS, IPU

== Reactions and aftermath ==
The National Assembly election was boycotted by both the main opposition Seychelles National Party (SNP) and the New Democratic Party (NDP). A small breakaway faction of the SNP called the Popular Democratic Movement (PDM) did contest the election, but earned no seats in parliament. PDM leader David Pierre and Parti Lepep (People’s Party) leader James Michel both expressed dissatisfaction with the way parliamentary sears were distributed - Michel argued that PP should have been given all of the seats, given their overwhelming majority, while Pierre had expected to gain at least one seat in parliament. Pierre argued further that the dominance of Parti Lepep boded ill for the fate of multi-party democracy in Seychelles, and that there was now no platform through which opposition could be voiced. Nonetheless, the election was declared to be largely free and fair according to monitors from the Southern African Development Community.
