= 1983 Seychellois parliamentary election =

Parliamentary elections were held in the Seychelles on 7 August 1983 for the People's Assembly. The Seychelles People's Progressive Front was the sole legal party at the time, and all candidates were members. Thirty candidates stood for 23 seats, 17 of them unopposed. A further two members were appointed by President France-Albert René.

== Results ==
Party	Votes	%	Seats	+/–
Seychelles People's Progressive Front			23	0
Presidential appointees			2	0
Total			25	0
Total votes	20,705	–		
Registered voters/turnout	34,908	59.31		
Source: IPU
