= 1989 Seychellois presidential election =

← 1984	9–11 June 1989	1993 →
- Registered: 42,861
- Turnout: 91.54%
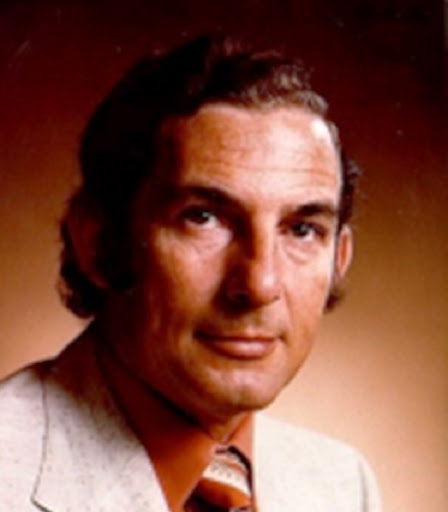
Nominee	France-Albert René
Party	FPPS
Popular vote	37,703
Percentage	96.21%
President before election
France-Albert René
FPPS
Elected President
France-Albert René
FPPS

Presidential elections were held in the Seychelles in June 1989. Following a coup in 1977, the Seychelles People's Progressive Front was the sole legal party, and its leader, France-Albert René, was the only candidate in the election. He was re-elected with 96.1% of the votes on a 91.5% turnout.

== Results ==
Candidate	Party	Votes	%
France-Albert René	Seychelles People's Progressive Front	37,703	96.21
Against		1,486	3.79
Total		39,189	100.00
Valid votes		39,189	99.88
Invalid/blank votes		48	0.12
Total votes		39,237	100.00
Registered voters/turnout		42,861	91.54
Source: EISA
