= Vicky Theresine =

- Occupations: Politician, teacher
- Years active: 2007

Vicky Theresine is a member of the National Assembly of Seychelles. A teacher by profession, she is a member of the Seychelles People's Progressive Front, and was first elected to the Assembly on a proportional basis in 2007.
