= Marie-Antoinette Rose =

Seychellois politician

Marie Antoniette Rose
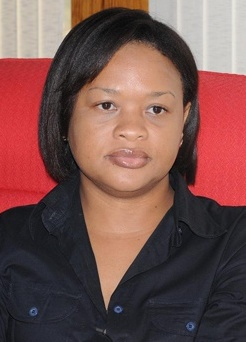
- Citizenship: Seychelles
- Occupations: Politician, journalist
- Political party: Seychelles People's Progressive Front
- Children: 2

Marie-Antoinette Rose is a Seychellois politician and journalist. She is a member of the National Assembly of Seychelles. She subscribes for Seychelles People's Progressive Front, and was first elected to the Assembly in 2006 on a proportional basis; she was re-elected in 2007.

In 2006, she was first elected as a member of the National Assembly in a by-election on the SPPF party list and was re-elected in 2011 for the SPPF, which was renamed Parti Lepep. She is currently the leader of the Parti Lepep parliamentary group and thus the majority leader in parliament. She is also a member of the Parliamentary Association of the Commonwealth of Nations and a member of the Committee on Reforms and Modernization.

== Educational ==
- Bachelor of Arts (Double Major) in Communication Studies and English & Comparative Literature
- Master of Arts in Global Diplomacy, awarded with Distinction.

== Achievement ==
- Ambassador of the Republic of Seychelles (2016 – Present)
- Appointed as Ambassador of the Republic of Seychelles in 2016.
- In 2017, officially accredited as Ambassador to the Republic of South Africa and other Southern African countries at the bilateral level.
- Served concurrently as the Permanent Representative of Seychelles to both the Southern African Development Community (SADC) and the Common Market for Eastern and Southern Africa (COMESA).
- Currently engaged as a consultant, advising public and private sector entities on global and national public policies and strategic communications.

== Personal life ==
Married with two sons.
