= Ansley Constance =

Member of the National Assembly of Seychelles

Personal details
- Citizenship: Seychelles
- Occupation: Politician, teacher

Ansley Constance is a member of the National Assembly of Seychelles. A teacher by profession, he is a member of the Seychelles People's Progressive Front, and has been elected to the Assembly twice.
