= Saint Louis, Seychelles =

Coordinates: 4°38′S 55°26′E

Saint Louis
- District

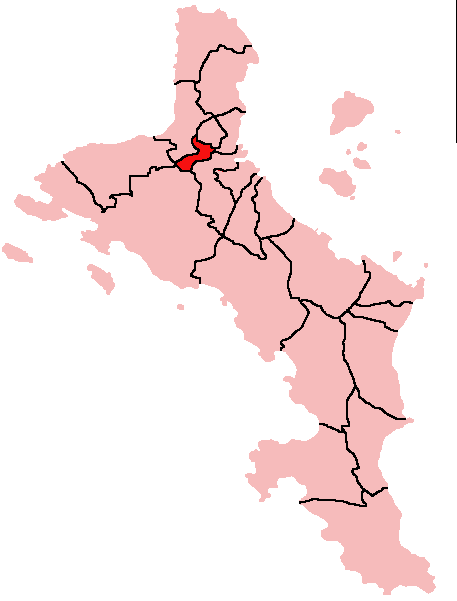
- Location within Mahé Island, Seychelles
- Country: Seychelles

Government
  - District Administrator: Rachel Joseph
  - Member of National Assembly: Hon. Satya Naidu (Linyon Demokratik Seselwa)

Population (2019 Estimate)
  - Total: 3,241
- Time zone: Seychelles Time

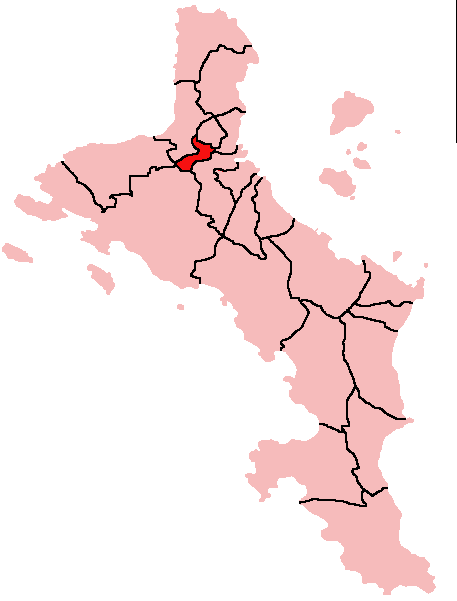
Location of Saint Louis District on Mahé Island, Seychelles

Saint Louis (French pronunciation: [sɛ̃ lwi]) is an administrative district of Seychelles located on the island of Mahé. It is the smallest district of Seychelles with an area slightly more than a square kilometer.

== Notable people ==
- Linda Ramkalawan (born 1963), First Lady of Seychelles
