= La Plaine St. André =

National heritage site in Seychelles

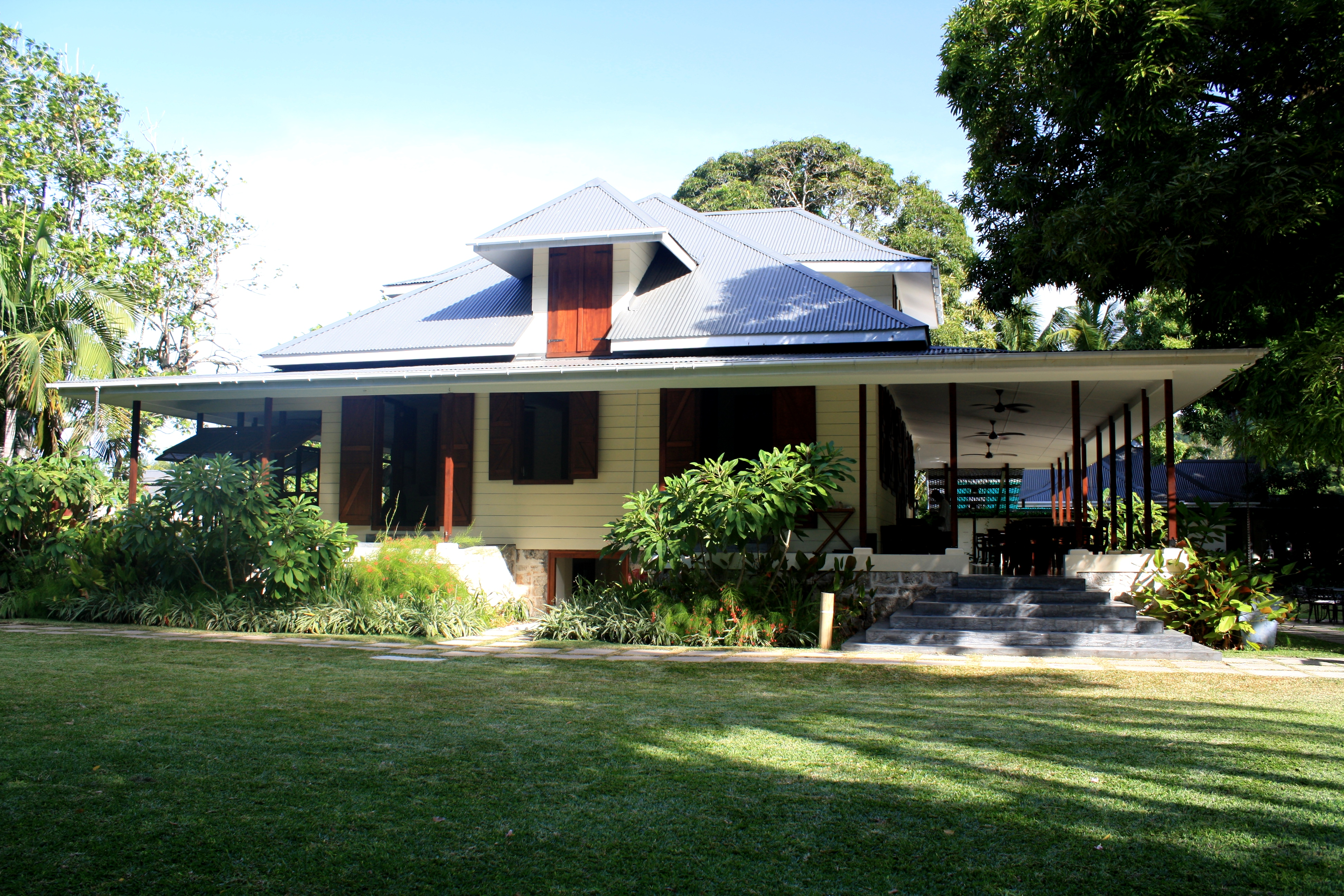
- The Plantation House at La Plaine St. André in Victoria, Seychelles (2012)

- Location within Seychelles
- Type: National Heritage Site
- Location: Au Cap, Mahé, Seychelles
- Coordinates: 4.719424°S 55.523092°E
- Area: 15 acres (6.1 ha)
- Opened: 1792
- Operator: Trois Frères Distillery

La Plaine St. André is a colonial-era sugarcane plantation located in the southeast of Mahé, Seychelles.

== History ==
The national heritage estate, situated in Au Cap and formerly recognised as Eco-Musée, traces its origins to 1792. Originally owned by Jean-Francois Marie Jorre de St. Jorre, who hailed from Saint Andre de La Reunion, the estate was named La Plaine St. Andre. It stretched from Au Cap to Anse Royale. During Seychelles' time as a French colony, it was a major plantation, supplying much of the island's southern area with agricultural produce.

In 1996, the national anthem of Seychelles, Koste Seselwa was composed by David André and Georges Payet at an old house at La Plaine St. Andre.

In 2007, Trois Frères Distillery, the creators of Takamaka Rum, entered a long-term lease agreement with the Seychelles Heritage Foundation (SHF) to oversee the management of the estate.

=== Historical discrepancies ===
There isn't enough evidence to confirm that "La Plaine Saint André" was built around 1792. According to local historian Julien Durup, the wooden structures wouldn't last that long in Seychelles' humid climate with termites. Jean-François Marie Jorre de Saint Jorre, born in La Réunion in 1758, arrived in Seychelles in April 1790, not as one of the first settlers as previously believed. He was granted land at Pointe La Rue and Anse Aux Courbes, while his wife also received land in 1792. If Jean-François named his property "La Plaine Saint André" out of nostalgia for his birthplace, it doesn't mean he built his mansion at the same time.

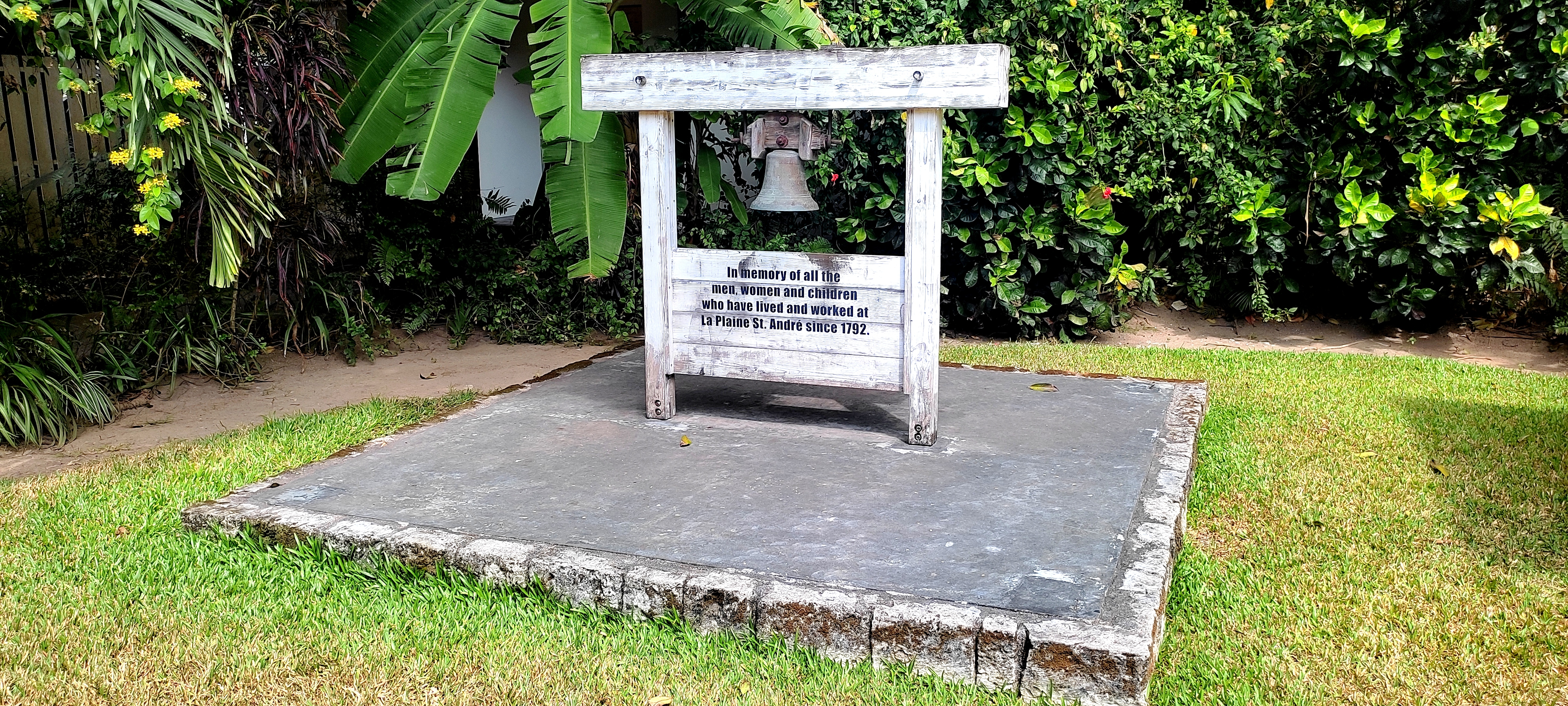
Plantation Bell at La Plaine St Andre

Also, the original masonry basement of the 'Plantation House' suggests it was constructed between 1844 and 1860 during the ownership of André Despilly Jorre de Saint Jorre. Despilly, a notable Master Mason and notary, was associated with the 'La Réunion Sincère' and later the 'Lodge Union Sincère,' founded by Pascal de Giovanni in 1869 at Royal Street, Paris. The 'La Réunion Sincère,' acquired by Ange Joseph Marie Cordouan in 1831, ceased operations in 1851. The 'Plantation House' served as a meeting venue for the Masonic community on various occasions.

== Architecture ==
The buildings on the plantation represent colonial-era architecture. The plantation house, with its distinctive Creole design characterised by wide verandas and steep-pitched roofs, is a focal point of the estate. The estate also features an herbs & medicinal garden, and a restaurant serving Creole cuisine.

== Distillery ==
Takamaka Rum
- Type: Rum
- Manufacturer: Trois Frères Distillery
- Origin: Seychelles
- Introduced: 2002
- Alcohol by volume: 25%–69%
- Proof (US): 94%
- Variants: St André; Dark Spiced Rum; Extra Noir; White Rum; Takamaka 69; Coconut Rum; Pineapple Rum; Mango and Passion Rum
- Related products: List of rum producers
- Website: www.takamakarum.com

Takamaka rum is a brand of rum that is distilled, aged and blended at the Trois Frères Distillery on the site of La Plaine St André. The distillery has been operating since 2002, and was founded by the d’Offay brothers, Richard and Bernard d’Offay. It is the first and only commercial rum producer and exporter in Seychelles.

=== History ===
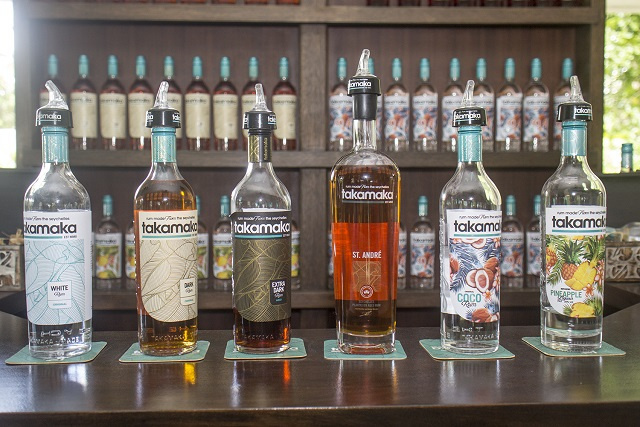
Bottles of Takamaka rum of Seychelles

Rum was first introduced to the Seychelles in the mid 16th century by the British Navy. Sugar cane cultivation on the islands began in the late 1800s and early 1900s, primarily to supplement the supply of sugar from infrequent visits from ships. As the delivery of sugar to the islands became more frequent, the use of sugar cane began to evolve – initially to making fermented cane juice known as 'Baka'.

Residents also have a history of making their own rhum arrangé, a mixture of local rum and a blend of herbs and spices (usually a family recipe). This is traditionally served as a digestif (post-meal drink).

The Trois Frères Distillery was founded in 2002 and is located on an old tropical spice plantation site (La Plaine St André). The d'Offay family was granted a lease for the property, which is a national heritage site, and restored it for two and half years to set up the distillery. The Trois Frères distillery was introduced in the Merj Exchange Limited (Seychelles stock exchange) in 2021.
