= Linda Ramkalawan =

First Lady of Seychelles (b. 1963)

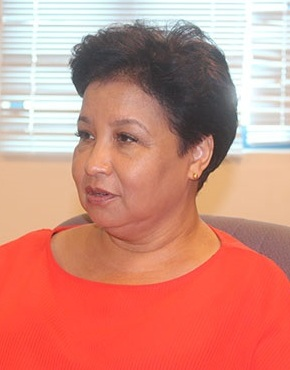

First Lady of Seychelles
- In office 26 October 2020 – 26 October 2025
- President: Wavel Ramkalawan
- Preceded by: Natalie Michel (2013)
- Succeeded by: Veronique Herminie

Personal details
- Born: October 19, 1963 (age 63) Saint Louis, Mahé, Seychelles
- Spouse: Wavel Ramkalawan (m. May 1985)
- Children: 3

Linda Ramkalawan (born 19 October 1963) was the First Lady of Seychelles from 2020 to 2025, as the wife of Wavel Ramkalawan, 5th President of Seychelles.

== Biography ==
Ramkalawan was born in Saint Louis district on Mahé island and raised in Bel Ombre. She worked in the local tourism industry, at Le Meridien Fisherman’s Cove hotel, for over forty years, retiring in 2019.

She married Wavel Ramkalawan on 4 May 1985. They have three sons: Samuel, Caleb and Amos. When her husband was elected 5th President of Seychelles in 2020, she became the country's First Lady. Ramkalawan said that she "will seek to favour children and education" in the role.

As First Lady of Seychelles, Ramkalawan launched The Hope Foundation and became its patron in November 2020. She is also patron of the White Feather Fund, which supports orphans, and has hosted receptions for retired Seychellois teachers.

In 2021, she met with the Women’s Parliamentary Caucus of Seychelles. In 2025, she addressed Judiciary staff at the Palais de Justice to celebrate International Women's Day.

She joined her husband on visits to the Maldives (2023), the United Kingdom (2023), the Vatican and Italy (2024), Cuba (2025), and Ghana (2025). Her husband stepped down from the presidency of the country on 26 October 2025.
