= Popular assembly (disambiguation) =

A popular assembly is a gathering to address issues through direct democracy.

Popular assembly may also refer to:

- Popular Assembly (Asamblea Popular), a socialist electoral coalition in Uruguay
- Popular Assembly of the Peoples of Oaxaca, an organization assembled in 2006 in the Mexican state of Oaxaca
- Popular Assembly for Progress Party (Rassemblement populaire pour le Progrès), a political party in Djibouti
- Patriote popular assemblies, political gatherings in Lower Canada in 1837
- Sree Moolam Popular Assembly, the first popularly elected legislature in India

== See also ==
- Citizens' assembly
- People's Assembly (disambiguation)
