= 1987 Seychellois parliamentary election =

Parliamentary elections were held in the Seychelles on 6 December 1987 for the People's Assembly. The Seychelles People's Progressive Front was the sole legal party at the time, and all candidates were members. Thirty-six candidates stood for 23 seats, 10 of them unopposed. A further two members were appointed by President France-Albert René.

== Results ==
Party	Votes	%	Seats	+/–
Seychelles People's Progressive Front			23	0
Presidential appointees			2	0
Total			25	0
Total votes	28,410	–		
Registered voters/turnout	43,051	65.99		
Source: IPU
