= Marc Naiken =

Seychellois politician

- Occupation: Politician
- Years active: 2007

Marc Naiken is a member of the National Assembly of Seychelles. He is a member of the Seychelles People's Progressive Front, and was first elected to the Assembly in 2007.

== See also ==
- Index of Seychelles-related articles
- Outline of Seychelles
- Politics of Seychelles
