= Rita Sinon =

Kenya-born Seychellois politician

- Born: 1943; Kenya
- Died: 1989 (aged 45–46)
- Occupation: Politician

Rita Sinon (1943 – 8 May 1989) was a Kenya-born Seychellois politician who became the first female Minister of Seychelles was when she was appointed Minister for Internal Affairs on 19 September 1986.

Her husband Guy Sinon and son Peter Sinon also served in the Cabinet of Seychelles.

Sinon was a close confidant of France-Albert René, and worked closely during the early years of the republic with Sylvette Frichot.
