= Jennifer Vel =

Seychelles politician

- Occupations: [, economist

Jennifer Vel is a Seychelles politician and economist. She is a member of the National Assembly of Seychelles. She is a member of the Seychelles People's Progressive Front, and was first elected to the Assembly in 2007.
