= National People's Assembly =

National People's Assembly may refer to:

- National People's Assembly of Guinea-Bissau, the unicameral legislative body of Guinea-Bissau
- National People's Assembly of Thailand, an citizens' assembly in Thailand concerned with electing members of the Constitution Drafting Assembly
- People's National Assembly, the lower house of the Algerian parliament

== See also ==
- National Assembly, a legislature or house of a bicameral legislature in some countries
- People's Assembly (disambiguation)
