= Marc Volcere =

- Occupation: Politician
- Years active: 2007

Marc Volcere is a member of the National Assembly of Seychelles. He is a member of the Seychelles People's Progressive Front, and was first elected to the Assembly in 2007.
