= Koste Seselwa =

National anthem of Seychelles

English: Unite Seychellois
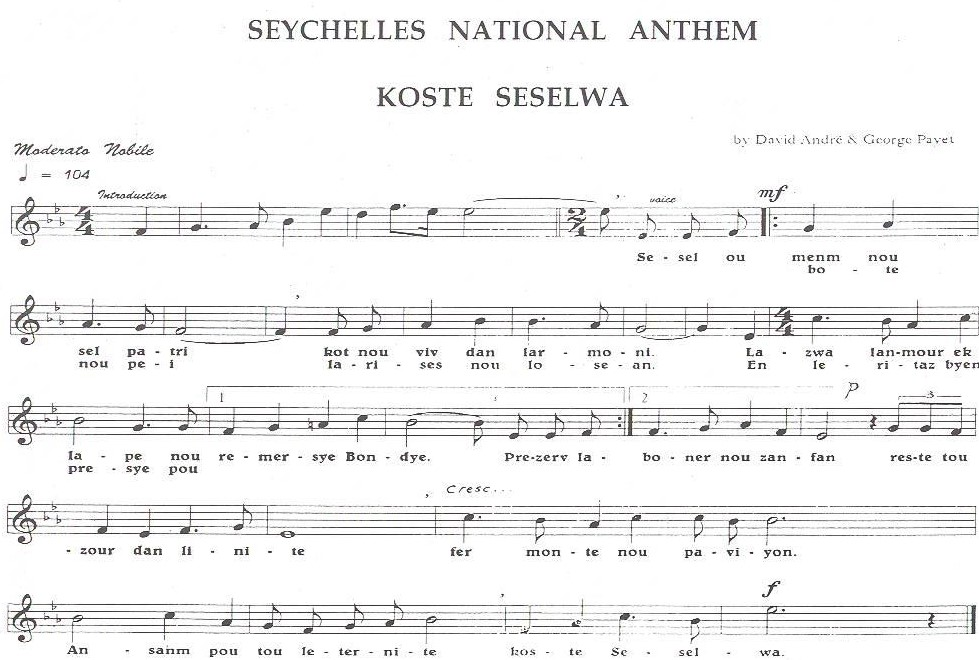
- National anthem of Seychelles
- Lyrics: David François Marc André and George Charles Robert Payet, 1996
- Music: David François Marc André and George Charles Robert Payet, 1996
- Adopted: 1996
- Preceded by: "Fyer Seselwa"

Audio sample
- Koste Seselwa (Instrumental): file; help

"Koste Seselwa" ("Unite Seychellois") is the national anthem of the Seychelles.

== Background ==
The anthem was created through a competition, after the adoption of the Constitution of the Republic of Seychelles, dated 21 June 1993. The constitution stated there was to be a national flag, a national anthem, a national emblem and a national motto. The constitution did not mention any anthems, since the anthem is prescribed by an Act.

The anthem was created by David André and Georges Payet, as an entry for the competition. According to Payet, the anthem was written in a single day.

During the creation of the anthem, they were approached, along with a third individual, Antoine Azemia, by the organising committee, who suggested they work together and come up with something new, as their initial submission each contained something they were looking for. Azemia decided to back out, the duo settled in an old house at La Plaine St. André, where they worked in harmony, pasting bits and pieces, before coming up with the final result.

The arrangement for the anthem was made by Russian orchestra expert and band conductor Anatoli Savatinov.

"Koste Seselwa" was recorded for the first time by the French Republican Guard Band in Paris, where André had the chance to attend and witness the event.

The anthem was adopted as the national anthem of Seychelles on the National Day, at 18 June 1996.

== Lyrics ==
Seychellois Creole original

Sesel ou menm nou sel patri.
Kot nou viv dan larmoni.
Lazwa, lanmour ek lape.
Nou remersye Bondye.

Preserv labote nou pei.
Larises nou losean.
En leritaz byen presye.
Pour boner nou zanfan.

Reste touzour dan linite.
Fer monte nou paviyon.
Ansanm pou tou leternite.
Koste Seselwa!

IPA transcription (Note: See Help:IPA.)

[se.sel u mɛ̃m nu sɛl pa.tɣi]
[kɔt nu viv dã la:.mɔ.ni]
[la.zwa lã.mu: ek la.pɛ]
[nu ɣe.mɛ:.sje bɔ̃.dje]

[pɣe.zɛ:v la.bo.te nu pɛ.i]
[la.ɣi.sɛs nu lɔ.se.ã]
[ɛ̃ le.ɣi.taz bjɛ̃ pɣe.sje]
[pu: bɔ.nɛ: nu zã.fã]

[ɣɛs.te tu.zu: dã li.ni.te]
[fɛ: mɔ̃.te nu pa.vi.jɔ̃]
[ã.sãm pu tu le.tɛ:.ni.te]
[kɔs.te se.sel.wa]

English translation

Seychelles, our only motherland
Where we live in harmony
Happiness, love and peace
We give thanks to God.

Preserve the beauty of our country
The riches of our oceans
A precious heritage
For the happiness of our children.

Live forever in unity
Raise our flag
Together for all eternity
Join together all Seychellois.

French translation

Seychelles, notre seule patrie
Où nous vivons en harmonie
La joie, l'amour et la paix
Nous remercions le Bon Dieu !

Préservons la beauté de notre pays
La richesse de notre océan
Un héritage très précieux
Pour le bonheur de nos enfants

Restons toujours unis
Élevons notre drapeau
Ensemble pour l'éternité
Unissons-nous Seychellois !

== See also ==
- "Fyer Seselwa"
