= Seychelles Movement for Democracy =

Former political party in Seychelles

- Leader: Jacques Hodoul
- Founded: November 1991
- Dissolved: 1992

The Seychelles Movement for Democracy was a political party in Seychelles. It was active in the early 1990s. Its leader was Jacques Hodoul.

The party won 0.77% of the vote for representation of delegates in the constitutional commission of 1992.
