= First Lady of Seychelles =

- Incumbent; Veronique Herminie since 26 October 2025
- Residence: State House, Victoria, Mahé
- Inaugural holder: Geva René
- Formation: 5 June 1977
- Website: First Lady of the Republic of Seychelles

The First Lady of Seychelles, officially the First Lady of the Republic of Seychelles, is the title and position attributed to the wife of the President of Seychelles. The current first lady of Seychelles is Veronique Herminie, wife of President Patrick Herminie, who has held the position since 26 October 2025.

== History ==
The first four presidents of Seychelles - James Mancham, France-Albert René, James Michel, and Danny Faure - all had a history of divorces, leading to lengthy periods when the position of first lady was vacant.

The first president of Seychelles, James Mancham, and his first wife, Heather Evans, divorced in 1974 before the country gained independence from the United Kingdom. Consequently, there was no first lady during his short presidency.

In 1977, then-Prime Minister France-Albert René overthrew Mancham during the 1977 Seychelles coup d'état. His second wife, educator Geva René, became the country's inaugural First Lady. She was also the longest serving first lady in the country's history. Geva René served as first lady for seventeen years from 1977 until her separation and divorce from President René in 1992. President René's and First Lady Geva René's divorce was finalized in April 1993.

Shortly after his divorce, President René married his third wife, Sarah Zarquani, with whom he already had one child, in late June 1993. Zarquani had moved abroad in 1990 after conceiving the couple's first child during an extramarital affair and returned to the Seychelles following the finalization of the president's divorce from Geva René. She became first lady from her marriage in 1993 until 2004 and survived him upon his death in 2019.

Most recently, the position of First Lady of Seychelles was vacant from 2013 until 2020. President James Michel and First Lady Natalie Michel announced their divorce in October 2013. President Michel's successor, President Danny Faure, and his then-wife, Jeannine, also finalized their divorce on 10 October 2016, less than one week before Faure's presidential inauguration, resulting in another vacancy for the role of first lady.

In October 2020, Linda Ramkalawan became the country's first new first lady since 2013. She and her husband, President Wavel Ramkalawan, have been married since May 1985. Unlike their predecessors, neither President Ramkalawan nor First Lady Ramkalawan have any previous marriages.

== First Ladies of Seychelles ==
Name	Portrait	Term began	Term ended	President of Seychelles	Notes
Position Vacant		29 June 1976	5 June 1977	James Mancham	President James Mancham and his first wife, Heather Evans, divorced in 1974 before the country's independence and his presidency.
Geva René		5 June 1977	1992	France-Albert René	Geva René, an educator, was the country's first First Lady, as well as the longest serving first lady of Seychelles. Born Geva Adam, she married France-Albert René in 1975, and became first lady after her husband overthrew President Mancham in June 1977. She served as first lady until their divorce in 1992.
Sarah Zarquani		June 1993	14 July 2004	France-Albert René	President France-Albert René married his third wife, Sarah Zarquani, in June 1993 soon after his divorce from Geva René. First Lady Zarquani was 25 years younger than President René.
Natalie Michel		14 July 2004 (?)	22 October 2013	James Michel	Natalie Michel, the then-wife of President Michel, served as first lady. President Michel and First Lady Natalie Michel announced their intent to divorce on 22 October 2013.
Position Vacant		22 October 2013	26 October 2020	James Michel	President Michel began divorce proceedings in October 2013. He resigned from office on 16 October 2016.
Position Vacant		22 October 2013	26 October 2020	Danny Faure	Then-Vice President Danny Faure and his wife, Jeannine (née De Comarmond) Faure, finalized their divorce on 10 October 2016, less than a week before he became President of Seychelles. There was no first lady during his presidency.
Linda Ramkalawan		26 October 2020	26 October 2025	Wavel Ramkalawan	Linda Ramkalawan, who is retired from the tourism sector, has served as first lady since October 2020. She became the country's first First Lady since 2013.
Veronique Herminie		26 October 2025		Patrick Herminie	
