= Dolor Ernesta =

Personal details
- Citizenship: Seychelles
- Occupation: Politician

Dolor Ernesta is a Seychellois politician, and a former minister for Community Development of the Seychelles. Ernesta served as the Minister for Community Development from July 1993 through to August 1998. In August 1998, Dolor Ernesta became the Minister for Land Use and Housing, a role he remained in until the end of 2000. He was later investigated for corruption by Seychelles’ top court.
