= David Payet =

- Occupations: Physician, Politician

David Payet is a member of the National Assembly of Seychelles. A doctor by profession, he is a member of the Seychelles People's Progressive Front, and was first elected to the Assembly in 2007.
