= 1953 Seychellois parliamentary election =

Parliamentary elections were held in the Seychelles in 1953.

== Electoral system ==
The right to vote was granted to all citizens over the age of 21 who could write their name, paid income tax on an annual income of SR 3,000 or more, and could prove that they had lived in the Seychelles for at least a year. Only around 10% of the population were able to register.

== Results ==
All the seats were won by independents and members of the Seychelles Taxpayers and Producers Association, who primarily represented the interests of large landowners. Voter turnout was only 36%.
