= USS LST-1079 =

1945 LST-542-class tank landing ship

History

United States
- Name: LST-1079 (1945–1955); Payette County (1955–1959)
- Namesake: Payette County, Idaho
- Builder: Bethlehem-Hingham Shipyard, Hingham, Massachusetts
- Yard number: 3469
- Laid down: 30 March 1945
- Launched: 27 April 1945
- Commissioned: 22 May 1945
- Decommissioned: 31 May 1946
- Stricken: 12 March 1948
- Identification: Hull symbol: LST-1079; Code letters: NAKM
- Fate: Laid up in the Pacific Reserve Fleet, Columbia River Group
- Recommissioned: October 1950
- Renamed: 1 July 1955
- Fate: Assigned to Military Sea Transportation Service (MSTS)

United States
- Operator: MSTS
- Out of service: 1 November 1959
- Stricken: 1 November 1959
- Identification: Hull symbol: T-LST-1079
- Fate: Sold for scrapping, 18 May 1961

General characteristics
- Class & type: LST-542-class tank landing ship
- Displacement: 1,625 long tons (1,651 t) (light); 4,080 long tons (4,145 t) (full (seagoing draft with 1,675 short tons (1,520 t) load); 2,366 long tons (2,404 t) (beaching)
- Length: 328 ft (100 m) oa
- Beam: 50 ft (15 m)
- Draft: Unloaded: 2 ft 4 in (0.71 m) forward; 7 ft 6 in (2.29 m) aft; Full load: 8 ft 3 in (2.51 m) forward; 14 ft 1 in (4.29 m) aft; Landing with 500 short tons (450 t) load: 3 ft 11 in (1.19 m) forward; 9 ft 10 in (3.00 m) aft; Limiting 11 ft 2 in (3.40 m); Maximum navigation 14 ft 1 in (4.29 m)
- Installed power: 2 × 900 hp (670 kW) Electro-Motive Diesel 12-567A diesel engines; 1,800 shp (1,300 kW)
- Propulsion: 1 × Falk main reduction gears; 2 × Propellers
- Speed: 11.6 kn (21.5 km/h; 13.3 mph)
- Range: 24,000 nmi (44,000 km; 28,000 mi) at 9 kn (17 km/h; 10 mph) while displacing 3,960 long tons (4,024 t)
- Boats & landing craft carried: 2 x LCVPs
- Capacity: 1,600–1,900 short tons (3,200,000–3,800,000 lb; 1,500,000–1,700,000 kg) cargo depending on mission
- Troops: 16 officers, 147 enlisted men
- Complement: 13 officers, 104 enlisted men
- Armament: Varied, ultimate armament; 2 × twin 40 mm (1.57 in) Bofors guns; 4 × single 40 mm Bofors guns; 12 × 20 mm (0.79 in) Oerlikon cannons

Service record
- Awards: American Campaign Medal; Asiatic–Pacific Campaign Medal; World War II Victory Medal; Navy Occupation Service Medal w/Asia Clasp

USS LST-1079 was an LST-542-class tank landing ship in the United States Navy. Unlike many of her class, which received only numbers and were disposed of after World War II, she survived long enough to be named. On 1 July 1955, all LSTs still in commission were named for US counties or parishes; LST-1079 was given the name Payette County, after the county in Idaho.

== Construction ==
LST-1079 was laid down on 30 March 1945, at Hingham, Massachusetts, by the Bethlehem-Hingham Shipyard; launched on 27 April 1945; and commissioned on 22 May 1945.

== Service history ==
After shakedown, LST-1079 loaded pontoons and cargo at Davisville, Rhode Island, embarked Marines and took aboard ammunition at New York, and sailed 7 July 1945, for the Canal Zone. She arrived at Coco Solo 16 July, and then proceeded to Pearl Harbor where she was lying at anchor in West Loch when the war ended.

On 21 August, she sailed for Guam via Eniwetok and off loaded cargo and passengers on arrival, sailing again 22 September, for Leyte. From Leyte she went to Subic Bay and then returned to Guam 6 November, to embark troops for "Magic Carpet" passage to San Francisco.

She arrived San Francisco 28 December, was assigned to the 19th Fleet and subsequently made preparations for inactivation. LST-1079 decommissioned in March 1946, and was placed in reserve, berthed with the Columbia River Group of the Pacific Reserve Fleet at Puget Sound.

Because of fleet requirements brought about by the Korean War. LST-1079 was recalled for active service and moved to the East Coast. She recommissioned in October 1950, and joined the US Atlantic Fleet. Her first assignment took her to Goose Bay, Labrador, in conjunction with services for the US Army. During this voyage she had a close brush with an iceberg which tore a hole in her bow. She was saved from sure disaster by the intentness to duty of her forward lookout during conditions of extremely heavy fog. Sighting the iceberg dead ahead he quickly gave the alarm, and enabled his ship to avoid a head-on-collision.

She later moved to a more hospitable climate, operating off in Florida in shuttling general stores between Green Cove Springs and Norfolk, Virginia. During 1954–1955, in addition to her normal operations, she was involved in innovative exercises such as LST-helicopter operations, and the use of an LST as a rocket launching platform. On 1 July 1955, she was named Payette County (LST-1079) and operated with a civil service crew until 1 November 1959, when she was placed out of service and struck from the Naval Vessel Register. She was sold 18 May 1961, to Zidell Explorations, Inc., Astoria, Oregon.

== In popular culture ==
The ship can be seen in close-up in the 1958 film The Naked and the Dead about 10 minutes into the picture.

== Bibliography ==
Online resources

- "LST-1079". Dictionary of American Naval Fighting Ships. Naval History and Heritage Command. 4 August 2015. This article incorporates text from this source, which is in the public domain.
- "Payette County". Dictionary of American Naval Fighting Ships. Naval History and Heritage Command. 19 August 2015. This article incorporates text from this source, which is in the public domain.
- "Bethlehem-Hingham, Hingham MA". www.ShipbuildingHistory.com. 11 August 2011.
- "USS LST-1079". NavSource. 23 September 2016.
