= 1957 Seychellois parliamentary election =

Parliamentary elections were held in the Seychelles in June 1957. The Seychelles Taxpayers and Producers Association (STPA) won three of the four seats.

== Electoral system ==
The 13-member Legislative Council consisted of the Governor, six officials (the Government Secretary, the Attorney General, the Treasurer and the Directors of Agriculture, Education and Medical Services), two appointed members and four elected members, elected from single-member constituencies.

The right to vote was granted to all citizens over the age of 21 who could write their name, paid income tax on an annual income of SR 3,000 or more, and could prove that they had lived in the Seychelles for at least a year. Only around 10% of the population were able to register.

== Campaign ==
In two of the four seats, STPA candidates were unopposed; Helen Stevenson-Delhomme in North Mahé and Harry Savy in Praslin and La Digue.

== Results ==
Voter turnout in the contested seats was 59%.

Constituency	Elected member	Party
Central Mahé	Ernest de Coulhac-Mazerieux	Independent
North Mahé	Helen Stevenson-Delhomme	Seychelles Taxpayers and Producers Association
Praslin and La Digue	Harry Savy	Seychelles Taxpayers and Producers Association
South Mahé	Henri Gontier	Seychelles Taxpayers and Producers Association
Source: Seychelles 1957 & 1958

== Aftermath ==
Following the elections, D. Bailey and E. Stravens were appointed to the Council.
