= 1948 Seychellois parliamentary election =

Parliamentary elections were held for the first in the Seychelles in October 1948. The Seychelles Taxpayers and Producers Association (STPA), which primarily represented the interests of large landowners, won all four seats.

== Electoral system ==
Constitutional reforms led to the creation of four elected seats in the 12-member Legislative Council, with the remaining eight seats appointed by the British authorities. However, the right to vote was restricted to citizens over the age of 21 who could write their name, paid income tax on an annual income of SR 3,000 or more, and could prove that they had lived in the Seychelles for at least a year. Only around 10% of the population were able to register.

The four seats were elected from single-member constituencies; Praslin and La Digue, Central Mahé, North Mahé and South Mahé.

== Campaign ==
Only one of the four seats, Praslin and La Digue were contested, with STPA candidates running unopposed in the Mahé seats. In Praslin and La Digue STPA candidate Gustave de Comarmond was opposed by Arthur Savy, a former tennis professional and member of the Seychelles Progressive Association.

The STPA candidates campaigned on a platform of maintaining Seychellois traditions and customs, claiming they were "100 per cent Seychellois". They also called for a doctor for Anse Royale, a produce-stabilisation fund, better French language teaching in schools and reduced taxes.

== Results ==
Voter turnout in the sole contested seat was 89%.

Constituency	Elected member	Party
Central Mahé	Marcel Lemarchand	Seychelles Taxpayers and Producers Association
North Mahé	Jean-Baptiste Beauclerc Benoiton	Seychelles Taxpayers and Producers Association
Praslin and La Digue	Gustave de Comarmond	Seychelles Taxpayers and Producers Association
South Mahé	Alexandre Deltel	Seychelles Taxpayers and Producers Association
Source: Scarr
