= En Avant (anthem) =

Former anthem of Seychelles (1976-1978)

English: Forward
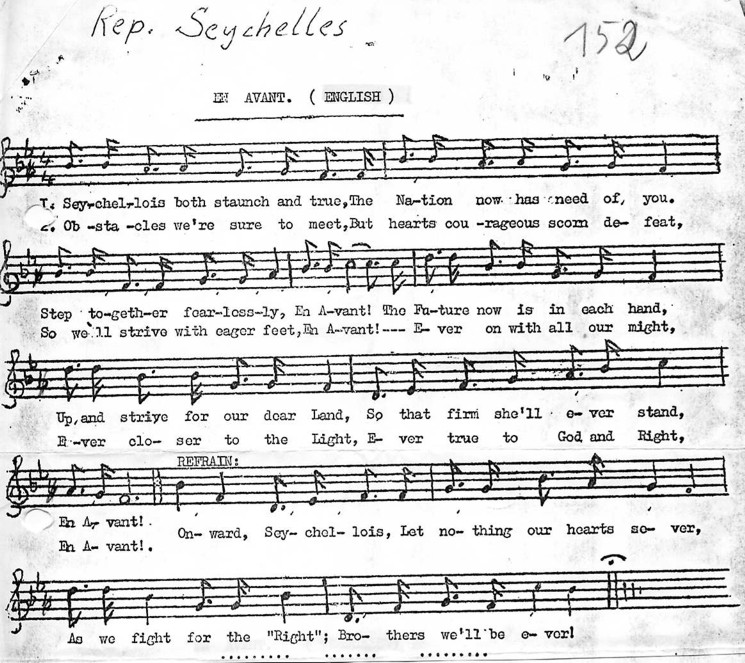
- Former national anthem of Seychelles
- Adopted: 1976
- Relinquished: 1978
- Succeeded by: "Fyer Seselwa"

"En Avant" (Forward) was the national anthem of Seychelles from 1976 until 1978.

== See also ==
- Fyer Seselwa
