= Roy Nibourette =

Seychellois politician

- Occupation: Politician
- Years active: 2007
- Title: member of the National Assembly of Seychelles

Roy Nibourette is a member of the National Assembly of Seychelles. He is a member of the Seychelles People's Progressive Front, and was first elected to the Assembly in 2007.
