= Hinduism in Seychelles =

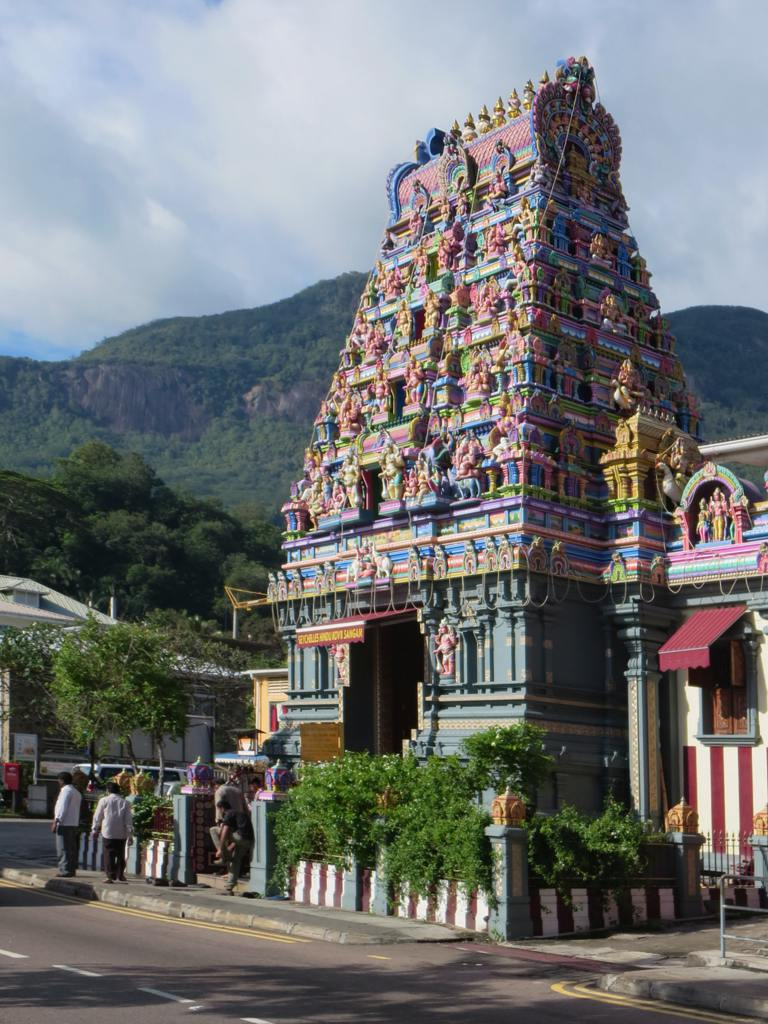
Arulmigu Navashakti Vinayakar Temple in Victoria

Hinduism in Seychelles is the second-largest religion after Christianity, with more than 5.4% of the population. The Hindu following in Seychelles has seen an increase in the community with the organization of the Seychelles Hindu Kovil Sangam and the consecration of the Navasakti Vinayagar Temple. The increase in size and popularity of Hinduism caused the Government to declare Taippoosam Kavadi Festival a holiday.

== History of Hindus in Seychelles ==
In 1901, there were 332 Hindu families out of a population of 19,237 and roughly 3,500 Tamil-speaking people.

The organization of the Seychelles Hindu Kovil Sangam in 1984 and the consecration of the Navasakti Vinayagar Temple in May 1992 were landmarks for the resurgence of Indian cultural activities apart from the religious awakening.

== Demographics ==
Historical population
| Year | Pop. | ±% |
|---|---|---|
| 1987 | 506 | — |
| 1994 | 953 | +88.3% |
| 2002 | 1,700 | +78.4% |
| 2010 | 2,174 | +27.9% |
| 2022 | 5,508 | +153.4% |

| Year | Percent | Increase |
|---|---|---|
| 1994 | 1.3% | - |
| 2002 | 2.1% | 0.8% |
| 2011 | 2.4% | 0.3% |
| 2022 | 5.4% | 3.0% |

According to the 2022 Census, there were 5,508 Hindus in Seychelles constituting 5.4% its population. This is an increase from 2,174 Hindus or 2.4 % from 2010 Census. The 2002 census reported 1,700 Hindus constituting 2.1 % of the population. In 1994, there were 953 Hindus constituting 1.3 % of the country's population.

=== Hindu population by region ===
Hindus form majority in the Outer Islands region.

| Region | Total Population | Hindu Population | Percentage of Hindus |
|---|---|---|---|
| Central | 30,145 | 1,083 | 3.6 |
| East-South | 27,072 | 2,229 | 8.2 |
| West | 15,058 | 303 | 2 |
| North | 17,843 | 797 | 4.5 |
| Praslin | 7,882 | 207 | 2.6 |
| La Digue & Inner Islands | 3,624 | 182 | 5 |
| Outer Islands | 988 | 707 | 71.6 |

=== Hindu population by districts ===
Hindus form majority in the Outer Islands districts of Assumption, Coetivy, Darros, Farquhar, Marie-Louise, Platte, Poivre, Providence, Remire and these districts are exclusively populated by Hindus. Outside the Outer Islands, significant Hindu population is found in Cascade (20%), Takamaka (9%), Saint Louis (6.3%) etc

| Region | District | Total Population | Hindu Population | Percentage of Hindus |
|---|---|---|---|---|
| Central | English River | 3,508 | 124 | 3.5 |
| Central | Mont Buxton | 2,778 | 47 | 1.7 |
| Central | Saint Louis | 3,267 | 205 | 6.3 |
| Central | Bel Air | 2,619 | 136 | 5.2 |
| Central | Mont Fleuri | 3,506 | 150 | 4.3 |
| Central | Plaisance | 3,685 | 125 | 3.4 |
| Central | Roche Caiman | 3,157 | 242 | 7.7 |
| Central | Les Mamelles | 2,215 | 41 | 1.9 |
| Central | Ile Perseverance | 5,410 | 13 | 0.2 |
| East-South | Cascade | 6,659 | 1,337 | 20.1 |
| East-South | Pointe Larue | 3,267 | 104 | 3.2 |
| East-South | Anse Aux Pins | 3,898 | 91 | 2.3 |
| East-South | Anse Royale | 4,552 | 146 | 3.2 |
| East-South | Takamaka | 3,528 | 330 | 9.4 |
| East-South | Au Cap | 5,168 | 221 | 4.3 |
| West | Baie Lazare | 4,265 | 75 | 1.8 |
| West | Anse Boileau | 4,595 | 77 | 1.7 |
| West | Grand Anse Mahé | 3,425 | 131 | 3.8 |
| West | Port Glaud | 2,773 | 20 | 0.7 |
| North | Belombre | 3,823 | 126 | 3.3 |
| North | Beau Vallon | 4,740 | 158 | 3.3 |
| North | Glacis | 3,803 | 71 | 1.9 |
| North | Anse Etoile | 5,477 | 442 | 8.1 |
| Praslin | Baie Ste Anne | 4,272 | 122 | 2.9 |
| Praslin | Grand Anse Praslin | 3,610 | 85 | 2.4 |
| La Digue & Inner Islands | Bird | 1 | 0 | 0 |
| La Digue & Inner Islands | Denis | 86 | 0 | 0 |
| La Digue & Inner Islands | Fregate | 13 | 0 | 0 |
| La Digue & Inner Islands | La Digue | 3,133 | 159 | 5.1 |
| La Digue & Inner Islands | North | 88 | 10 | 11.4 |
| La Digue & Inner Islands | Silhouette | 303 | 13 | 4.3 |
| Outer Islands | Aldabra | 3 | 0 | 0 |
| Outer Islands | Alphonse | 112 | 13 | 11.6 |
| Outer Islands | Assumption | 7 | 7 | 100 |
| Outer Islands | Coetivy | 22 | 22 | 100 |
| Outer Islands | Darros | 110 | 110 | 100 |
| Outer Islands | Desroches | 338 | 162 | 47.9 |
| Outer Islands | Farquhar | 17 | 14 | 82.4 |
| Outer Islands | Marie-Louise | 8 | 8 | 100 |
| Outer Islands | Platte | 353 | 353 | 100 |
| Outer Islands | Poivre | 9 | 9 | 100 |
| Outer Islands | Providence | 5 | 5 | 100 |
| Outer Islands | Remire | 4 | 4 | 100 |

== Seychelles Hindu Kovil Sangam ==
The Seychelles Hindu Kovil Sangam, over a short span of seventeen years, has successfully established and entrenched some strong foundations for the preservation, consolidation and further flowering of the Hindu culture. The ever-popular kavadi festival and special Hindu festivals are covered in Tamil and English in the national media and there is a wide coverage of such events over national radio and television.

== Arulmigu Navasakti Vinayagar Temple ==
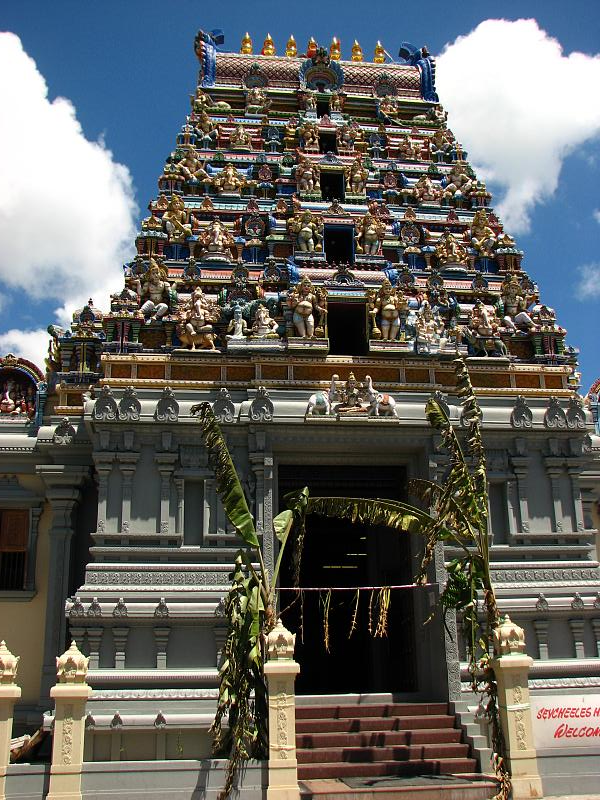
Thiru Navasakthi Vinayakar Kovil Victoria

The Arulmigu Navasakti Vinayagar Temple is the first and the only Hindu temple in Seychelles that has Ganesha as the presiding deity. Since 1999, Ganesha has been elevated to this position. Apart from the presiding deity, icons of Murugan, Nadarajah, Durga, Sreenivasa Perumal, Bhairawa and Chandekeswarar are enshrined in the inner mandapam of the temple. Prayers are performed for the different deities on special occasions.

Taippoosam Kavadi Festival, which began in Seychelles in the inner courtyard of the temple during 1993, is now conducted in the outer courtyard and a chariot kavadi is also taken out in procession. This festival has gained popularity as a national festival, so much so that as from 1998 the government has declared it a holiday for Hindus.

== Famous Seychelles Hindus ==
- Satya Naidu- first Hindu member of Seychelles National Assembly.

== See also ==
- Hinduism in Africa
