= Peter Sinon =

Seychellois politician

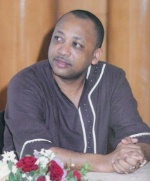

Minister for Investment, Natural Resources and Industry
- In office 2010–2015

Personal details
- Born: 30 October 1966 (age 60)
- Parent(s): Guy Sinon and Rita Sinon
- Education: University of East Anglia

Peter Andrew Guy Sinon (born 30 October 1966) is a former Seychellois Cabinet Minister who served as Minister for Investment, Natural Resources and Industry from 2010 to 2015.

The son of Ministers Guy Sinon and Rita Sinon, he graduated from the University of East Anglia, where he was a Chevening Scholar, with a 2:2 in development studies in 1990, and an MA in development economics in 1996. He previously served as Seychelles High Commissioner to South Africa and Namibia, and was an executive director at the African Development Bank where he represented Eritrea, Ethiopia, Rwanda, Seychelles, Tanzania and Uganda.
