= Satya Naidu =

First Hindu member in Seychelles National Assembly

Sathya Naidu
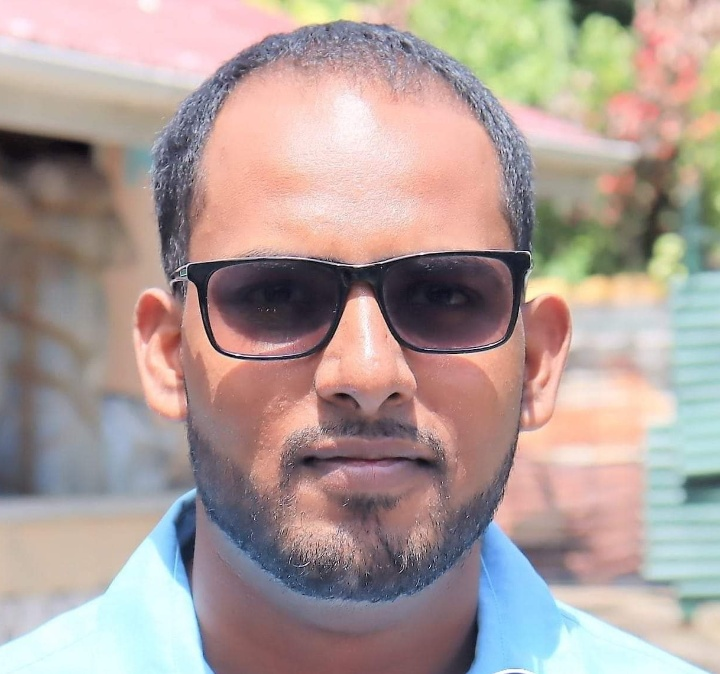

Member of National Assembly
- Incumbent
- Assumed office 26 October 2020
- Constituency: St. Louis

Personal details
- Born: 9 November 1992 (age 33) Victoria, Seychelles
- Party: Linyon Demokratik Seselwa
- Education: APIIT, Sri Lanka; Staffordshire University

Sathyanarayanan Sudarsan "Satya" Naidu (born 9 November 1992) is the first Hindu member of Seychelles National Assembly. He is also the youngest Parliamentarian of the 7th National Assembly. He was elected from the St. Louis constituency in the 2020 Seychellois parliamentary election.

== Early life ==
Naidu was born on the 9 November 1992 in Victoria, Seychelles. His family traced their origin to the Mayiladuthurai district of Tamil Nadu in India, which his grandfather left in 1917.

== Education ==
Satya studied Law in from the APIIT Law School, Sri Lanka in 2016 and then did an LLB (Hons) with the Staffordshire University in collaboration with the APIIT Law School, Sri Lanka. He is currently doing a Post-Graduate Certificate in Legal Practice with the University of Seychelles.

== Political career ==
From the age of 17, Sathya began advocating for Seychelles National Party, which later merged into the Linyon Demokratik Seselwa. According to him, it is the President Wavel Ramkalawan's fighting spirit and the love for the people that inspired him to pursue politics.

He became the Chairperson of the Seychelles National Youth Union and then became the Executive Committee Member of the Seychelles National Party from 2012 to 2014.

In the 2020 Seychellois parliamentary election, he won the St. Louis constituency after getting 60% of the votes. He is currently a Member of the Bills Committee.

On 28 March 2022, he was elected as the Executive Committee member of Linyon Demokratik Seselwa in a heavily contested election amongst other party stalwarts.

On 7 May 2022, he was elected to lead the United Cities and Local Governments of Africa’s (UCLG Africa) network of locally elected youth of Africa for the continent’s eastern region.

== See also ==
- Indo-Seychellois
