= 1979 Seychellois general election =

- 23–26 June 1979
- Presidential election
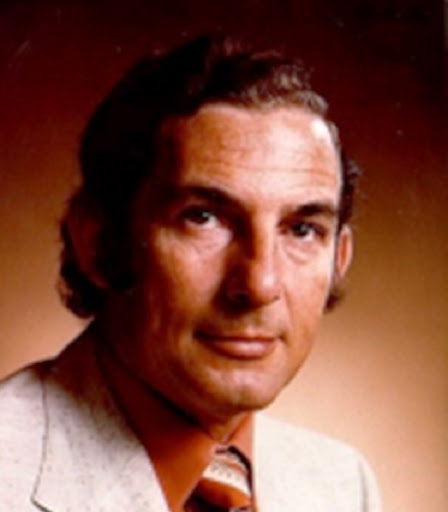
Nominee	France-Albert René
Party	FPPS
Popular vote	26,390
Percentage	97.99%
President before election
France-Albert René
FPPS
Elected President
France-Albert René
FPPS
- Parliamentary election
- 23 of the 25 seats in the National Assembly
Party	Leader	Seats	+/–
FPPS	France-Albert René	23	+21
This lists parties that won seats. See the complete results below.
Results by district

General elections were held in the Seychelles between 23 and 26 June 1979 to elect a President and People's Assembly. Following a coup in 1977, the Seychelles People's Progressive Front (previously the Seychelles People's United Party) was the sole legal party at the time. The only candidate in the presidential election was SPUP leader France-Albert René.

The SPUP won all 23 elected seats in the National Assembly and René's candidacy was approved by 98% of voters with a voter turnout of 96%.

== Results ==
=== President ===
Candidate	Party	Votes	%
France-Albert René	Seychelles People's Progressive Front	26,390	97.99
Against		541	2.01
Total		26,931	100.00
Registered voters/turnout		27,929	–
Source: EISA

=== National Assembly ===
Party	Seats
Seychelles People's Progressive Front	23
Presidential appointees	2
Total	25
Source: IPU
