= 1984 Seychellois presidential election =

- 17 June 1984
- Registered: 37,012
- Turnout: 95.91%
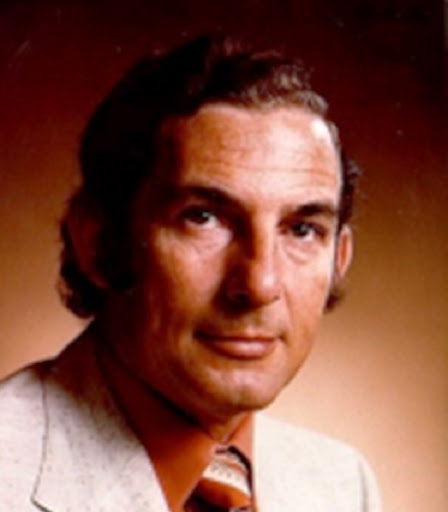
Nominee	France-Albert René
Party	FPPS
Popular vote	35,499
Percentage	92.72%
President before election
France-Albert René
FPPS
Elected President
France-Albert René
FPPS

Presidential elections were held in the Seychelles on 17 June 1984. Following a coup in 1977, the Seychelles People's Progressive Front was the sole legal party, and its leader, France-Albert René, was the only candidate in the election. He was re-elected with 92.6% of the votes on a 95.9% turnout.

== Results ==
Candidate	Party	Votes	%
France-Albert René	Seychelles People's Progressive Front	32,883	92.72
Against		2,582	7.28
Total		35,465	100.00
Valid votes		35,465	99.90
Invalid/blank votes		34	0.10
Total votes		35,499	100.00
Registered voters/turnout		37,012	95.91
Source: EISA
