= Guy Sinon =

Seychellois politician (1933–1992)

Guy Simon
- Born: 1933
- Died: 1992 (aged 58–59)
- Citizenship: Seychellois
- Occupation: Politician

Guy Sinon (1933 – 1992) was a Seychellois politician who served as Minister for Foreign Affairs from 1977 to 1979. He also served as Minister for Education and Minister for Administration and Political Affairs.

His sister Marie-Pierre Lloyd, wife Rita Sinon, and son Peter Sinon have also served in the Cabinet of Seychelles.
