= 2007 Seychellois parliamentary election =

Legislative election held in the Seychelles

Results by constituency

Parliamentary elections were held in Seychelles between 10 and 12 May 2007. The result was a landslide victory for the ruling Seychelles People's Progressive Front, which retained all 23 of its seats in the 34-seat National Assembly.

== Results ==
Party	Votes	%	Seats			
Party	Votes	%	FPTP	PR	Total	+/–
Seychelles People's Progressive Front	30,571	56.16	18	5	23	0
SNP–SDP	23,869	43.84	7	4	11	0
Total	54,440	100.00	25	9	34	0
Valid votes	54,434	97.50				
Invalid/blank votes	1,393	2.50				
Total votes	55,827	100.00				
Registered voters/turnout	64,993	85.90				
Source: African Elections Database (Note: In the official results, the reported number of valid votes (54,434) was six fewer that the total of votes cast for each party (54,440).)
