= United Seychelles =

Political party in Seychelles

- Abbreviation: US
- Leader: Patrick Herminie
- Founder: France-Albert René
- Founded: 2 June 1964
- Newspaper: The People
- Women's wing: United Seychelles Women's League
- Ideology: Social democracy Democratic socialism 1977–1991: Socialism (Note: Following the coup, René declared that he was not a Soviet-style Communist, but an "Indian Ocean socialist" and "socialist pan-Africanist", generally oriented towards Tanzanian president Julius Nyerere and his African socialism.)
- Political position: Centre-left to left-wing
- Colours: Red
- National Assembly: 19 / 34 (56%)

Website
- unitedseychelles.net

Old party flag

United Seychelles is a political party in Seychelles. It publishes a newspaper called The People. It was known as the Seychelles People's Progressive Front (French: Front Progressiste du Peuple Seychellois, Seychellois Creole: Fron Progresis Pep Sesel) from 1978/9 to June 2009, when it changed its name to the People's Party (Seychellois Creole: Parti Lepep, PL). The party changed its name again in November 2018, from the People's Party to United Seychelles.

The party was founded in 1964 by France-Albert René, under the name Seychelles People's United Party, and it was led by him from its inception. The party was the ruling party from 1977 to 2020 and was the sole legal party in the country from 1979 to 1991 (this period is referred to retrospectively as the "Second Republic"). The party is led by a Central Executive Committee.

Leading members of the party over the years have been René, James Michel (formerly the chief of staff of the armed forces, information minister, finance minister and vice-president from 1996 to 2004; he was the President of Seychelles from 2004 to 2016), Guy Sinon, Jacques Hodoul (a former foreign minister who was regarded as the party's chief ideologue), Joseph Belmont (former Vice-president of Seychelles), and Maxime Ferrari (a former René loyalist who later supported the opposition and wrote an autobiography).

Former Vice-president of Seychelles Vincent Meriton has been the leader of the party since June 2017 (party president). He is the third president of the party since its creation in 1964. Meriton was preceded by former President of Seychelles James Michel.

The party maintains branches in each electoral district and uses an extensive system of patronage. At the parliamentary election in 2011, the party won 88.56% of the popular vote and all 31 seats in the National Assembly. That fell to 49.22% and 14 seats in the national assembly after the parliamentary election in 2016, leaving the party in parliamentary opposition for the first time. From 1993 (when opposition parties were legalised) to 2011, candidates from the party won all the presidential elections in the first round, while in 2016 they won in the second round, and in 2020 they lost for the first time. The party also held a majority in the National Assembly independence until 2016. Seychelles opposition candidate Wavel Ramkalawan won in the 2020 Seychellois general election with 54.9 per cent of valid votes cast, upsetting incumbent President Danny Faure of United Seychelles. The party lost its first presidential poll in over 40 years since Seychelles gained independence. United Seychellois lost also in the General Assembly elections and Linyon Demokratik Seselwa (LDS) held its clear majority in the parliament.

After Vincent Meriton stepped down as party leader, Patrick Herminie was elected as the new leader in 2021. In October 2023, Herminie was charged by the Seychellois public prosecutor with witchcraft. He denied the charges and described them as politically motivated. In February 2024, the witchcraft accusations were lifted by the Victoria public prosecutor's office. In October 2025, presidential runoff was won by Patrick Herminie, meaning United Seychelles (US) returned to power. United Seychelles won 15 out of 26 seats in the parliament. On 26 October 2025, Patrick Herminie was sworn in as Seychelles’ sixth president.

== Election results ==
=== Presidential elections ===
Election	Party candidate	Votes	%	Votes	%	Result
Election	Party candidate	First round		Second round		Result
1979	France-Albert René	26,390	98%	–	–	Elected ✓
1984	France-Albert René	32,883	92.6%	–	–	Elected ✓
1989	France-Albert René	37,703	96.1%	–	–	Elected ✓
1993	France-Albert René	25,627	59.5%	–	–	Elected ✓
1998	France-Albert René	31,048	66.7%	–	–	Elected ✓
2001	France-Albert René	27,223	54.2%	–	–	Elected ✓
2006	James Michel	30,119	53.73%	–	–	Elected ✓
2011	James Michel	31,966	55.46%	–	–	Elected ✓
2015	James Michel	28,911	47.76%	31,512	50.15%	Elected ✓
2020	Danny Faure	28,178	43.51%	–	–	Lost ✗
2025	Patrick Herminie	30,736	48.83%	34,389	52.73%	Elected ✓

=== National Assembly elections ===
Election	Party leader	Votes	%	Seats	+/–	Position	Result
1967	France-Albert René	8,621	48.2%	3 / 8	▲3	▲2nd	Opposition
1970	France-Albert René	15,834	44.1%	5 / 15	▲2	2nd	Opposition
1974	France-Albert René	19,920	47.63%	2 / 15	▼3	2nd	Opposition
1979	France-Albert René		98%	23 / 25	▲21	▲1st	Sole legal party
1983	France-Albert René	20,705	100%	23 / 25	Steady	1st	Sole legal party
1987	France-Albert René	28,410	100%	23 / 25	Steady	1st	Sole legal party
1992	France-Albert René	24,538	58.4%	14 / 22	▼9	1st	Majority government
1993	France-Albert René	24,462	56.6%	27 / 33	▲13	1st	Supermajority government
1998	France-Albert René	28,610	61.7%	30 / 34	▲3	1st	Supermajority government
2002	France-Albert René	28,075	54.27%	23 / 34	▼7	1st	Supermajority government
2007	James Michel	30,571	56.76%	23 / 34	Steady	1st	Supermajority government
2011	James Michel	31,123	88.56%	33 / 34	▲10	1st	Supermajority government
2016	James Michel	30,218	49.22%	14 / 33	▼19	▼2nd	Minority government
2020	Vincent Meriton	27,185	42.35%	10 / 35	▼4	2nd	Opposition
2025	Patrick Herminie	30,880	49.14%	19 / 34	▲9	▲1st	Majority government

== Former logos ==
Logo of the SPUP from 1964 until 1991.

Logo of the People's Party (Parti Lepep)

== Notable people ==
- Joevana Charles
- Ansley Constance
- Charles DeCommarmond
- Ginette Gamatis
- Wilby Lucas
- Marc Naiken
- Roy Nibourette
- David Payet
- Marie-Antoinette Rose
- Vicky Theresine
- Jennifer Vel
- Marc Volcere
