= 1977 Seychelles coup d'état =

Political coup in the Seychelles

- Part of the Cold War
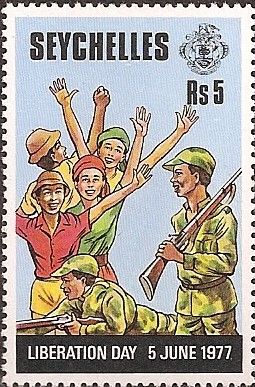
- A 1978 post stamp commemorating the anniversary of the 1977 coup, called "Liberation Day"
Date	4–5 June 1977
Location	Victoria, Mahé, Seychelles 4°37′S 55°27′E
Result	Coup attempt succeeds.: Sir James Mancham is overthrown.; France-Albert René is installed as the new President.

Belligerents
SDP–led Government: Seychelles Police Force	SPUP–affiliated insurgents Supported by: Tanzania

Commanders and leaders
Sir James Mancham	France-Albert René

Strength
	60–200

Casualties and losses
1	1
- Nexus of coup in Victoria (marked green), Seychelles

The 1977 Seychelles coup d'état was a coup that occurred in the East African and Indian Ocean country of Seychelles on 4–5 June 1977. Between 60–200 supporters of the Seychelles People's United Party (SPUP), who had been training in Tanzania, overthrew President Sir James Mancham of the Seychelles Democratic Party (SDP) while he was attending the Commonwealth Heads of Government Meeting in London, the United Kingdom.

== The coup ==
The insurgents took control of strategic points on the main island of Mahé, where the capital Victoria is located. The central police station was seized "virtually without a shot being fired." In contrast, there was an exchange of fire at the Mont Fleuri police station, where the arsenal was kept. A policeman and one of the insurgents were killed in the fighting.

The plotters arrested six British Armed Forces officers, who had been advising the Seychelles Police Force since 1976, when Seychelles gained independence from the United Kingdom. The officers and their families, as well as the Chief Justice of the Supreme Court, Aiden O'Brien Quinn, a judge from Ireland similarly on loan by his Government, were flown to Europe.

== Aftermath ==
The leader of the SPUP and Prime Minister France-Albert René, who denied knowing of the plan, was then sworn in as President and formed a new government.

When approached by the insurgents, René was said to have accepted the Presidency on three conditions: that the safety of political individuals be guaranteed, that international agreements remain in force (including the one allowing the United States to maintain an AFSCF space tracking station in Mahé), and that elections be planned for 1978 (they were eventually held in 1979).

A Proclamation by the coup leaders on 13 June 1977, suspended the Constitution and gave the power to make laws by decree to René. Another Proclamation on 28 June 1977, revoked the Constitution and replaced it with one that eliminated the parliament and transferred all legislative powers to the President. This extra-constitutional regime formulated another Constitution in 1979.

René was the only presidential candidate for elections in 1979, in 1984, and in 1989, which he won with over 90% of the vote.

== See also ==
- History of Seychelles
- 1981 Seychelles coup d'état attempt
