= France-Albert René =

President of Seychelles from 1977 to 2004

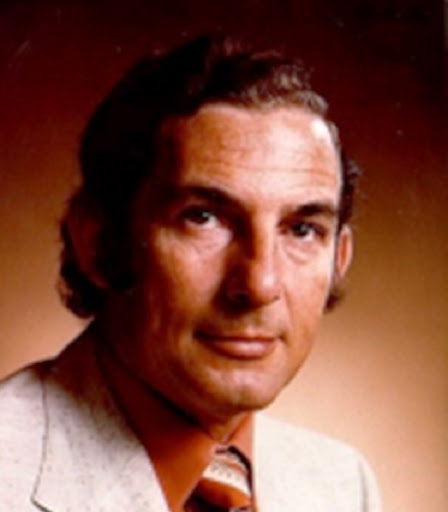
- Official portrait, c. 1970s

2nd President of Seychelles
- In office 5 June 1977 – 14 July 2004
- Vice President: None (1977–1996); James Michel (1996–2004)
- Preceded by: James Mancham
- Succeeded by: James Michel

2nd Prime Minister of Seychelles
- In office 29 June 1976 – 5 June 1977
- President: James Mancham
- Preceded by: James Mancham

Personal details
- Born: 16 November 1935 Victoria, Colony of Seychelles
- Died: 27 February 2019 (aged 83) Mahé, Seychelles
- Party: Seychelles People's Progressive Front
- Spouses: Karen Handley (m. 1956, divorced) Geva Adam (m. 1975; div. 1992) Sarah Zarquani (m. 1993)
- Children: 4 daughters
- Education: King's College London
- Profession: Politician; lawyer

France-Albert René (French: [fʁɑ̃s albɛʁ ʁəne]; 16 November 1935 – 27 February 2019) was a Seychellois lawyer, politician and revolutionary who served as the second President of Seychelles from 1977 to 2004, following a coup d'état that ousted the country's founding president James Mancham. He previously served as the nation’s second and final Prime Minister, from independence in 1976 until the abolition of the post in 1977. He was a leading figure of the Seychelles People’s Progressive Front, later known as United Seychelles.

== Early life ==
France-Albert René was born to Price René, a plantation manager and administrator, and Luisa Morgan René, a seamstress, on 16 November 1935 in Victoria, on the island of Mahé, Crown Colony of Seychelles. He spent his early childhood in Farquhar Atoll before returning to the city at the age of five. There, he attended St Joseph's Convent and later Saint Louis College. At the age of 17, René was awarded a scholarship to study theology at the Capuchin Seminary of St. Maurice in Valais, Switzerland. After his first year, he transferred to St Mary's College, Southampton, England, to study law. In 1957, he graduated from King's College London and joined Middle Temple, where he remained for four years as a barrister.

While abroad, René became involved in the politics of the Labour Party, then led by Clement Attlee and later by Hugh Gaitskell. These experiences led him to adopt a moderate socialist ideology, favouring some state intervention in the economy alongside strong ties with conservative institutions such as the Roman Catholic Church - his initial ambition had been to enter the priesthood. Later in his career, however, René openly criticised local church leaders who opposed his policies. From 1962 to 1964, he studied economics at the London School of Economics.

On returning to his homeland in 1964, René began practising law in Victoria. Disillusioned by the social injustices perpetuated under British colonial rule, he decided to participate in Seychelles’ political development. Around this time, he also launched his own newspaper, The People.

=== Politics ===
In 1964, the Seychelles People's United Party (SPUP), the forerunner to the United Seychelles (US), was formed. Led by René, a founding member, they campaigned for socialism and independence from Britain. The same year, James Mancham created the Seychelles Democratic Party (SDP), which, in contrast, represented conservatives, businessmen, and planters, and wanted closer integration with Britain. After being elected to the legislative assembly of the colony in 1965, he actively fought for self-government and then independence. Elections were held in 1966, and the SDP won. In 1970, Seychelles gained a new constitution, universal adult suffrage, and a governing council with an elected majority.

In March 1970, colonial authorities and Seychellois leaders convened in London for a constitutional conference. The SDP pressed for closer ties with Britain, while the SPUP demanded full independence. A new constitution came into effect following the November 1970 elections, with Mancham as Chief Minister. In 1975, he became Minister of Public Works and Land Development of the coalition government. Negotiations with Britain led to independence on 29 June 1976, when Seychelles became a republic within the Commonwealth. The newly knighted Sir James Mancham was sworn in as the first President, with René as Prime Minister. The islands of Aldabra, Farquhar, and Desroches, which had been previously transferred to form the British Indian Ocean Territory in 1965, were restored to Seychelles.

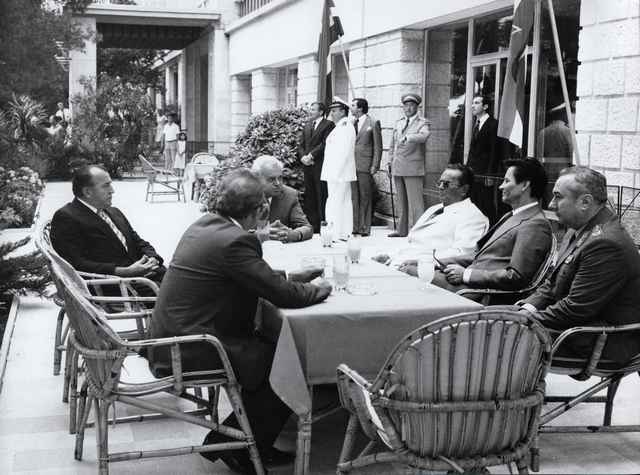
Yugoslav delegation waiting for Seychellois President René on Brijuni Islands, SR Croatia, 1979

=== 1977 coup ===
Relations between Mancham and René were often tense. On one occasion, when the former confronted him about practising with rifles on an uninhabited island, René replied that he had been “shooting rabbits” and had a brace sent to the president’s office.

On 4 June 1977, less than a year after independence, Mancham travelled abroad to attend the Commonwealth Heads of Government Meeting in London and to celebrate the Silver Jubilee of Queen Elizabeth II. In his absence, between 60 and 200 Tanzanian-trained supporters of René staged a coup d’état and seized control of strategic sites on Mahé. While the central police station was seized "virtually without a shot being fired", there was an exchange of fire at the Mont Fleuri police station, where the arsenal was stored. Three men, a policeman, and one of the insurgents were killed in the crossfire. Six British Armed Forces officers, who had been advising the Seychelles Police Force since 1976, were arrested by the insurgents. They, along with their families and Chief Justice Aiden O'Brien Quinn, an Irish judge on secondment, were later deported to Europe.

René reportedly agreed to assume the presidency on three conditions: a guarantee of the safety of political individuals involved, respect for international agreements, and elections in 1978 (which were eventually held in 1979). He, however, denied prior knowledge of the coup. In 2019 and 2020, this was challenged during hearings at the Truth, Reconciliation and National Unity Commission, when a known participant acknowledged his involvement in planning and executing the same.

On 5 June 1977, René was sworn in as president and formed a new government. After coming to power, he declared that he was not a Soviet-style Communist, but rather an "Indian Ocean socialist" and "socialist pan-Africanist", generally oriented towards Tanzanian president Julius Nyerere and his African socialism. He opposed the Anglo-American military base on Diego Garcia due to concerns over nuclear weapons and sought to reduce the country's dependence on tourism, declaring that he wished "to keep the Seychelles for the Seychellois".

== Socialist rule ==
=== Domestic policies ===
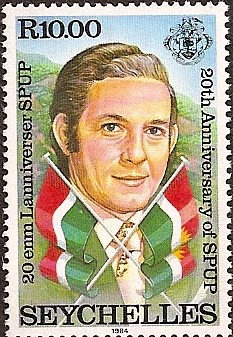
René on a postage stamp commemorating the 20th anniversary of SPUP, 1984

René's party, renamed the Seychelles People's Progressive Front (SPPF) in 1978, was the only legal party in the country from 1979 to 1991, and was largely financed by Tanzania, Algeria, Libya, and East Germany. The reformed one-party socialist state system featured a directly elected president alongside the existing plurality voting system for legislative representation. In practice, however, all political activity took place under the SPPF’s authority. Citizens aged seventeen and above could vote in presidential elections, but only on a yes-no basis. The president wielded near-absolute executive power and appointed both his cabinet and the chair of the National Assembly. The legislature operated without independence, merely enacting bills introduced by the executive. Open criticism of René or his government was not tolerated.

This system ensured René’s uncontested victories in the presidential elections of 1979, 1984, and 1989, each with over 90% of the vote. Multiparty democracy was reintroduced in 1993, but René continued to dominate, defeating opposition leader Wavel Ramkalawan of the Seychelles National Party in 1993, 1998, and 2001. In addition to the presidency, René simultaneously held several cabinet portfolios, including Minister of Foreign Affairs, Minister of Interior and Defence, Minister of Finance, Minister of Finance and Industry, Minister of Planning and External Relations, Minister of Tourism, and Minister of Industry. From 1978 to 1984, he served as chairman of the SPPF, before becoming its Secretary General in June 1984. In 1979, a planned invasion by supporters of former president Mancham, allegedly with assistance from American diplomatic staff in Kenya and Seychelles, was uncovered before it could be carried out. An official inquiry also implicated France in the attempted coup.

Despite its authoritarianism, the SPPF introduced wide-ranging reforms benefitting its citizens, including universal access to healthcare and education. The Seychelles scored well in terms of child mortality, literacy rate, median income, and standard of living, compared to most of Africa, before ultimately ranking as the continent’s most developed country on the Human Development Index. Domestic policies aimed at racial equity also improved conditions for the majority of Seychellois Creole people. The white minority, particularly Franco-Seychellois, however, continued to occupy most senior government and party positions. Like his predecessor, Mancham, René relied heavily on tourism as an economic driver. To finance ambitious social programs, he promoted the settlement of international banks and established an offshore financial sector. Despite occasional coup attempts, his regime was relatively stable due to his ability to balance socialist and capitalist interests.

=== Foreign policy ===
Diplomatic relations between Seychelles and the People’s Republic of China were formally established on 30 June 1976. Beginning in 1977, China provided diplomatic and developmental aid, including the construction of a polytechnic school and a housing project in Les Mamelles. By 2002, China was exporting goods worth US$1.48 million to Seychelles while importing only about US$100,000 in return.

India has maintained diplomatic ties with Seychelles since its independence in 1976. A resident Indian high commissioner has been stationed in Victoria since 1987, while Seychelles opened its resident mission in New Delhi in 2008. Relations have consistently been warm, marked by regular high-level visits. From India, Prime Minister Indira Gandhi and Presidents R. Venkataraman and Pratibha Patil all visited Seychelles, while Seychellois presidents René, James Michel, and Danny Faure have made state visits to India.

Under René's leadership, Seychelles also pursued stronger economic ties with Southeast Asia. In 1986, it imported roughly US$600,000 worth of Malaysian goods directly, but purchased a much larger US$7 million through indirect trade via Singapore. Seeking to bypass Singaporean ports, Seychelles aimed for direct trade links with Malaysia. In 1988, the two countries signed an agreement to promote cooperation in culture, education, sports, and information.

They have maintained close relations with the Democratic People’s Republic of Korea, which has provided significant developmental aid. In 1983, fifty-five instructors and interpreters were deployed to assist its armed forces. René visited Pyongyang several times, meeting with Kim Il Sung. During a 1988 visit, he expressed support for Korean reunification and endorsed the idea of a Democratic Confederal Republic of Koryo. That visit concluded with the signing of a treaty on economic cooperation.

Seychelles established relations with the Soviet Union the day after gaining independence. On 15 February 1980, the two states signed the Agreement on Merchant Navigation in Victoria. They also publicly supported the Soviet invasion of Afghanistan. In 1987, The Sunday Times, citing unnamed US intelligence officials, reported that fifty Soviet naval infantry troops had landed in Seychelles in October 1986 aboard the Ivan Rogov, one month after a failed assassination attempt against René. In 1999, the two countries concluded an agreement on tourism.

Finally, the United States established an official presence in Seychelles in 1963 with the construction of a US Air Force Tracking Station on Mahé on leased land at a cost of US$4.5 million annually. The facility employed five US Air Force personnel (two officers and three sergeants), 65 staff from Loral Corporation and Johnson Instruments, and 150 Seychellois workers, and remained operational until 30 September 1996. Peace Corps Volunteers also served in Seychelles from 1974 to 1995. A US consulate was first opened in May 1976 and upgraded to an embassy following independence in June 1976. The embassy closed in August 1996, after which a consular agency, under the supervision of the US Embassy in Port Louis, Mauritius, was established on 2 September 1996.

=== Coups d'état ===
Numerous coup attempts were mounted against René’s government during the 1980s, with three in the first two and a half years alone, and further attempts in 1986 and 1987. On 25 November 1981, Seychellois security forces foiled a coup sponsored by South Africa. A group of 43 mercenaries, led by the infamous British Colonel Mike Hoare, entered the country disguised as tourists who were members of the defunct charitable fraternity, the Ancient Order of Froth Blowers. Shortly after disembarking from a Royal Swazi National Airways aircraft, an airport guard discovered a Kalashnikov rifle in their luggage, sparking a gun battle during which hostages were taken. Most of the mercenaries ultimately escaped by hijacking an Air India plane waiting on the runway.

While an independent United Nations inquiry confirmed that South African intelligence orchestrated the operation, Hoare recalled receiving what he described as an “extremely timid” response from a CIA officer in Pretoria. The author John Perkins, however, has suggested that the coup formed part of a covert effort to reinstall the pro-American former president, due to concerns about the United States’ access to its Diego Garcia military base. South Africa eventually paid René’s government US$3 million for the return of the captured mercenaries.

The government again came under threat in August 1982, when the army staged a mutiny. The rebellion lasted two days before loyalist troops, supported by Tanzanian forces and several mercenaries who had escaped earlier imprisonment, recaptured rebel-held installations.

In 1986, Defence Minister Ogilvy Berlouis led an attempted coup. In response, René requested Indian assistance, prompting Operation Flowers are Blooming, in which the INS Vindhyagiri arrived in Port Victoria, to help avert the crisis. India also intervened again later that year, when Prime Minister Rajiv Gandhi lent René his aircraft to return quickly from an international meeting in Harare after another suspected coup attempt by Berlouis. He also reportedly sought refuge at the Indian High Commissioner’s residence in Malé.

In February 1992, local accountant and landowner Conrad Greslé, a vocal advocate of multiparty democracy, was arrested and charged with treason for allegedly conspiring with foreign mercenaries and the CIA to overthrow the regime.

== Democracy ==
Faced with growing pressure from Seychelles' principal foreign aid donors, René's administration began moving toward democratic reform in the early 1990s. Following the collapse of the Berlin Wall and dissolution of the Soviet Union, he announced the restoration of multiparty democracy after nearly sixteen years of one-party rule. On 27 December 1991, the Constitution was amended to allow the registration of political parties. Among the returning exiles was James Mancham, who came back in April 1992 to revive the SDP. By the end of that month, eight political parties had registered to contest the first step in the transition process: elections to the constitutional commission, held from 23 to 26 July 1992.

The Constitutional Commission, comprising 22 elected members, commenced work on 27 August 1992. Both René and Mancham appealed for reconciliation and consensus on a democratic constitution. The first draft failed to secure the required 60% approval. An amended version, however, was approved on 7 May 1993 and subsequently endorsed in a second referendum held from 15 to 18 June 1993, where 73.9% of voters approved the text. The first multiparty presidential and legislative elections since 1974 were held under the new constitution from 23 to 26 July that year. René secured a decisive victory, defeating both the SDP and the United Opposition (UO), a coalition of three smaller parties. International observers and all contesting parties declared the elections “free and fair”.

The next presidential election, held from 20 to 22 March 1998, was contested by René, Mancham, and Wavel Ramkalawan. René won by a landslide, increasing his vote share to 66.6%. In the National Assembly elections that year, the SPPF garnered 61.7% of the vote. In 2002, after gaining 42% the centrist liberal Seychelles National Party (SNP), became the principal opposition party, as the SPPF fell to 54%.

== Resignation and later life ==
On 24 February 2004, René announced that he would be stepping down. He formally relinquished the presidency on 14 July, but remained leader of the SPPF, which honoured him as its patron and founder. Although many believed René continued to wield influence after leaving office, his political power gradually waned. By 2016, the SPPF lost parliamentary control to the opposition. His family members later suggested that his successor, James Michel, distanced himself from René after consolidating power, rarely consulting him except during election campaigns, when René’s public support was solicited. In 2014, René endorsed a biography by the British historian Kevin Shillington titled “Albert René – The Father of the Modern Seychelles”, which chronicled his early political life and his fight against colonialism.

René died of respiratory failure on 27 February 2019 at the age of 83, following hospitalisation earlier that month for respiratory complications. The former president had been admitted to hospital with an undisclosed illness for respiratory problems on 12 February. His passing prompted tributes from around the world. Seychellois politician Dolor Ernesta described him as “a true leader who led the fight for independence” and praised his vision for national development. Chinese President Xi Jinping also conveyed condolences, noting René’s contributions to fostering China–Seychelles friendship.

== Personal life and marriages ==
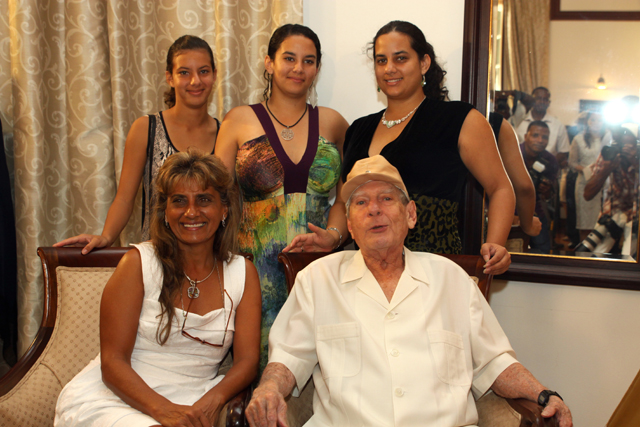
René with his wife Sarah Zarqani and their three daughters in 2014

René got married three times during his life. His first marriage, in 1956, was to Karen Handley, with whom he had a daughter. The couple later divorced. When asked about the 1977 coup, she stated that, “[he] plotted his communist revolution from my semi in Luton.”

In 1975, he married Geva Adam, an educator and widow. Though they had no children together, René regarded Geva’s three sons, David, Glenny, and Francis, as his own. Geva served as Seychelles’ inaugural First Lady of Seychelles from 1977 until the couple’s divorce in 1992, which was finalized in April 1993.

Within two months, René married his third wife; Sarah Zarqani, who was 25 years his junior, had recently returned after leaving Seychelles in 1990 upon conceiving the couple’s first child during an extramarital affair. Together, they had three daughters and remained married until his death in 2019.

René had numerous extramarital affairs and mistresses throughout his life, which he dismissed as him “[having] always made a hobby out of fishing.”

== Legacy ==
René was often described as a prime example of a benevolent dictator.

Political offices
Preceded by Sir James Mancham	Prime Minister of Seychelles; 1976–1977	Succeeded by post abolished
Preceded by Sir James Mancham	President of Seychelles; 1977–2004	Succeeded by James Michel
