= Cabinet of Seychelles =

Seychelles government

The Cabinet of Seychelles consists of the President, Vice-president and the Ministers. It formulates the government's policies and advises the President.

== Current Cabinet ==
Party key	United Seychelles
Party key	Linyon Demokratik Seselwa

Cabinet of Seychelles: October 2025 –
Portrait	Portfolio	Incumbent
	President; Defence; Legal Affairs; Public Administration; Prevention of Drug Abuse and Rehabilitation; Mental Health Care	Patrick Herminie
	Vice President; Information Communication Technology; Digital Transformation; Information; Lands and Housing; Seychelles Infrastructure Agency; Poverty Alleviation; Risk and Disaster Management	Sebastien Pillay
	Minister of Finance, Economic Planning and Trade	Pierre Laporte
	Minister of Health; Policy, Planning & Regulation	Marvin Fanny
	Minister of Employment and & Human Resource Planning; Labour Relations and Regulations	Idith Alexander
	Minister of Homeland Security and Civil Affairs	James Camille
	Minister of Education and Human Resource Development; Educational Support and Project	David Pierre
	Minister of Transport Port and Civil Aviation	Veronique Laporte
	Minister for Local Government and Inner Islands	Eveline Rose
	Minister of Youth and Sports	Kalsey Belle
	Minister of Fisheries; Blue Economy	Wallace Cosgrow
	Minister of Foreign Affairs and Diaspora	Barry Faure
	Minister of Social Affairs, Family and Equality	Pamela Charlette
	Minister of Environment, Climate, Energy and Natural Resources	Marie-May Jeremie
	Minister of Industry and Enterprise	Geralda Desaubin
	Minister of Tourism and Culture	Amanda Bernstein

== October 2020 cabinet ==
Party key	United Seychelles
Party key	Linyon Demokratik Seselwa

Cabinet of Seychelles: October 2020 – October 2025
Portrait	Portfolio	Incumbent
	President; Defence; Legal Affairs; Public Administration; National Planning; National Security	Wavel Ramkalawan
	Vice President; Information Communication Technology; Information	Ahmed Afif
	Minister of Finance, Economic Planning and Trade	Naadir Hassan
	Minister of Health	Peggy Vidot
	Minister of Employment and Social Affairs	Patricia Francourt
	Minister of Home Affairs	Errol Fonseka
	Minister of Education	Justin Valentin
	Minister of Agriculture, Climate Change and Environment	Flavien Joubert
	Minister of Transport	Antony Derjacques
	Minister for Local Government and Community Development	Rose-Marie Hoareau
	Minister of Investment, Entrepreneurship and Industry	Devika Vidot
	Minister of Youth, Sports and Family Affairs	Marie-Celine Zialor
	Designated Minister / Minister of Fisheries	Jean-François Ferrari
	Minister of Land Use and Housing	Billy Rangasamy
	Minister of Foreign Affairs and Tourism	Sylvestre Radegonde

== April 2018 Cabinet ==
Party key	People's Party
Party key	Linyon Demokratik Seselwa

Cabinet of Seychelles: April 2018 - October 2020
Portrait	Portfolio	Incumbent
	President; Foreign Affairs; Public Administration; Legal Affairs; Defense	Danny Faure
	Vice President of Seychelles; Information, Blue Economy; Investment and Industry, Information Communication Technology, Information, and The Blue Economy; Industry & Entrepreneurship Development	Vincent Mériton
	Minister of Health and Social Affairs	Jean-Paul Adam
	Minister of Family Affairs	Mitcy Larue
	Minister of Agriculture and Fisheries	Charles Bastienne
	Minister of Employment, Immigration and Civil Status	Myriam Telemaque
	Minister of Environment, Energy & Climate Change	Wallace Cosgrow
	Minister of Habitat, Lands, Infrastructure and Land Transport	Pamela Charlette
	Minister of Finance, Trade and Economic Planning	Maurice Loustau-Lalanne
	Minister of Tourism, Civil Aviation, Ports and Marine	Didier Dogley
	Minister of Education and Human Resources Development	Jeanne Siméon
	Designated Minister and Ministry of Local Government and Home Affairs; Youth, Sports and Culture; Disaster Management	Macsuzy Mondon

== July 2017 Cabinet ==
Cabinet of Seychelles: July 2017 - April 2018
Portrait	Portfolio	Incumbent
	President; Foreign Affairs; Public Administration; Legal Affairs; Defense	Danny Faure
	Vice President of Seychelles; Information, Blue Economy; Investment and Industry, Information, Communications and Technology (ICT); Risk and Disaster Management	Vincent Mériton
	Minister of Health and Social Affairs	Jean-Paul Adam
	Minister of Finance, Trade and Economic Planning	Peter Larose
	Minister of Youth, Sports and Culture	Mitcy Larue
	Minister of Habitat, Infrastructure and Land Transport	Charles Bastienne
	Minister of Employment, Immigration and Civil Status	Myriam Telemaque
	Minister of Industry, Entrepreneurship Development and Business Innovation	Wallace Cosgrow
	Minister of Agriculture and Fisheries	Pamela Charlette
	Minister of Tourism, Civil Aviation, Ports and Marine	Maurice Loustau-Lalanne
	Minister of Environment, Energy & Climate Change	Didier Dogley
	Minister of Education and Human Resources Development	Joël Morgan
	Minister of Family Affairs	Jeanne Siméon
	Designated Minister and Ministry of Local Government and Home Affairs	Macsuzy Mondon

== 2016 Cabinet ==
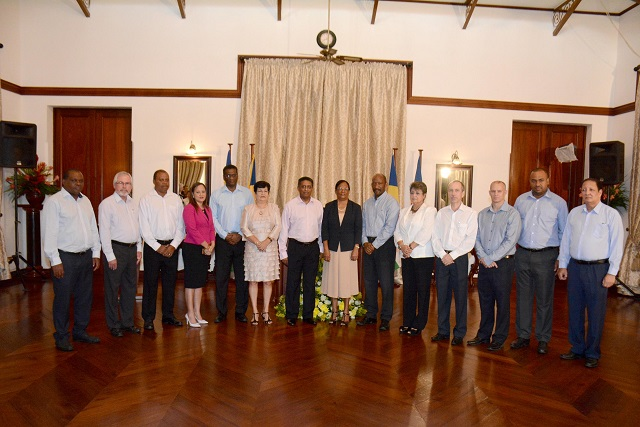
Seychelles Cabinet, March 2017

Party key	People's Party
Party key	Linyon Demokratik Seselwa

Cabinet of Seychelles: October 2016 – July 2017
Portrait	Portfolio	Incumbent
	President; Foreign Affairs; Public Administration; Legal Affairs; Defense	Danny Faure
	Vice President of Seychelles; Information, Blue Economy; Investment and Industry, Information, Communications and Technology (ICT); Risk and Disaster Management	Vincent Mériton
	Minister of Health and Social Affairs	Jean-Paul Adam
	Minister of Finance, Trade and Economic Planning	Peter Larose
	Minister of Internal Affairs	Mitcy Larue
	Minister of Habitat, Infrastructure and Land Transport	Charles Bastienne
	Minister of Youth, Sports and Culture	Idith Alexander
	Minister of Employment, Entrepreneurship Development and Business Innovation	Wallace Cosgrow
	Minister of Agriculture and Fisheries	Michael Benstrong
	Minister of Tourism, Civil Aviation, Ports and Marine	Alain St Ange - Maurice Loustau-Lalanne
	Minister of Environment, Energy & Climate Change	Didier Dogley
	Minister of Education and Human Resources Development	Joël Morgan
	Minister of Family Affairs (new from 15 March 2017)	Jeanne Siméon
	Designated Minister and Minister of Local Government	Macsuzy Mondon

== See also ==
- Politics of Seychelles
