= Minister for Foreign Affairs (Seychelles) =

The Minister for Foreign Affairs of the Republic of Seychelles is a cabinet minister in charge of the Ministry of Foreign Affairs of Seychelles, responsible for conducting foreign relations of the country.

The following is a list of foreign ministers of Seychelles since its founding in 1976:

No.	Name (Birth–Death)	Portrait	Tenure
1	Sir James Mancham (1939–2017)		1976–1977
2	Guy Sinon (1933–1991)		1977–1979
3	Jacques Hodoul (1943–2021)		1979–1982
4	Maxime Ferrari (1930–2021)		1982–1984
5	France-Albert René (1935–2019)		1984–1989
6	Danielle de St. Jorre (1941–1997)		1989–1997
(5)	France-Albert René (1935–2019)		1997
7	Jérémie Bonnelame (b. 1938)		1997–2005
8	Patrick Pillay		2005–2009
9	James Michel (b. 1944)		2009–2010
10	Jean-Paul Adam (b. 1977)		2010–2015
11	Joel Morgan (b. 1961)		2015–2016
12	Danny Faure (b. 1962)		2016–2018
13	Vincent Meriton (b. 1960)		2018–2020
14	Sylvestre Radegonde (b. 1956)		2020–2025
15	Barry Faure (b. 1964)		2025–present

== See also ==
- Ministry of Foreign Affairs (Seychelles)
