= Franco-Seychellois =

Languages
- French, English, Seychellois Creole

Religion
- Catholic

Franco-Seychellois are people of French descent living in the Seychelles. Franco-Seychellois have played an important role in the country's history both before and since independence. Around 17,000 people, or 14% of the people living on the Seychelles, have French ancestry.

== Origins ==
Many Franco-Seychellois settled on the islands during the period of French rule over the archipelago. During this time, African and Malagasy slaves were also brought to the Seychelles. Franco-Seychellois were allowed to retain their culture after the British took control of the Seychelles.

== History ==
Historically, French-speaking European Seychellois were divided between two classes, grands blancs, who represented the wealthy planter class, and petit blancs, who represented the working classes. The grands blancs are a less numerous group, composed of only about forty large families, but held most of the land and political power in the islands in the colonial era. The Planters and Taxpayers Association, which represented the interests of the grands blancs, dominated the Legislative Council of Seychelles from its inception in 1962. The two groups were historically divided, and as a consequence the petit blancs were politically aligned with the Seychellois Creole people by the 1960s. Upon the independence of Seychelles, many Franco-Seychellois played important roles in the development of a one-party socialist state under the leadership of France-Albert René (himself ethnically French) and the Seychelles People's United Party.

=== Modern history ===
Franco-Seychellois play an important role in the country's economy. They are employed in all sectors, including government, business and education.

== Language and religion ==
The majority of Franco-Seychellois speak Seychellois Creole, the country's most widely spoken language. They also often speak French and English. Of the religiously affiliated, the large majority are Roman Catholic, with a minority belonging to other Christian denominations.

== Notable people ==
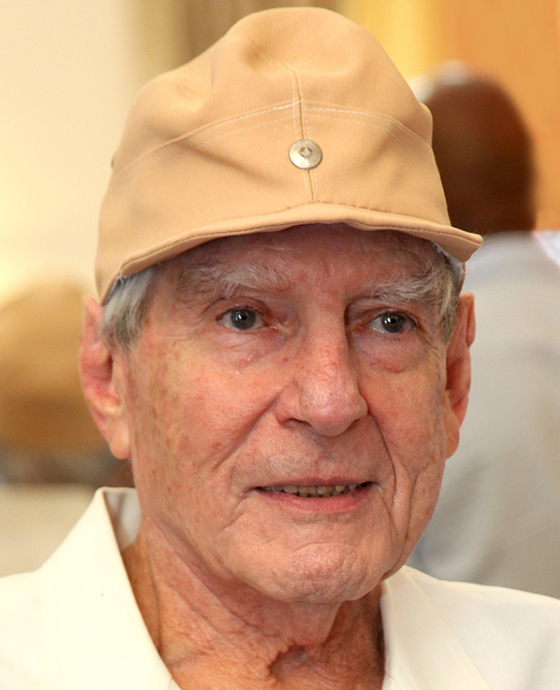
France-Albert René

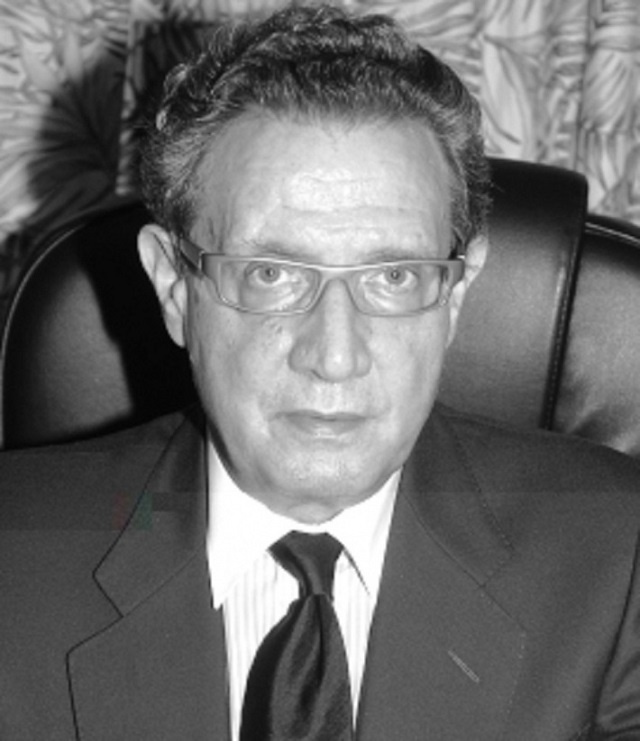
Jacques Hodoul

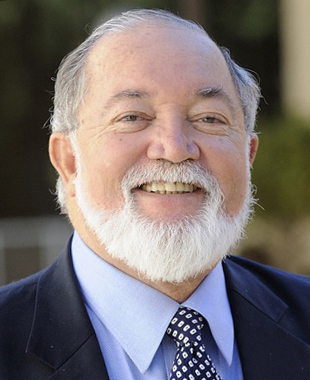
James Mancham

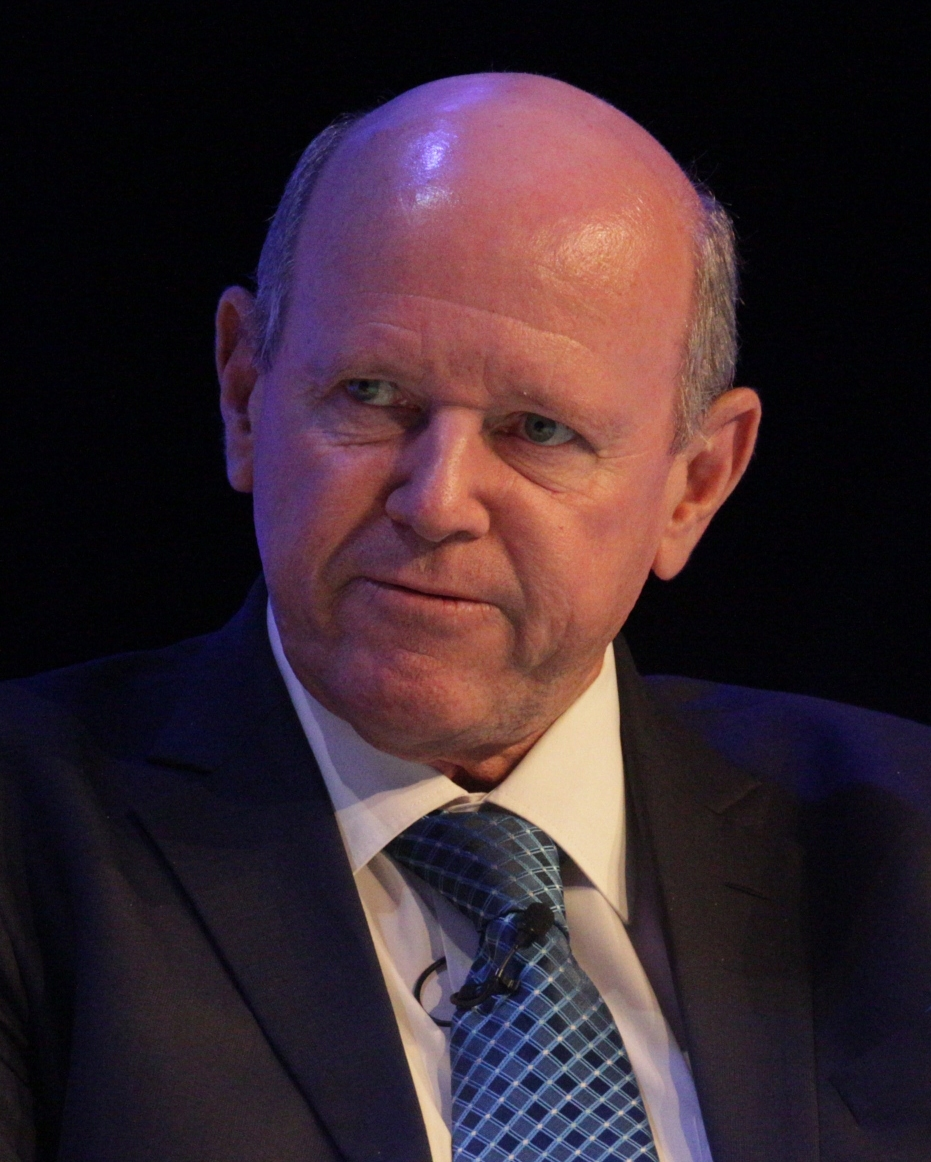
Alain St Ange

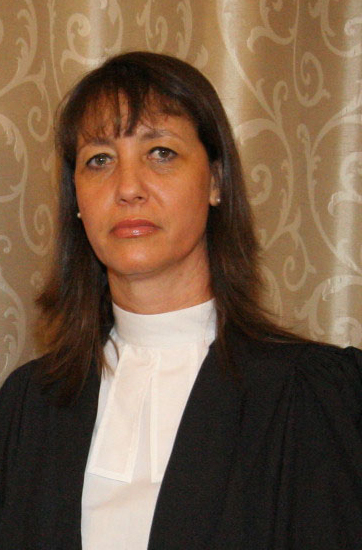
Mathilda Twomey

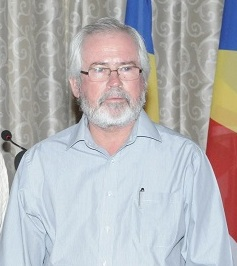
Maurice Loustau-Lalanne

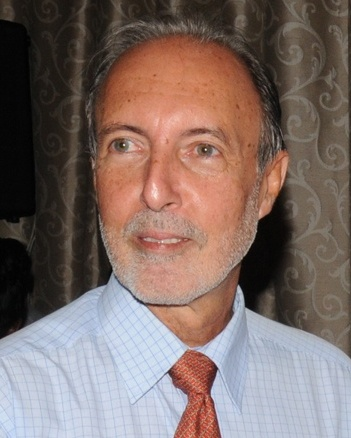
Bernard Georges

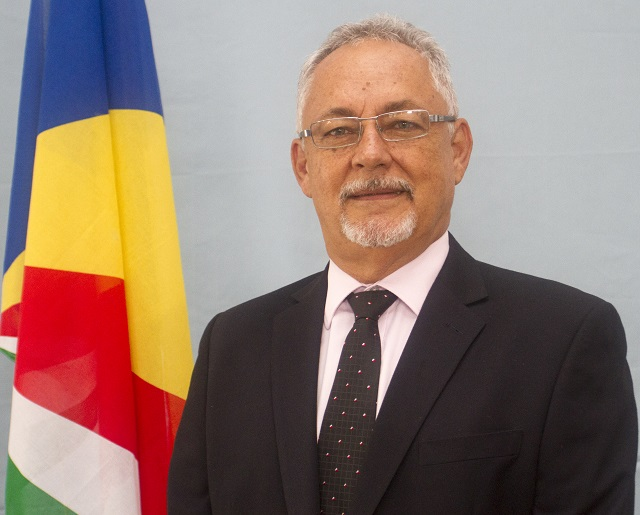
Jean-François Ferrari

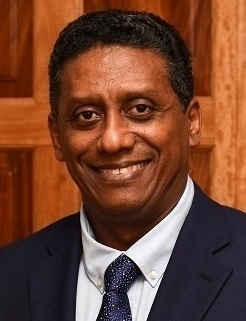
Danny Faure

- France-Albert René - long-time socialist President of Seychelles from 1977 to 2004
- James Alix Michel - President of Seychelles from 2004 to 2016
- Alain St Ange - Minister of Tourism and Culture
- Jean-François Ferrari - Minister of Fisheries
- Gérard Hoarau - opposition leader in the Seychelles as head of the Seychelles National Movement, assassinated in 1985 in London.
- James Mancham - the first President of Seychelles from 1976 to 1977.
- Jean-Paul Adam - Minister of Foreign Affairs
- Mathilda Twomey - lawyer and former Chief Justice
- Bernard Georges - Member of the National Assembly
- Danny Faure - President of Seychelles from 2016 to 2020
