= James Michel =

3rd President of Seychelles

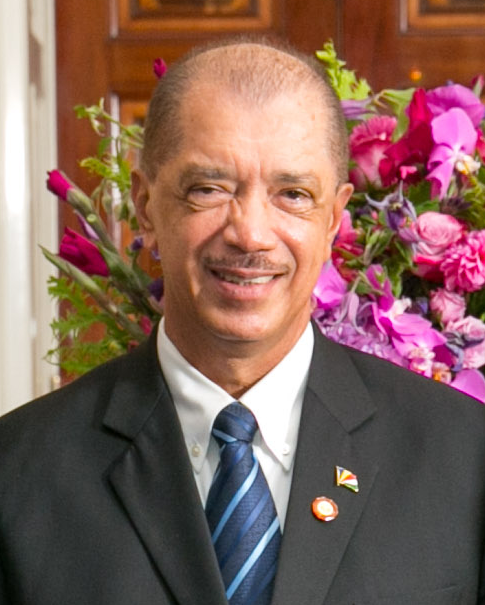
- Michel in 2014

3rd President of Seychelles
- In office 14 July 2004 – 16 October 2016
- Vice President: Joseph Belmont (2004–2010); Danny Faure (2010–2016)
- Preceded by: France-Albert René
- Succeeded by: Danny Faure

1st Vice-President of Seychelles
- In office 18 August 1996 – 14 July 2004
- President: France-Albert René
- Preceded by: Position established
- Succeeded by: Joseph Belmont

Personal details
- Born: 16 August 1944 (age 81) Mahé, Colony of Seychelles
- Party: People's Party
- Spouse: Natalie Michel

James Alix Michel, GCSK (born 16 August 1944) is a Seychellois politician who served as the third President of Seychelles from 2004 to 2016. He previously served as vice-president under his predecessor, France-Albert René, from 1996 to 2004.

Michel was initially a teacher, but later he became involved in the archipelago's booming tourism industry and joined René's political party before independence in 1976.

== Life and career ==
Michel followed President René through different political posts during all periods of the Seychelles' history as an independent entity. He was a member of the executive committee of the Seychelles People's United Party from 1974 to 1977; subsequently, when the party was transformed into the Seychelles People's Progressive Front (SPPF), he became a member of its Central Executive Committee. René staged a coup against the country's first President, James Mancham, only one year after independence, and Michel was appointed Minister of Public Administration and Information in June 1977. During the 1979–1991 one-party socialist rule, Michel held various ruling party and ministerial portfolios, such as Minister of Finance from 1989 to 2006. In 1984 he became the SPPF's Deputy Secretary-General, and in 1994 he became its secretary-general.

During the rule of President René, Michel held positions with a significant role Seychellois economic policy on several occasions. In these 27 years, the Seychelles experienced a period of economic growth based on its tourism and fishery sectors, which was followed by stagnation in the 1990s. Beginning in 2008, around the time of the Great Recession Michel had presided over a program of macroeconomic reforms in a neoliberal direction, featuring a massive reduction in public budget deficit (‘austerity measures’) and a complete liberalisation of foreign exchange transactions.

This was a continuation of move away from the policies adopted during dictatorial rule, yet continuous in seeing the island nation's potential as a hub for offshore financial services at advantageous conditions compared to other countries as a means to acquire foreign exchange. This was a policy chosen by many smaller island nations, different than focusing on industrial growth that would be possible to exchange for foreign currency, as well as attract the development of connected services (especially financial services serving local industry and consumers, as well as tourist services using industrial products).

Michel played a major potlical role in the country's democratisation process, importantly with the return of multi-party elections in 1993. However, political opponents have maintained Seychelles still suffers from limited freedom and transparency of the press, even raising claims of rigged elections. International observers present during Seychellois elections held since 1993 had declared them to have been "free and fair." According to official results, President René and his Seychelles People's Progressive Front party won presidential and legislative elections in 2001 and 2002 respectively, with about 54% of the vote in both cases.

After retiring from politics in 2016, Michel created the James Michel Foundation to fund and support projects that focus on blue economy and climate change.

=== Presidency ===
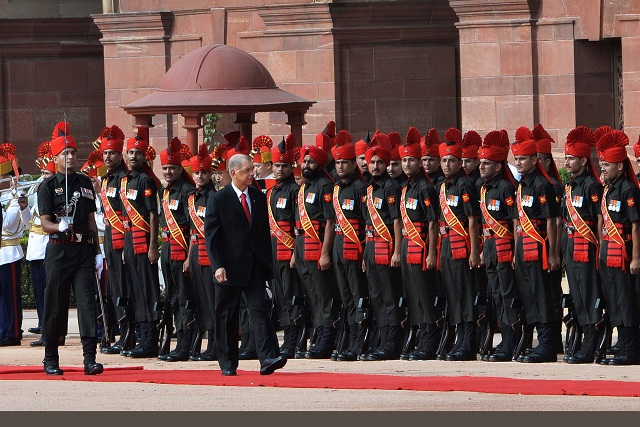
Michel inspecting an Indian Army guard of honour at Rashtrapati Bhawan in New Delhi.

After serving as vice-president for nearly eight years, beginning in August 1996, Michel became president on 14 July 2004, when René stepped down. At that point, Michel was René's longest-serving cabinet minister. As President, he held the portfolios of Defence, Police, Information, and Risk & Disaster Management.

Seychelles' opposition leader, Wavel Ramkalawan, expressed increased concern over the declining trends in the national economy and demanded more dialogue with the ruling party. The leader of the Seychelles National Party furthermore said that he would be cooperating with President Michel.

Michel won the presidential election held on 28–30 July 2006, taking 53.7% of the vote. He was sworn in for his new term on 1 August 2006. Michel won re-election in May 2011, receiving 55.4% of the vote. He was sworn in for his new term of office on 22 May 2011.

In early 2015, Michel confirmed that he planned to run for a third term in the next presidential election. Reflecting on his time in office, he said: "I worked hard, I did everything for Seychelles [and] the Seychellois people and I feel that people appreciate my work." His term was scheduled to end in 2016, but he announced on 1 October 2015 that the next election would be held a few months earlier. The date was subsequently set for 3–5 December 2015. He very narrowly defeated Ramkalawan in a run-off by a margin of less than 200 votes.

Michel announced on 27 September 2016 that he was resigning, effective 16 October, and handing over power to Vice-President Danny Faure, less than a year into his third term. The decision coincided with the election of an opposition majority in the National Assembly in the September 2016 parliamentary election. Michel said that "a new generation of Parti Lepep will take Seychelles to the next frontier of its development" and that he felt "a sense of mission accomplished".

=== 2015 Cabinet ===
Party key	People's Party

Cabinet of Seychelles: February 2015 – October 2016
Portrait	Portfolio	Incumbent
	President; Minister of Defence, Legal Affairs, Information and Hydrocarbons	H.E. James Michel
	Vice President of Seychelles; Minister of ICT; Youth and Public Administration; and Civil Society	H.E. Danny Faure
	Minister of Community Development, Social Affairs & Sports	Vincent Mériton
	Minister of Foreign Affairs and Transport	Joël Morgan
	Minister of Education	Macsuzy Mondon
	Minister of Finance, Trade & The Blue Economy	Jean-Paul Adam
	Minister of Health	Mitcy Larue
	Minister of Tourism & Culture	Alain St Ange
	Minister of Land Use & Housing	Christian Lionnet
	Minister of Labour and Human Resources Development	Idith Alexander
	Minister of Home Affairs	Charles Bastienne
	Minister of Environment, Energy & Climate Change	Didier Dogley
	Minister of Investment, Entrepreneurship Development and Business Innovation	Michael Benstrong
	Minister of Fisheries and Agriculture	Wallace Cosgrow

== Awards and decorations ==
- Mauritius:
  - Grand Commander of the Order of the Star and Key of the Indian Ocean (2012)
- Serbia:
  - Second Class of the Order of the Republic of Serbia (2016)
- Sovereign Military Order of Malta:
  - Grand Cross Special Class of the Order pro Merito Melitensi (2010)

Political offices
New office	Vice-President of Seychelles; 1996–2004	Succeeded by Joseph Belmont
Preceded by France-Albert René	President of Seychelles; 2004–2016	Succeeded by Danny Faure
