= India–Seychelles relations =

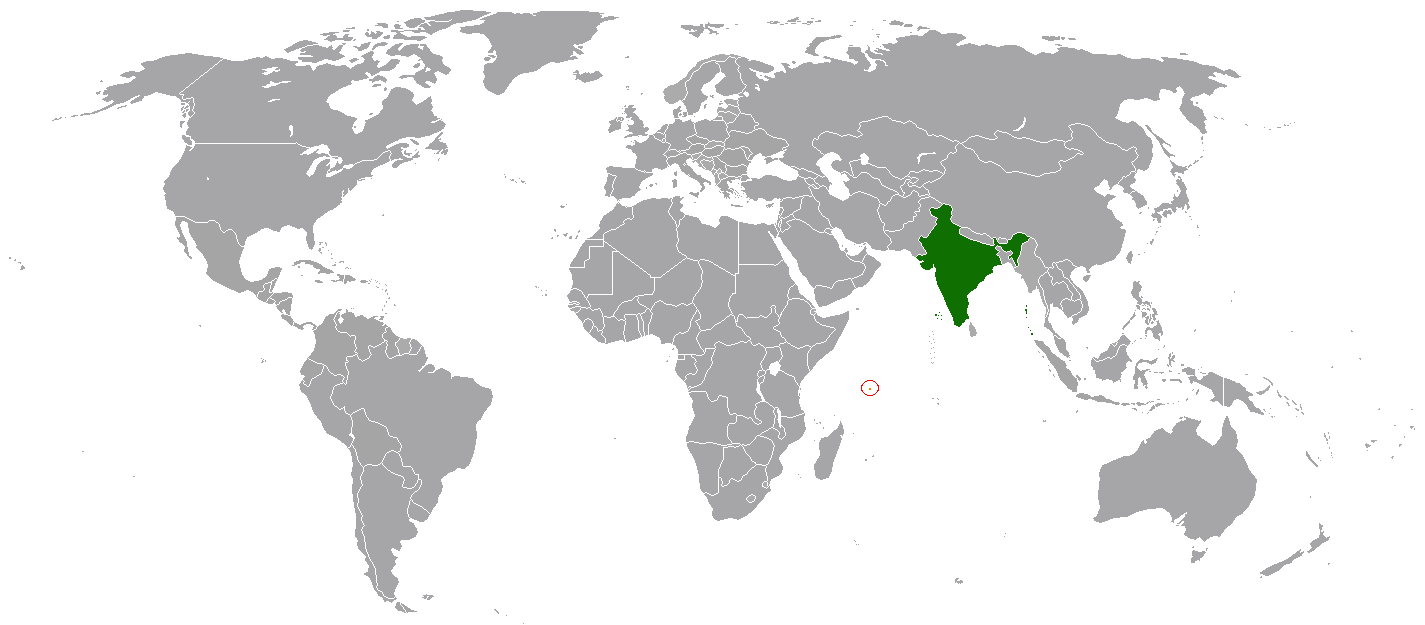

- India: Seychelles

India–Seychelles relations are bilateral relations between the Republic of India and the Republic of Seychelles. India has a High Commission in Victoria while Seychelles maintains a High Commission in New Delhi.

== History ==
Diplomatic ties between India and Seychelles have existed since Seychelles gained independence in 1976. A resident high commissioner of India has been in Victoria since 1987 while Seychelles opened its resident mission in New Delhi in 2008. Relations between the two countries have been warm and cordial with regular high level exchange visits between the countries. From India, Prime Minister Indira Gandhi and Presidents R Venkataraman and Pratibha Patil have visited the Seychelles, while Presidents France Albert Rene, James Alix Michel and Danny Faure of Seychelles have paid state visits to India. India and Seychelles have broad based relations that cover a host of sectors including defence, culture, trade and technical cooperation. According to the Ministry of External Affairs of the Government of India, relations between India and Seychelles have been characterised by "close friendship, understanding and cooperation", while Seychelles has described itself as a "rock of dependability for India in the Indian Ocean region”.

In its foreign relations, Seychelles maximizes the benefits it receives from both India and China by taking advantage of those two countries' rivalry with respect to the strategic waterway in which Seychelles exists.

== Economic relations ==
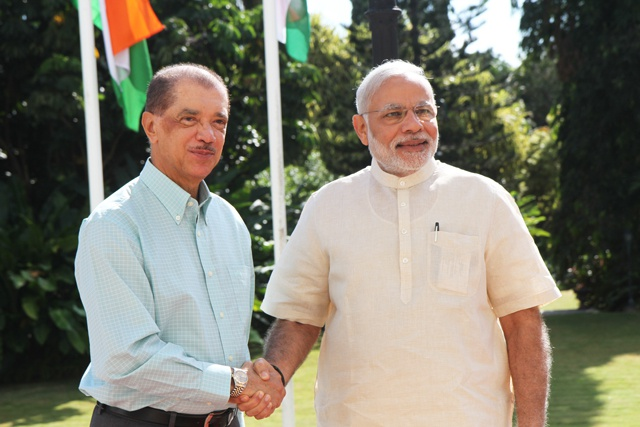
Seychelles President James Michel hands with Indian prime minister Narendra Modi

Trade between India and Seychelles amounted to only US$40 million in 2010–11 with the balance of trade heavily in India's favour. Tourism, fishing, petroleum exploration, communications and IT, computer education and pharmaceuticals have been identified as areas of economic cooperation between the two countries. India and Seychelles signed a bilateral investment promotion agreement in 2010 and in 2012, during President Pratibha Patil's visit to Seychelles, India extended it a $50 million line of credit and a grant of $25 million. Among India's private sector companies, telecom major Airtel has a significant presence in Seychelles, having acquired Telecom Seychelles and partnered in the Seychelles East Africa submarine cable project.

== Defence Cooperation ==
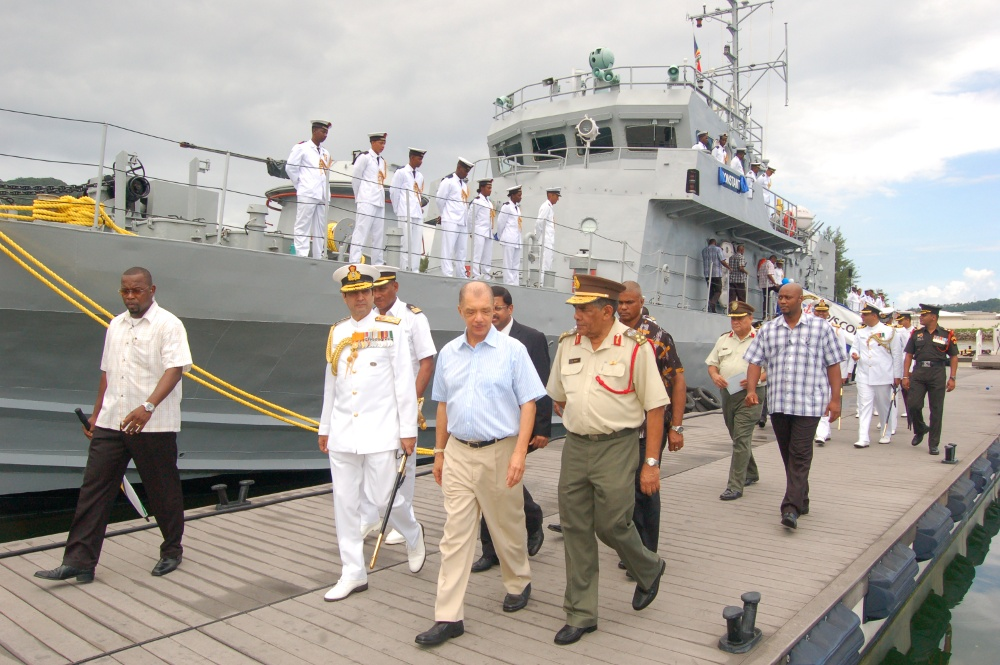
Adm Robin K Dhowan and Seychelles President James Michel at a ceremony to transfer INS Tarasa (T63) from the Indian Navy to the Seychelles Coast Guard, 7 November 2014.

India and Seychelles have a close defence ties. Seychelles is of strategic importance to India as it lies close to global lanes of shipping and commerce and is an important base in the fight against seaborne terrorism and piracy in the Indian Ocean Region. In June 1986, the Indian Navy deployed the INS Vindhyagiri at the Seychelles Port of Victoria to abort an attempted coup against President Rene by Defence Minister Berlouis in what was called Operation Flowers are Blooming. India helped avert a further attempted coup by Berlouis in September 1986, when Indian prime minister Rajiv Gandhi lent President René his plane so that he could fly back from an international meeting in Harare to the Seychelles. President René reportedly took shelter in the resident of the Indian High Commissioner in Male.

In 2009, India acted upon a request of the Seychelles and dispatched naval ships to patrol the exclusive economic zone of Seychelles and to guard it against piracy. India has provided Seychelles with monetary support and equipment such as Dornier 228s and Chetak helicopters for meeting its defence needs besides deputing officers from the Indian armed forces in Seychelles and helping in capacity building of the Seychelles' armed forces.

Various Indian Navy ships have visited Seychelles as part of their anti-piracy deployment and protection of Seychelles EEZ, including INS Tarmugli (T64) in February 2005, INS Sukanya in March 2011, INS Shardul from 4 to 6 June 2011 and from 17 to 19 June, 2011 and INS Sarvekshak, which visited Port Victoria on 7 November 2011 and conducted hydrographic survey of Aldabra.

The Seychelles government has leased the Assumption Island to the Indian Navy to build an overseas base of operations there. The Indian Army is helping to renovate the airfield while the navy has taken permission from the Seychelles government to make a new deep sea port by dredging sand for the same instead of using the ruined, old jetty which is already present. The residents of the island were relocated to another island by the help of Indian Government. Seychelles maritime security advisor is also an Indian naval officer.

In June 2018, Indian prime minister Narendra Modi announced that India was extending Seychelles a US$100 million credit to develop its defence capabilities.

== Technical Cooperation ==
India has been working on human resource development and capacity building with the Government of Seychelles under the Indian Technical and Economic Cooperation Programme since the early 1980s. India is a medical tourism destination for the Seychellois and the Government of Seychelles has tied up with MIOT Hospitals and Madras Medical Mission in Chennai for providing healthcare to its citizens. The two nations have also been working together in the areas of environment protection and renewable energy and India is to set up a solar power cluster in Seychelles. Seychelles is also promoting itself as a tourist destination in India although Indian tourists numbered only 8200 in 2010.

== See also ==
- Indo-Seychellois
- Hinduism in Seychelles
- High Commission of India, Victoria
