= Wallace Cosgrow =

Seychellois politician

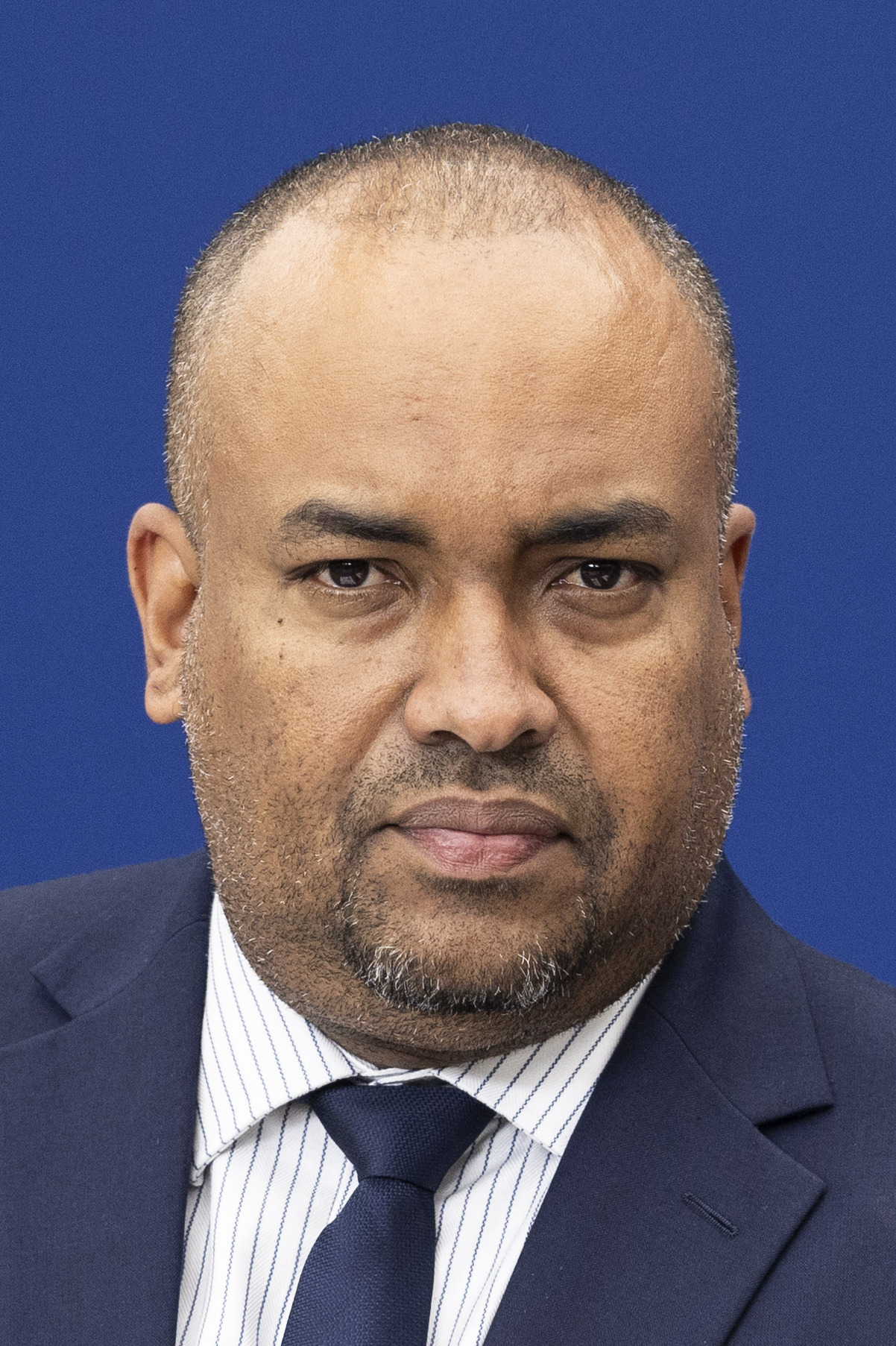
- Wallace Cosgrow in 2026

Minister for Industry, Entrepreneurship Development and Business Innovation
- In office 7 July 2017 – 27 April 2018
- President: Danny Faure
- Succeeded by: Vincent Mériton

Minister for Environment, Energy and Climate Change
- In office 27 April 2018 – 3 November 2020
- President: Danny Faure
- Preceded by: Didier Dogley
- Succeeded by: Flavien Joubert

Minister for Fisheries
- Incumbent
- Assumed office 6 November 2025
- President: Patrick Herminie
- Preceded by: Jean-François Ferrari

Personal details
- Born: 7 December 1978
- Occupation: politician

Wallace Cosgrow (born 7 December 1978) is a Seychellois politician who served as the Minister for Environment, Energy and Climate Change. He was appointed by President Danny Faure on 26 April 2018 after a cabinet reshuffle. He served until 3 November 2020. He was formerly Minister for Industry, Entrepreneurship Development and Business Innovation in 2017.
