= Jeanne Siméon =

Seychellois politician

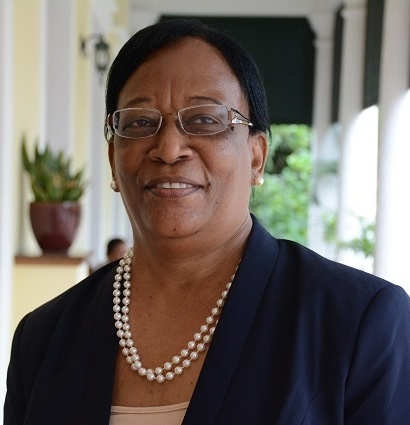
- Jeanne Simeon in 2017

Minister of Family Affairs
- In office 15 March 2017 – 26 April 2018
- President: Danny Faure
- Preceded by: office created
- Succeeded by: Mitcy Larue

Minister of Education & Human Resource Development
- In office 27 April 2018 – 3 November 2020
- President: Danny Faure
- Preceded by: Joël Morgan
- Succeeded by: Justin Valentin

Personal details
- Born: 28 July 1952 (age 74)
- Education: University of Leeds; University of York
- Occupation: Politician

Jeanne Siméon (born 28 July 1952) is a Seychellois politician who was the Minister of Habitat, Lands, Infrastructure, and Land Transport from 27 April 2018 until 3 November 2020.

Previously Siméon served as Deputy Secretary for Cabinet Affairs in the Office of the President from October 2016 until being appointed as Minister in the newly formed Ministry of Family Affairs on 15 March 2017. Simeon was educated at the University of York and at the University of Leeds. After working as a teacher Siméon served as Principal Secretary of Education in the Ministry of Education
