= Pamela Charlette =

Seychellois

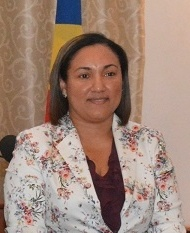

Minister of Fisheries and Agriculture
- In office 7 July 2017 – 26 April 2018
- President: Danny Faure
- Preceded by: Michael Benstrong
- Succeeded by: Charles Bastienne

Minister of Habitat, Lands, Infrastructure, and Land Transport
- In office 27 April 2018 – October 2020
- President: Danny Faure
- Preceded by: Charles Bastienne
- Succeeded by: Antony Derjacques

Minister of Social Affairs, Family and Equality
- Incumbent
- Assumed office 6 November 2025
- President: Patrick Herminie
- Preceded by: Patricia Francourt (Social Affairs); Marie-Celine Zialor (Family)

Personal details
- Occupation: Cabinet minister

Pamela Charlette is a Seychellois politician who is serving as Minister of Social Affairs, Family and Equality since 6 November 2025.

Previously Charlette served as the Minister of Habitat, Lands, Infrastructure, and Land Transport between 27 April 2018 and 3 November 2020 and Minister of Fisheries and Agriculture from 7 July 2017 to 27 April 2018 after being principal secretary for Entrepreneurial Development and Business innovation.
