= Macsuzy Mondon =

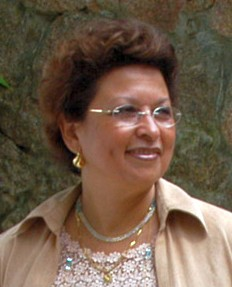

Designated Minister
- In office 28 October 2016 – 3 November 2020
- President: Danny Faure
- Preceded by: Vincent Mériton
- Succeeded by: Jean-François Ferrari

Personal details
- Party: People's Party
- Children: 3
- Education: University of Quebec at Trois Rivières

Macsuzy Mondon is a Seychellois teacher and politician who has served in the Cabinet of Seychelles as Designated Minister and Minister of Local Government from October 2016 until 3 November 2020.

== Career ==
Mondon, a former teacher, was appointed as Minister of Health in 2006 and subsequently served as Minister of Education from 2010 to 2016. In the cabinet of President Danny Faure, appointed in October 2016, she became the first woman to serve as Designated Minister; she was sworn in on 28 October, and she was additionally appointed as Minister for Local Government on 29 October, while leaving her post as Minister of Education. In the April 2018 reshuffle Youth, Sports, Culture, and Disaster Management were added to her ministries.
