= Alain St Ange =

Seychellois politician

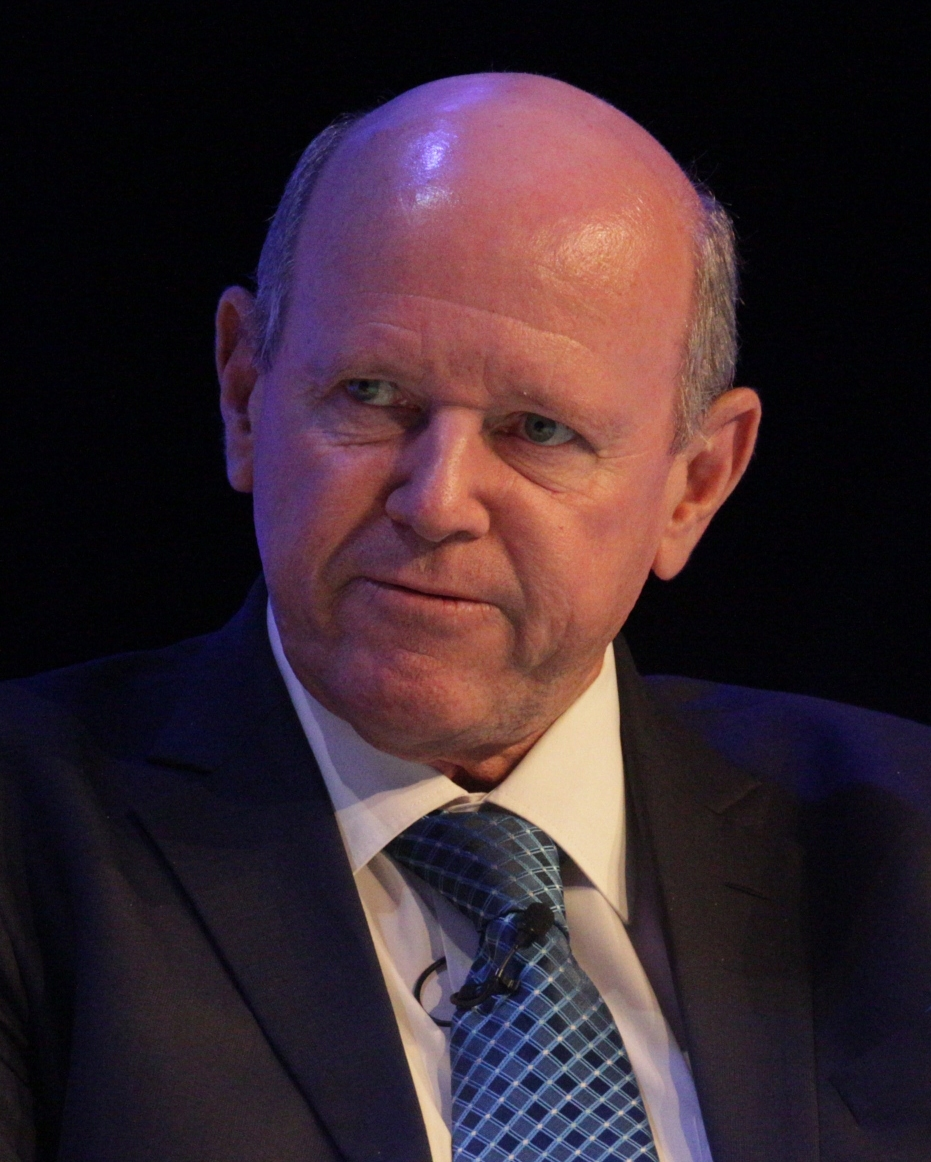
- St Ange in 2015

Minister of Tourism and Culture
- In office February 2012 – December 2016
- President: James Michel; Danny Faure
- Preceded by: James Michel
- Succeeded by: Maurice Loustau-Lalanne

Personal details
- Born: 24 October 1954 (age 72) La Digue, Seychelles
- Party: One Seychelles
- Spouse: Ginette Michel
- Children: 2

Alain St Ange (born 24 October 1954) is a Seychellois politician who served as minister for Tourism and Culture, and later for Tourism, Civil Aviation, Ports and Marine, of Seychelles from 2012 to 2016. He is the former president, and one of the key founders, of the Vanilla Islands. He is the president of the African Tourism Board.

== Career ==
St Ange has been working in the tourism business since 2009. He was appointed as the director of marketing by President James Michel and Minister of Tourism. After one year of service, he was promoted to the CEO of the Seychelles Tourism Board. In 2012 the Indian Ocean Vanilla Islands regional Organization was formed and St Ange was appointed as the first president of the organization. In a 2012 cabinet re-shuffle, St Ange was appointed as minister of Tourism and Culture. He was then given more responsibilities by President Danny Faure in 2016 when he became minister of Tourism, Civil Aviation, Ports & Marine. He resigned on 28 December 2016 in order to pursue a candidacy as secretary general of the World Tourism Organization, which was withdrawn on 9 May 2017 due to the support of the African Union for Walter Mzembi, the Zimbabwean candidate. St. Ange is today the president of the "One Seychelles" political party.

== List of works ==
- Seychelles what next?, by Alain St Ange, 1991
- Seychelles : in search of democracy : a constitutional & political history of Seychelles, 1723-2004, by Alain Georges, Bernard, St. Ange, 2005, AISN B007HFWSU6
- Seychelles, The Cry of A People, by Alain St Ange, 2007, published by Imprimerie Toscane, ISBN 978-99931-3-001-7
- Seychelles, The 2010 Regatta, by Alain St Ange, 2011, ISBN 978-0-646-54293-5
