= Maurice Loustau-Lalanne =

Seychellois government minister

Maurice Jean Leonard Loustau-Lalanne
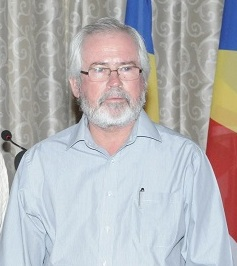

Minister for Tourism
- In office 30 December 2016 – 26 April 2018
- President: Danny Faure
- Preceded by: Alain St Ange
- Succeeded by: Didier Dogley

Minister of Finance, Trade, Investment and Economic Planning
- In office 27 April 2018 – 29 October 2020
- President: Danny Faure
- Preceded by: Peter Larose
- Succeeded by: Naadir Hassan

Personal details
- Party: United Seychelles Party
- Occupation: Cabinet Minister

Maurice Jean Leonard Loustau-Lalanne is a Seychellois politician who served as the Minister of Finance, Trade, Investment and Economic Planning. He was appointed by President Danny Faure on 26 April 2018 and served until 29 October 2020. He was previously the Minister of Tourism in January 2016.
