= Jean-Paul Adam =

Seychellois politician

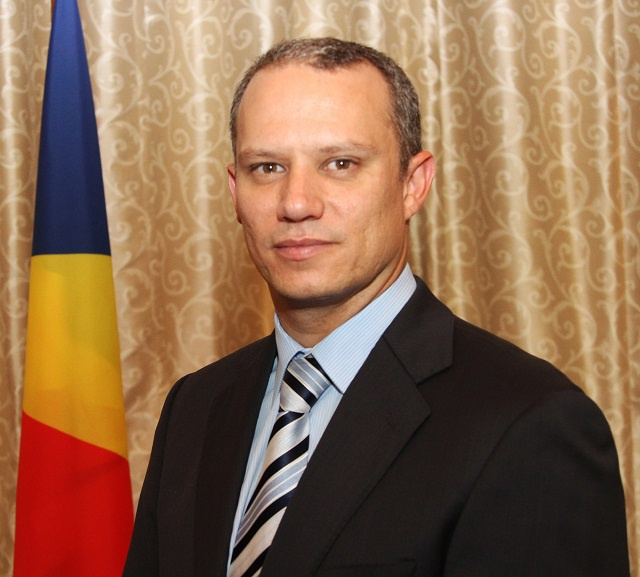

Ministry of Health and Social Affairs
- In office 28 October 2016 – 30 October 2020
- President: Danny Faure
- Preceded by: Mitcy Larue
- Succeeded by: Peggy Vidot

Minister of Finance, Trade & The Blue Economy
- In office February 2015 – October 2016
- President: James Michel
- Preceded by: Pierre Laporte
- Succeeded by: Peter Larose

Minister for Foreign Affairs
- In office 1 July 2010 – February 2015
- President: James Michel
- Succeeded by: Joël Morgan
- Preceded by: James Michel

Personal details
- Born: 12 June 1977 (age 49) Mahé, Seychelles
- Party: People's Party
- Education: University of Sheffield; University of Manchester

Jean-Paul Adam (born 12 June 1977) is a Seychellois politician. He served as Minister of Health and Social Affairs in the Cabinet of Seychelles until 30 October 2020. He previously served as Minister of Finance, Trade & The Blue Economy from 2015 to 2016, and, before that, as Minister for Foreign Affairs from 2010 to 2015. Between 2020 and 2023, he was Director for Technology, Climate Change and Natural Resources Management at the United Nations Economic Commission for Africa. Since then he has been Director for Policy, Monitoring and Advocacy in the United Nations Office of the Special Adviser on Africa to the Secretary-General.

== Education and teaching ==
Adams received his early education in Seychelles. He then travelled to the UK, where he obtained a BA (Hons) in English literature and French at the University of Sheffield. After which, he proceeded to complete his MA in international political economy at the University of Manchester.

Between January 2006 to January 2009, Adam taught international politics as a part-time lecturer with the Manchester University and Seychelles Polytechnic Twinning Programme, and, since 2007, has also been a member of the board of trustees of the Seychelles University Foundation.

== Political career ==
Initially, Adam started his diplomatic career within the Ministry of Foreign Affairs as a trainee protocol officer (1996–1997) and then as second secretary (2001–2004). He later went on to serve as the director general of Presidential Affairs (2006–2007), principal secretary in the Office of the President (2007–2009), and secretary of state in the Office of the President (2009–2010), before being appointed minister for foreign affairs in June 2010.

== Personal life ==
In addition to his experience as a public servant, on numerous occasions Adam has competed in swimming for Seychelles, often at an international level. In point of fact, he competed in the 1992 Barcelona Olympics, the 1994 World Swimming Championships in Rome, the 1998 World Swimming Championships in Perth, Australia, the 1998 Commonwealth Games, the 2002 Commonwealth Games and the 2003 World Swimming Championships in Barcelona. He won a bronze medal at the 1999 African Games held in Johannesburg, South Africa in the 4 x 200-metre freestyle relay. Moreover, in the Indian Ocean Island Games held in Seychelles, Reunion and Mauritius in 1993, 1998 and 2003 respectively, he also won silver and bronze medals.

Adam is married and has two daughters.
