= Minister of Finance (Seychelles) =

Government post in the Republic of the Seychelles

The Minister of Finance, Trade, Investment and Economic Planning of Seychelles is a cabinet minister in charge of the Ministry for Finance of Seychelles, responsible for public finances of the country. The ministry is located in Central Bank Building in Victoria.

== Ministers of Finance ==
Name	Took office	Left office	President	Notes
Chamery Chetty	October 1975	June 1977	James Mancham	
Maxime Ferrari	1978	1978	France-Albert René	
France-Albert René	1978	1989	France-Albert René	
James Michel	1989	2006	France-Albert René, James Michel	
Danny Faure	2006	2012	James Michel	
Pierre Laporte	2012	2015	James Michel	
Jean-Paul Adam	February 2015	October 2016	James Michel	
Peter Larose	October 2016	April 2018	Danny Faure	
Maurice Loustau-Lalanne	April 2018	October 2020	Danny Faure	
Naadir Hassan	November 2020	October 2025	Wavel Ramkalawan	
Pierre Laporte	7 November 2025	Incumbent	Patrick Herminie	

== See also ==
- Economy of Seychelles
- Central Bank of Seychelles
