= Patricia Francourt =

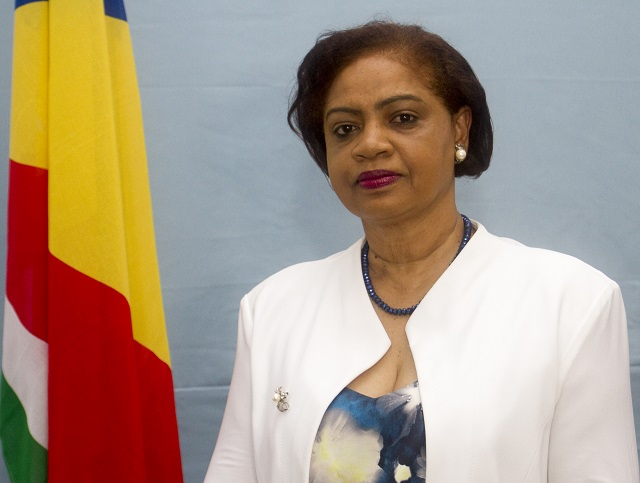

Minister of Employment and Social Affairs
- In office 3 November 2020 – 26 October 2025
- President: Wavel Ramkalawan
- Preceded by: Myriam Telemaque (Employment); Jean-Paul Adam (Social Affairs)
- Succeeded by: Idith Alexander (Employment); Pamela Charlette (Social Affairs)

Personal details
- Political party: Linyon Demokratik Seselwa
- Occupation: Politician, banker

Patricia Francourt is a Seychellois banker serving from 2020 to 2025 as Minister of Employment and Social Affairs.
