= Charles Bastienne =

Seychellois politician

Minister of Interior
- In office 7 July 2015 – 26 April 2018
- President: Danny Faure
- Preceded by: Joel Morgan

Minister of Fisheries and Agriculture
- In office 27 April 2018 – 3 November 2020
- President: Danny Faure
- Preceded by: Pamela Charlette
- Succeeded by: Jean-François Ferrari (Fisheries); Flavien Joubert (Agriculture)

Personal details
- Party: United Seychelles
- Occupation: politician

Charles Bastienne is a Seychellois politician who served as the Minister of Fisheries and Agriculture. He was appointed by President Danny Faure on 26 April 2018. He was previously the Minister of Interior in January 2015, succeeding Joel Morgan. On 3 November 2020, he was succeeded by Jean-François Ferrari for fisheries and Flavien Joubert for agriculture.
