= Takamaka, Seychelles =

Coordinates: 4°47′S 55°31′E

Takamaka
- District

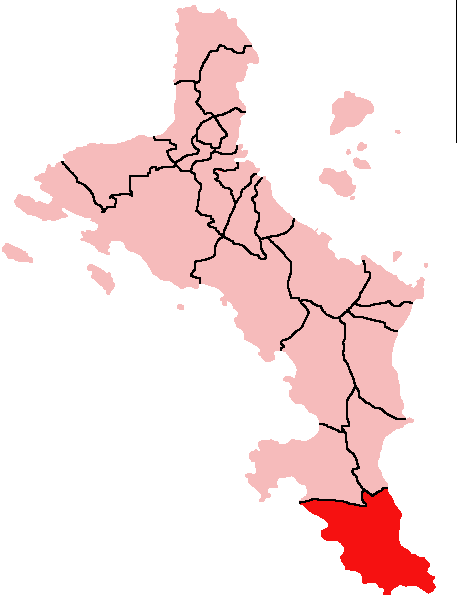
- Location within Mahé Island, Seychelles
- Country: Seychelles

Government
  - District Administrator: Andre Gabriel
  - Member of National Assembly: Hon. Terence Mondon (LDS)

Population (2019 Estimate)
  - Total: 2,850
- Time zone: Seychelles Time

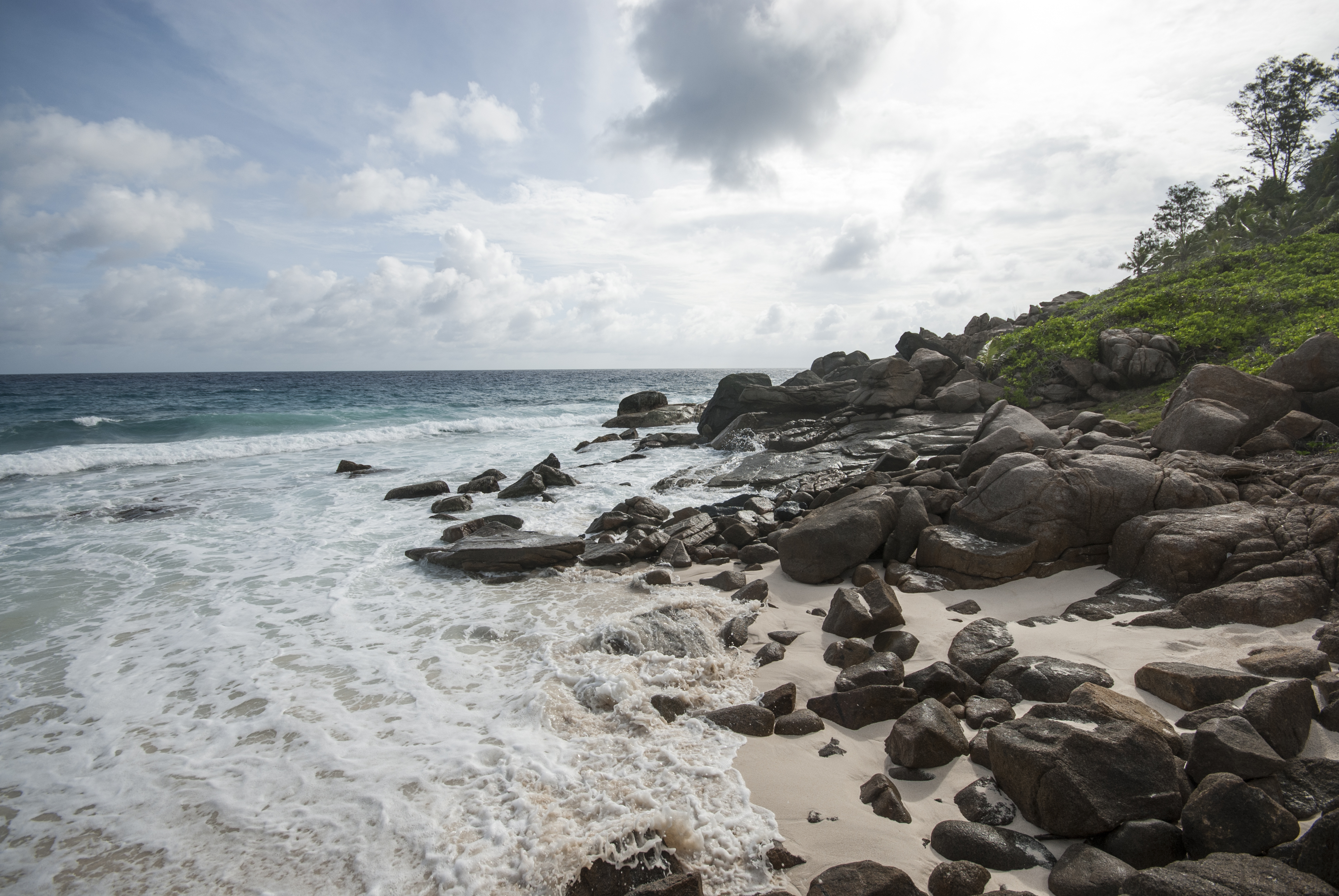
Beach, Anse Cachée, on the southern tip of Mahé.

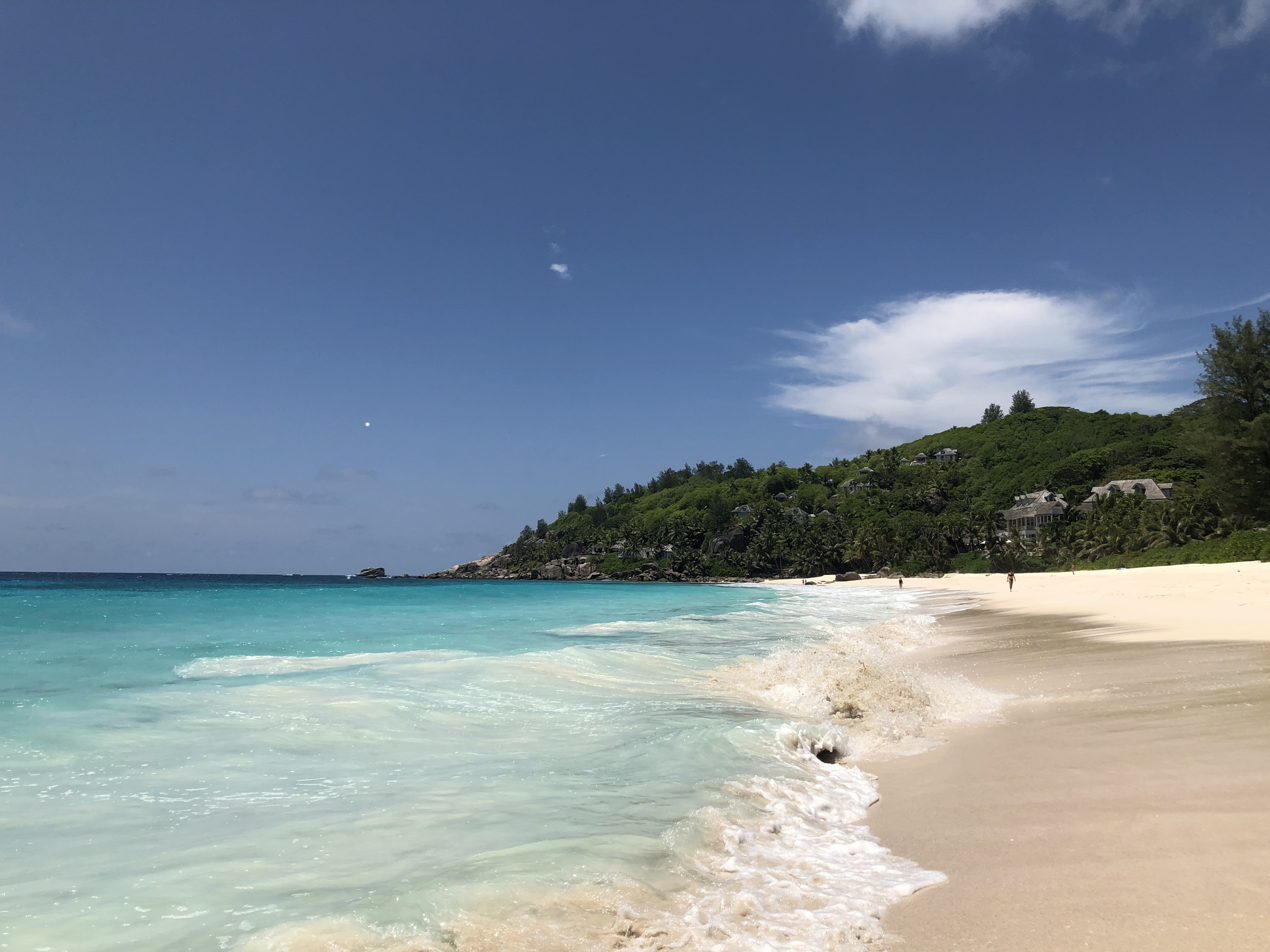
Anse Intendance, on the west coast of Takamaka. The Banyan Tree Resort seen in the background

Takamaka is one of the 26 administrative regions of Mahé, Republic of Seychelles. It is located on the southern part of the island of Mahé. Three other districts cover the two other main islands of the Republic, Grand' Anse and Baie Sainte Anne on the island of Praslin and the inner islands district which comprise the 3rd largest island, La Digue. The population of Takamata is estimated at around 3,000.

== Overview ==
Economic activity is grouped around traditional farming and fishing. There is some tourism-related infrastructure comprising four small hotels (Allamanda Hotel, Captain's Villa (self-catering), Chez Batista). The largest hotel is the Cheval Blanc at Anse Intendance.

Most of the population is employed by the services and trade sector, such as public service and private commerce, including tourism.

As with all districts, there is a primary school, health center, police station and District Administration Office, all grouped around or near the local Roman Catholic Church of Saint Mary Magdalena.

It takes about an hour to commute by public bus to the capital, Victoria, some 25 km away and centre for all administrative and commercial activities. A regular public bus service runs daily from around 05.30 to 20.00 hours.

== Notable people ==
- Devika Vidot (1988–), accountant and politician.
