= Devika Vidot =

Seychellois politician

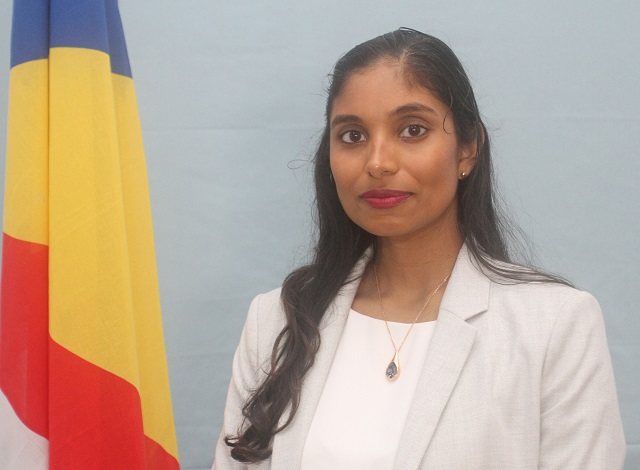

Minister of Investment, Entrepreneurship and Industry
- In office 3 November 2020 – 26 October 2025
- President: Wavel Ramkalawan
- Preceded by: Vincent Mériton
- Succeeded by: Geralda Desaubin

Personal details
- Born: Devika Sumitra Kathrina Vidot; 18 November 1988 (age 36) Takamaka, Seychelles
- Occupation: Accountant, politician

Devika Sumitra Kathrina Vidot (born in Takamaka in November 1988) is a Seychellois accountant and politician. Vidot served as Minister of Investment, Entrepreneurship and Industry from 2020 to 2025.

== Biography ==
Vidot graduated with a degree in accounting and finance from the University of Manchester and a master's degree in professional accountancy. She has worked in the financial service industry and is experienced in auditing. She has also been a lecturer at the University of Seychelles in business administration. Her last occupation was for the offshore industry.

On 31 October 2020, Vidot was elected unanimously as Minister of Investment, Entrepreneurship and Industry. and was sworn in on 3 November 2020..
