= Tourism in Seychelles =

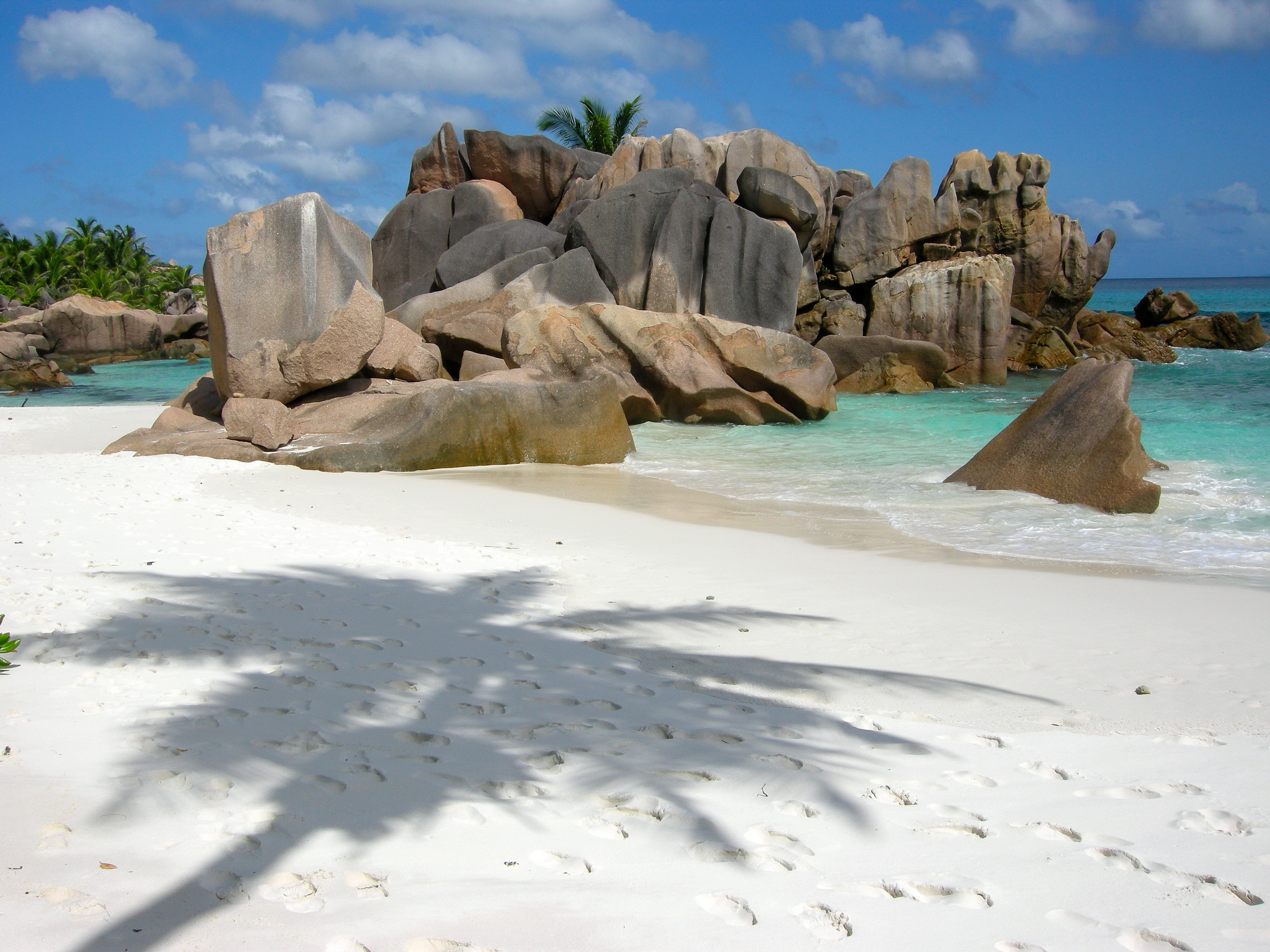
The beach of "Anse Cocos", La Digue.

Tourism is the most important nongovernment sector of Seychelles' economy. About 15 per cent of the formal work force is directly employed in tourism, and employment in construction, banking, transportation, and other activities is closely tied to the tourist industry. Tourists enjoy the Seychelles' coral beaches and opportunities for water sports. Wildlife in the archipelago is also a major attraction.

== History ==
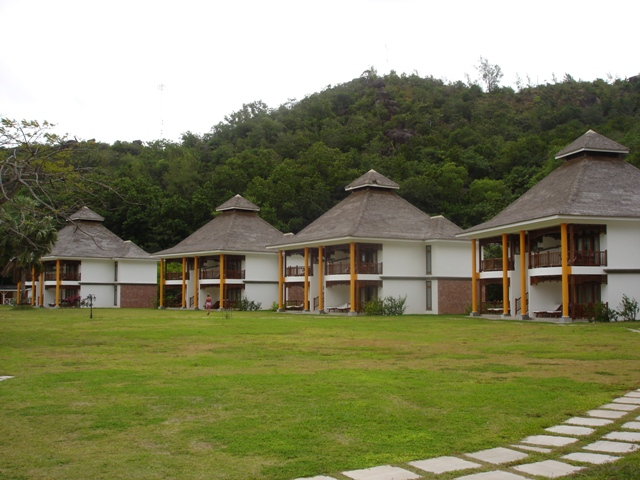
La Reserve Hotel in the Seychelles

The tourist industry was born with the completion of the Seychelles International Airport in 1971, advancing rapidly to a level of 77,400 arrivals in 1979. After slackening in the early 1980, growth was restored through the introduction of casinos, vigorous advertising campaigns, and more competitive pricing. After a decline to 90,050 in 1991 because of the Persian Gulf War, the number of visitors rose to more than 116,000 in 1993. In 1991 France was the leading source of tourists, followed by the United Kingdom, Germany, Italy, and South Africa. Europe provided 80 per cent of the total tourists and Africa—mostly South Africa and Réunion—most of the remainder. European tourists are considered the most lucrative in terms of length of stay and per capita spending.

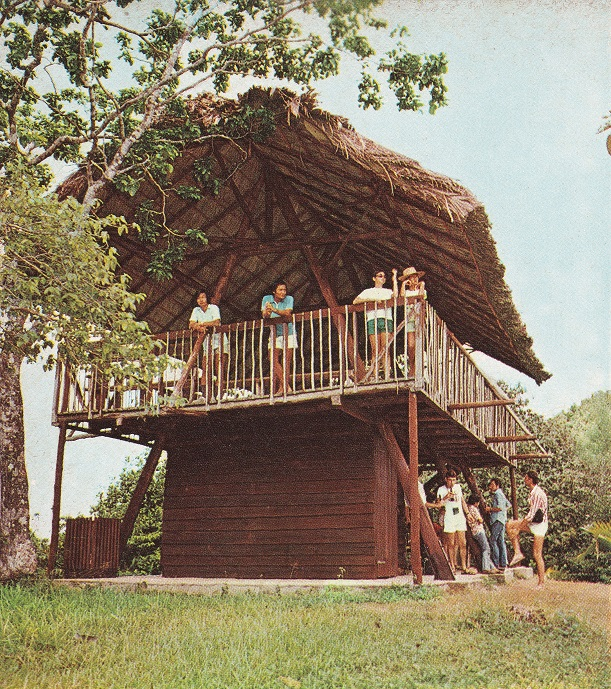
Tourists on the viewing lodge for Vallée de Mai on the island of Praslin, Seychelles (1970s)

Under the 1990–94 development plan, which emphasises that the growth of tourism should not be at the expense of the environment, the number of beds on the islands of Mahé, Praslin, and La Digue is to be limited to 4,000. Increases in total capacity are to be achieved by developing the outer islands. To avoid future threat to the natural attractions of the islands, 150,000 tourists per year are regarded as the ultimate ceiling. The higher cost of accommodations and travel, deficiencies in services and maintenance of facilities, and a limited range of diversions handicap Seychelles in attracting vacationers at the expense of other Indian Ocean tourist destinations.

In 2011, Prince William and Princess Catherine Middleton spent their honeymoon in Seychelles.

Since the royal honeymoon in 2011, Seychelles has received a drastic transformation from a primarily European market into an expanded high value sector. Despite disruptions from the 2020 COVID-19 pandemic the tourism industry received significant overall growth. In recent years, the annual visitor rate of Seychelles has increased from 200,000 to 350,000 with revenues and foreign exchange of tourism driving roughly $1.085 billion into the nations GDP, supplying just over half of the Country's overall GDP.

In recent years, Seychelles has increasingly presented itself as a high-end, luxury destination, similar to that of the Maldives. The focus is on attracting more low-volume, high yield tourists, to increase the measure in popularity, rather than budget travellers, with the average visitor spending over $15,000 per trip, close to the average GDP per capita of the country, $16,586.

== Statistics ==
Yearly tourist arrivals in thousands

The direct contribution of the tourism sector to GDP was estimated at 50 per cent, and it provides about 70 per cent of total foreign exchange earnings. Although difficult to measure, the import content of tourism expenditures is high, so net tourism earnings are significantly lower. 130,046 tourist arrivals were recorded in 2000, including over 104,000 from Europe. In the same year, Seychelles had 2,479 hotel rooms with 5,010 beds filled to 52% capacity. Tourist income was US$112 million in 1999. In 2002, the US Department of State estimated the average daily cost of staying in Seychelles at $246 per day. According to the National Bureau of Statistics, 230,272 tourists visited Seychelles in 2013 compared to 208,034 in 2012.

Most visitors in the Seychelles were from the following countries of nationality:

Country	2016	2015
France	43,066	43,370
Germany	39,488	35,895
United Arab Emirates	24,091	21,178
Italy	22,845	21,704
United Kingdom	18,885	16,572
China	14,549	13,941
South Africa	12,354	13,375
Switzerland	12,333	11,499
Russia	11,465	12,222
India	10,916	7,718
Total	303,177	276,233

No.	Country	2023	No.	Country	2022	No.	Country	2021	No.	Country	2020	No.	Country	2019	No.	Country	2018
1	Germany	54,925	1	Germany	44,626	1	Russia	31,392	1	Germany	24,069	1	Germany	72,509	1	Germany	61,339
2	France	42,410	2	France	44,393	2	UAE	21,699	2	Israel	12,488	2	France	43,297	2	France	43,549
3	Russia	38,172	3	Russia	30,573	3	France	18,425	3	France	12,006	3	UK	29,872	3	UK	26,671
4	UK	19,870	4	UK	21,583	4	Germany	17,673	4	UK	7,337	4	Italy	27,289	4	UAE	25,024
5	Italy	19,559	5	Italy	18,394	5	Israel	10,551	5	UAE	7,097	5	UAE	24,609	5	Italy	24,409
6	UAE	16,410	6	UAE	16,918	6	Switzerland	8,486	6	Russia	5,161	6	Switzerland	15,300	6	India	13,901
7	Switzerland	14,696	7	Israel	15,880	7	USA	5,551	7	Switzerland	4,604	7	India	14,338	7	Switzerland	13,394
8	Israel	12,945	8	Switzerland	15,217	8	Ukraine	5,526	8	India	2,898	8	Russia	12,403	8	South Africa	12,399
9	USA	9,979	9	South Africa	9,185	9	Poland	5,100	9	South Africa	2,892	9	South Africa	11,909	9	Russia	11,362
10	South Africa	9,411	10	USA	9,159	10	Saudi Arabia	4,327	10	Italy	2,884	10	USA	10,870	10	Austria	10,359
11	Austria	8,246	11	Austria	8,124	11	Austria	4,068	11	USA	2,675	11	Austria	8,989	11	USA	9,810
12	India	7,602	12	Poland	6,871	12	Italy	3,313	12	Austria	2,456	12	Poland	6,487	12	China	9,050
13	Poland	6,432	13	Hungary	5,134	13	Qatar	3,298	13	Czech Republic	1,872	13	China	5,973	13	Reunion	6,203
14	Czech Republic	5,428	14	Czech Republic	5,015	14	Czech Republic	3,280	14	Reunion	1,585	14	Reunion	5,791	14	Israel	4,814
15	Spain	4,108	15	India	4,957	15	UK	3,230	15	China	1,373	15	Czech Republic	5,553	15	Poland	4,731
16	Reunion	4,073	16	Spain	4,374	16	Spain	3,137	16	Poland	1,300	16	Israel	5,185	16	Spain	4,547
17	Belgium	3,880	17	Belgium	4,151	17	Belgium	2,933	17	Netherlands	761	17	Spain	4,528	17	Czech Republic	4,269
18	Hungary	3,842	18	Romania	3,992	18	Romania	2,554	18	Qatar	708	18	Qatar	4,298	18	Qatar	3,935
19	Romania	3,566	19	Netherlands	3,610	19	Hungary	2,318	19	Mauritius	683	19	Mauritius	4,144	19	Sweden	3,918
20	Netherlands	3,513	20	Reunion	3,533	20	Nigeria	1,610	20	Spain	647	20	Netherlands	3,669	20	Netherlands	3,795
	Other	61,812		Other	56,379		Other	24,378		Other	19,362		Other	67,191		Other	64,365
	Total	350,879		Total	332,068		Total	182,849		Total	114,858		Total	384,204		Total	361,844

== Tourist attraction sites ==
- Anse Intendance, Mahé
- Anse Lazio, Praslin
- Anse Source d'Argent, La Digue
- Baie Lazare, Mahé
- La Digue Island
- Curieuse Island
- Morne Seychellois National Park
- Ste Anne National Marine Park
- Beau Vallon Beach
- Anse Volbert
- Vallée de Mai National Park, Praslin
- Cousin Island
- Aride Island Nature Reserve
- Silhouette Island
- Victoria, Mahé
- Bird Island
- Aldabra Atoll
- Anse Royal, Mahé
- Anse Cachee, Mahé
- Takamaka Bay Beach

== See also ==
- Visa policy of Seychelles
- Culture of Seychelles
