= Marie-Celine Zialor =

Seychellois politician

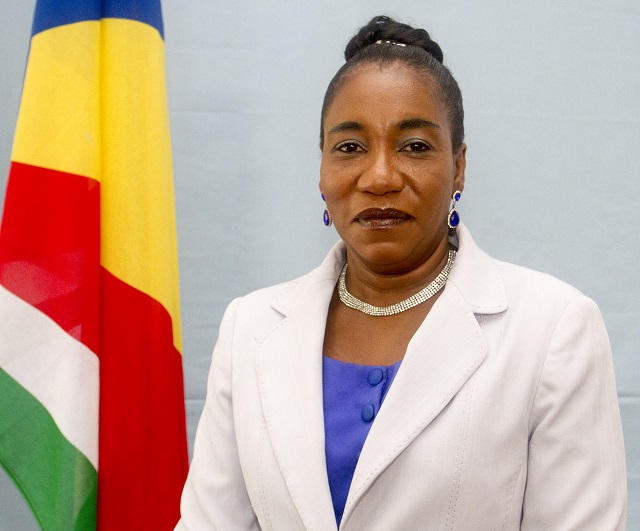

Minister of Youth, Sports and Family Affairs
- In office 31 October 2020 – 28 October 2025

Personal details
- Party: United Seychelles

Marie-Celine Zialor is a Seychelles politician who served as Minister of Youth, Sports and Family Affairs.

== Education ==
Zialor holds a diploma in applied biology from Australia and taught biology and chemistry in secondary schools before being promoted to deputy headteacher. She was previously known for her lectures.

== Political career ==
In 2020, President Wavel Ramkalawan appointed her to his Cabinet. She was given the portfolio of youth, sports and family affairs. She aid that Seychelles would can become a hub in the region for advocating gender equality. As minister she emphasised the government's commitment to protecting the rights of persons with disabilities. She also met with interfaith groups promoting religious pluralism. She released messages to mark International Men's Day and International Women's Day. Internationally, she met with the Zimbabwean Women's Parliamentary Caucus.
