= Ministry of Foreign Affairs (Seychelles) =

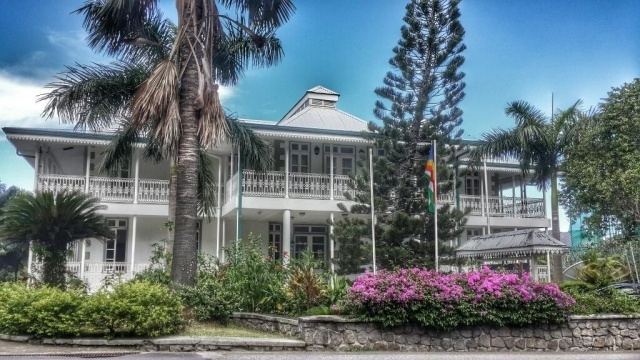
Ministry of Foreign Affairs of Seychelles

The Ministry of Foreign Affairs of the Republic of Seychelles is the Seychelles' foreign affairs ministry. The ministry is located in Mont Fleuri, Mahé, Seychelles. The current minister is Sylvestre Radegonde.

The ministry has several sections and divisions, including: the Principal Secretary's Secretariat (Bureau du Secretaire General); the International Relations Division (Division des Relations Internationales); the Protocol, Treaties and Consular Affairs Division (Division du Protocole, des Traités et Affaires consulaires); the Protocol Section (Service du Protocole); the Development and Regional Integration Division (Division du Développement et de L'intégration Régionale); and the Administration and Finance Division (Division de L'administration et des Finances).

== See also ==
- Minister for Foreign Affairs (Seychelles)
