= Peggy Vidot =

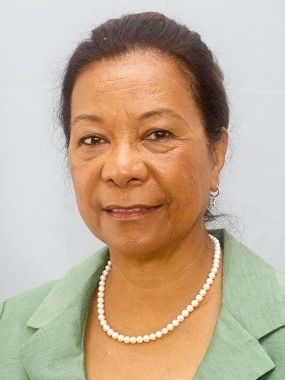

Minister of Health
- In office 3 November 2020 – 26 October 2025
- President: Wavel Ramkalawan
- Preceded by: Jean-Paul Adam
- Succeeded by: Marvin Fanny

Personal details
- Born: Peggy Antoinette Vidot; 1958–59
- Occupation: Nurse, midwife

Peggy Antoinette Vidot (born 1958–59) is a Seychellois nurse and midwife. Vidot served as Minister of Health from 2020 to 2025.

== Biography ==
Vidot is a registered midwife from the Luton and Dunstable School of Midwifery, and a registered nurse from the Bath School of Nursing. She graduated with a master's degree in health services management from the University of Manchester.

In 1977, she started her career as a nurse instructor at the School of Nursing in Seychelles. In 2003, she was appointed Health Advisor for the Commonwealth Secretariat in London. Upon her return to Seychelles in 2012, she was appointed Special Advisor to the Minister for Health, and served until 2016.

Vidot is the chairperson of the National Aids Council in Seychelles, and was a proponent of switching HIV treatment tasks from doctors to nurses and midwives to better combat the disease in Africa. In order to enable the switching, she initiated the African Health Profession Regulatory Collaborative (ARC) together with Patricia Riley of the CDC, as a framework to strengthen nursing and midwifery education. In 2011, ARC was established and has been implemented in 17 nations as of 2016.

On 29 October 2020, Vidot was elected Minister of Health, succeeding Jean-Paul Adam. and was sworn in on 3 November 2020.
