= Anse Intendance =

Beach in Mahé island, Seychelles

Coordinates: 4°47′03″S 55°30′01″E

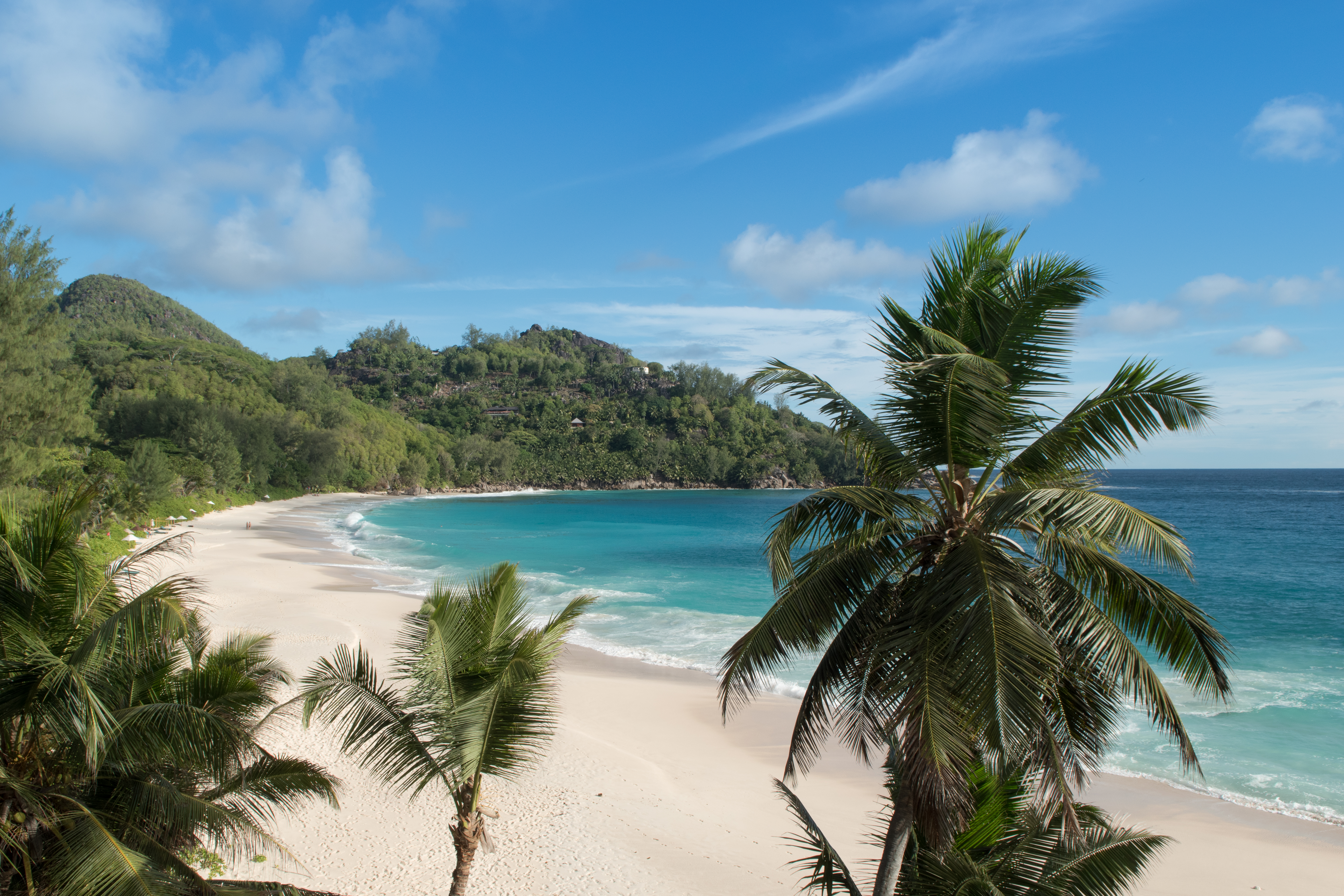
- View point Anse Intendance beach Mahe Seychelles View point Anse Intendance beach in Mahé island of Seychelles, 2017
- Location: Mahé, Seychelles
- Coast: Indian Ocean
- Type: Rural, natural sandy beach
- Demarcated: 2009; 16 years ago
- Total length: 1.2 km (0.75 mi)
- Maximum width: 50 m (160 ft)
- Orientation: West-Southwest
- Notable landmarks: Banyan Tree Seychelles
- Governing authority: Seychelles National Parks Authority

Anse Intendance is a beach situated in the southwest coast of Mahé island, Seychelles.

== Location ==
The beach is situated in the Takamaka district of the island, roughly 30 km from the capital city, Victoria.

To reach Anse Intendance from the West Coast Road, also known as Latanier Road, head south towards the South Coast Road (Route 5) until you reach the Quatre Bornes police station. From the East Coast Road, also known as Grand Anse Road, drive south until you reach the same police junction. From the Quatre Bornes police station, take the 1.7 km concrete road to the beach.

== Flora and fauna ==
The beach is a significant nesting site for Hawksbill sea turtles (Eretmochelys imbricata). In 2006, Cyclone Bondo caused severe erosion, destroying nearly 90% of the turtle nests at Intendance.

In 2021, the Marine Conservation Society Seychelles proposed designating Anse Intendance as a protected area on Mahé Island to safeguard hawksbill sea turtles during their nesting season, from September 1 to March 31.

== In media ==
- In 2018, CNN listed this beach among the best in Seychelles.
- In 2024, The Times listed this beach at number 4 out of the 14 best beaches in Seychelles.
