= Sylvestre Radegonde =

Seychellois diplomat and politician

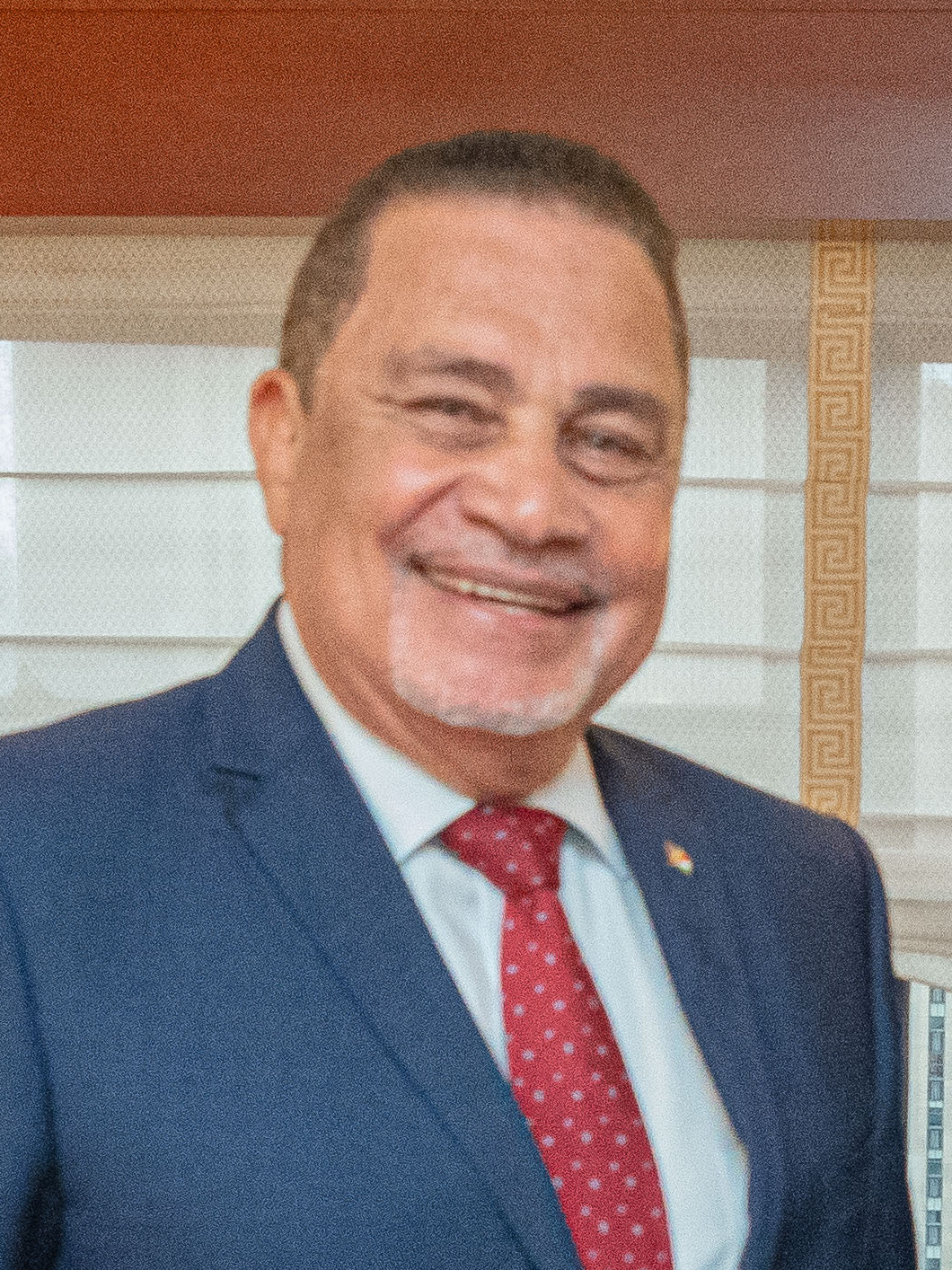
- Radegonde in 2023

Minister for Foreign Affairs and Tourism
- In office 3 November 2020 – 26 October 2025
- President: Wavel Ramkalawan
- Preceded by: Vincent Meriton (Foreign Affairs); Didier Dogley (Tourism)
- Succeeded by: Barry Faure (Foreign Affairs); Amanda Bernstein (Tourism)

Personal details
- Born: Louis Sylvestre Radegonde; 16 March 1956 (age 70) Seychelles
- Occupation: Diplomat, politician

Louis Sylvestre Radegonde (born 16 March 1956) is a Seychellois diplomat and politician. Radegonde served as the Minister for Foreign Affairs and Tourism from 2020 to 2025. Prior to his appointment as Minister, Radegonde had served as high commissioner and ambassador to a multitude of countries.

== Biography ==
Radegonde started his diplomatic career in 1976. He served as High Commissioner to the United Kingdom, Malaysia and Ambassador to Belgium. In 2005, Radegonde joined the office of President, and became CEO of the Tourist Office. In 2007, he started to work for the DHL Clinical Trials Logistics.

In 2017, Radegonde was appointed Ambassador to France. In 2018, he was also appointed as non-resident Ambassador to Monaco, and in 2019 appointed non-resident Ambassador to Russia as well.

On 3 November 2020, it was announced that Radegonde was appointed Minister of Foreign Affairs and Tourism, and was sworn in after his COVID-19 quarantine on 16 November 2020.
