= Myriam Telemaque =

Seychellois politician

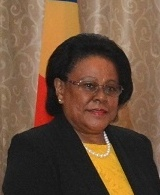

Minister of Employment, Immigration and Civil Status
- In office 7 July 2017 – 3 November 2020
- President: Danny Faure
- Succeeded by: Errol Fonseka

Personal details
- Born: Mont Fleuri, Mahé, Seychelles
- Party: People's Party
- Occupation: Politician

Myriam Telemaque is a Seychellois politician who served as Seychelles' Minister of Employment, Immigration and Civil Status from 7 July 2017 until 3 November 2020. Prior to her appointment, she had served as principal secretary for Immigration and Civil Status and chief immigration officer in the Department of Immigration under the Ministry of Affairs.
