= Barry Faure =

Seychellois diplomat and politician

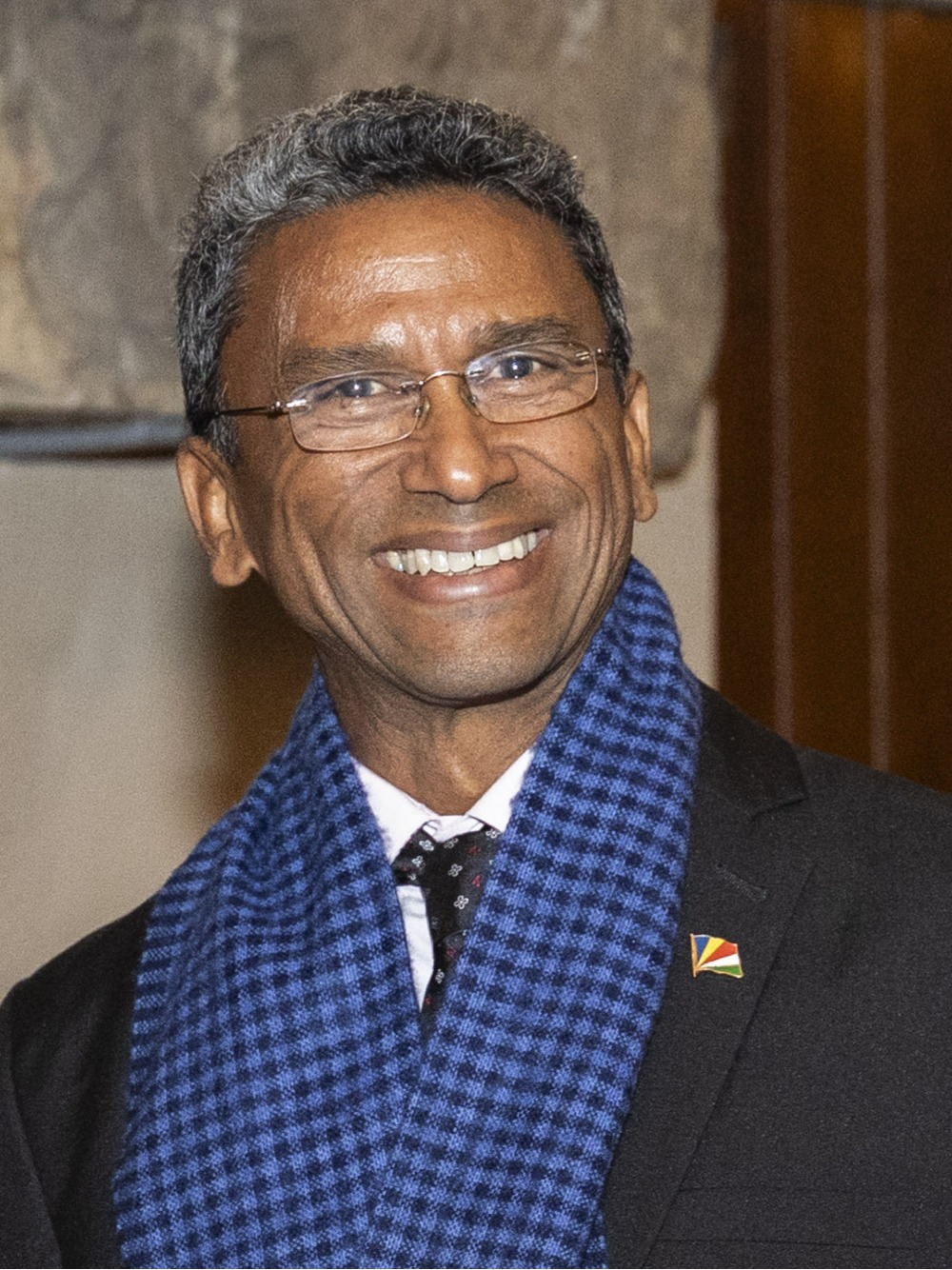
- Faure in 2025

Minister for Foreign Affairs and Diaspora
- Incumbent
- Assumed office 6 November 2025
- President: Patrick Herminie
- Preceded by: Sylvestre Radegonde

Personal details
- Born: 27 July 1964 (age 61) Victoria, Seychelles
- Relations: Danny Faure
- Occupation: Diplomat, politician

Barry Jude Jean Faure (born 27 July 1964) is a Seychellois diplomat and politician. Faure is serving as the Minister for Foreign Affairs and Diaspora since 2025. Prior to his appointment as Minister, Faure had served as ambassador to a multitude of countries.

Faure was elected in 1993 to the National Assembly for Anse Royale.
