= Maxime Ferrari =

Seychellois politician (1930–2021)

Dr. Maxime Ferrari KSS, OBE
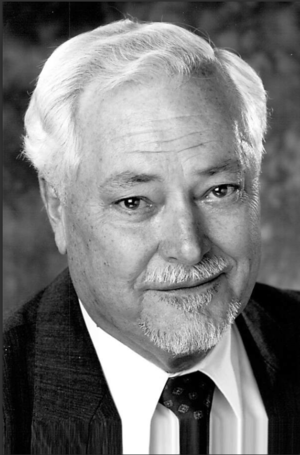
- Born: Jean Désiré Maxime Ferrari; 27 January 1930; Mahé, Seychelles
- Died: 29 June 2021 (aged 91)
- Education: University College Cork
- Occupations: Obstetrician; Politician
- Years active: Medicine, 1955–1974; Politics, 1974–1990
- Spouse: Ginette Nageon de L'Estang
- Children: Marie-Antoinette Ferrari; Cécile Ferrari; Jean-François Ferrari; Pauline Ferrari; André-Michel Ferrari

Dr Jean Désiré Maxime Ferrari, KSS, OBE (French pronunciation: [dʒin deziʁe mæksim ferˈraːri; 27 January 1930 – 29 June 2021) was a politician and former obstetrician who held several different positions in the government of the Seychelles. He was widely regarded as an activist against corrupt governmental practices and a champion of human rights and democracy in the African island nations of the Indian Ocean.

He was most recognised for his role as a Founding Father of the Indian Ocean Commission (La Commission de l'Océan Indien), an intergovernmental organisation designed to strengthen the relationship between the five African Indian Ocean nations, the Seychelles, Mauritius, Comoros, Madagascar and Réunion (an overseas region of France).

In 1985, he became the Regional Representative and Director of the Regional Office for Africa of the United Nations Environment Programme.

== Early life and medical career ==
Maxime Ferrari was born on 27 January 1930, on the largest of the Seychellois islands, Mahé. He left Seychelles for the first time in July 1949, on board the SS Karanja, a British India steamer, to travel to Europe via Bombay.

After attending primary and secondary school in the islands, he went to study medicine at University College, Cork and qualified M.B., B.Ch., B.A.O.(National University of Ireland) in 1955.

His first three medical positions were based in Northampton, before he returned to Seychelles in 1957. Here, he practised mostly obstetrics and gynaecology until 1975. During this time, he founded and presided over a number of social, cultural and development organisations. In Seychelles, he was decorated for services rendered to the community. In 1972, he was also made a Knight of the Order of St. Sylvester by the Pope, Paul VI, for services rendered to the Church and in 1976, he received an OBE.

Upon his return to Seychelles, he worked in both the Baie Sainte Anne cottage hospital and the local ward situated on the island of La Digue. Once a week, he would travel to Curieuse Island to tend to an isolated population who were suffering from Hansen's disease (leprosy). Dr Ferrari was the only Medical Officer on Praslin who spent time there. He accompanied the only British Minister to visit these islands, John Profumo, in 1957. Together they took time to visit the lepers isolated on Curieuse Island. For his care and devotion to the lepers, Dr Ferrari was commended.

Due to his work as an obstetrician to the majority of the Seychellois population, he was responsible for the delivery of 16,000 babies across a career spanning 16 years.

== Seychellois politics ==
He entered politics and the struggle for Seychellois independence in 1974 and soon became Vice-President of the Seychelles Peoples United Party, which reformed into the Seychelles People's Progressive Front (Seychellois Creole: Parti Lepep, PL). This later became known as the People's Party, and now most recently, United Seychelles.

During this period, he was an ambassador for the Republic of the Seychelles at the Franco-African Summit in 1981. In 1983 he also represented Seychelles at the Organisation of African Unity Summit in Addis Ababa, the Commonwealth Heads of State Meeting in New Delhi, and the United Nations General Assembly in New York. He was also heavily involved in the negotiations and signing of the Lomé II and Lomé III Conventions.

From 1975 to 1977 he served as Minister of Labour and Social Security. On 5 June 1977, he was involved in the launch of a coup against the president of the Seychelles James Mancham led by Albert René. This occurred less than one year after independence. From then on he continued to serve as Minister of Agriculture and Land Use (1977–1978), then Minister of Planning and Development (1978–1982) and finally Minister of Planning and External Relations (1982–1984) until he resigned in 1984 due to disillusionment with politics.

== United Nations and the environment ==
After leaving Seychellois politics, Maxime Ferrari joined the United Nations Organisation and held the post of Regional Representative and Director of the Regional Office for Africa of UNEP. Posted in Nairobi, Kenya, he travelled widely in Africa and elsewhere. In this capacity he attended the African Ministerial Conference on the Environment (AMCEN) held in Cairo in December 1985 and acted as Head of the Conference up until his retirement. In collaboration with UNECA, he organised the African Regional Conference on Environment and Sustainable Development held in Kampala, Uganda, in June 1989. His work involved organising a wide range of workshops on the topic of environmental management.

He retired in 1990, founded the Seychelles Institute for Democracy, and made a contribution to the return of multi-party democracy in the country.

== After politics ==
Since retiring from UNEP in 1990, Dr Ferrari devoted his time to the creation of socially democratic organisations with support that he garnered from groups within Seychelles and abroad. These organisations were designed to ensure the maintenance of democracy and pluralism in Seychelles. He founded the Rally of the People of Seychelles for Democracy (RPSD), the Seychelles Institute for Democracy (SID) and was the Chairman of the United Democratic Movement in the Seychelles.

He published numerous articles on the environment and lectured to scientific communities on environmental policies, as well as on the conservation of endangered species.

== Personal life ==
In 1955 Maxime Ferrari married Ginette Nageon de Lestang. He has five children, Marie-Antoinette, Cécile, Jean-François, Pauline, and André-Michel. His eldest son, Jean-François, is serving as a member of the National assembly of seychelles, representing the LDS (Linyon Demokratik Seselwa).

He identified himself as Roman Catholic, and was elected as the first president of the Union Chrétienne Seychelloise, an organisation designed to promote cultural, moral and Christian values.

In 1999, at the behest of his two eldest children, he published an autobiography, entitled 'Sunshine and Shadows, A Personal Story'.

At the time of his death in June 2021 he was in the process of writing a new book with excerpts of his various speeches concerning issues such as democracy and the environment, as well as a range of social, political and cultural themes.

He was the grandfather of British Liberal Democrat campaigner and EU policy specialist, Blaise Baquiche. Formerly an adviser to the Conservative Party in the European Parliament, Blaise left the party in 2017 to join the Lib Dems.

== Positions held ==
University Education

- 1949–55 Medical College, Cork, National University of Ireland
- 1955–57 Northampton General Hospital, Northampton, UK
- 1960 Royal Postgraduate Medical School, London, UK

Medical Career

- 1957–60 General Practitioner, Seychelles Hospital
- 1961–63 Obstetrics/gynecology, Seychelles Hospital

Political Career

- 1961–1974 Founder member and first president of the Union Chrétienne Seychelloise
- 1963–1974 Co-founder and President of the Société du Logement
- 1974–77, 1978–81, 1981–84 Elected member of the Central Committee and Vice-President of the Seychelles People's United Party
- 1975–1977 Minister of Labour and Social Security
- 1977–1978 Minister of Agriculture and Land Use
- 1978–1982 Minister of Planning and Development
- 1982–1984 Minister of Planning and External Relations
- 1985 Regional Representative and Director of the Regional Office for Africa of UNEP
- 1991 Chairman of the Rally of the People of Seychelles for Democracy (RPSD), the Seychelles Institute for Democracy (SID) and the United Democratic Movement

== Awards ==
- 1971 Croix d'Or de l'Union Chrétienne Seychelloise
- 1972 Chevalier de l'Ordre de St. Sylvester Pape
- 1976 Officer of the Most Excellent Order of the British Empire

== Publications ==
- Sunshine and Shadows: A Personal Story, Minerva press, London.
