= Didier Dogley =

Seychellois politician

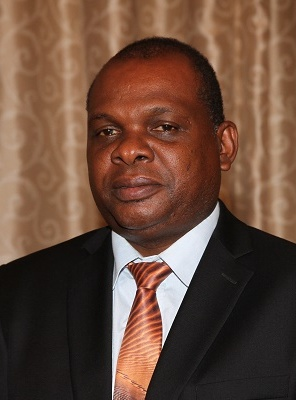

Minister of Environment, Energy and Climate Change
- In office 7 July 2017 – 26 April 2018
- President: Danny Faure

Minister of Tourism, Civil Aviation, Ports and Marine
- In office 27 April 2018 – 30 October 2020
- President: Danny Faure
- Succeeded by: Sylvestre Radegonde

Personal details
- Born: 1964 (age 61–62)
- Occupation: politician

Didier Dogley (born 1964) is a Seychellois politician who served as the Minister of Tourism, Civil Aviation, Ports & Marine. from 27 April 2018 until 3 November 2020.

He graduated from the Erfurt School of Horticulture (now Erfurt University of Applied Sciences) in Germany in 1989.

Dogley was previously Minister of Environment, Energy and Climate Change.
