= Jean-François Ferrari =

Seychellois politician

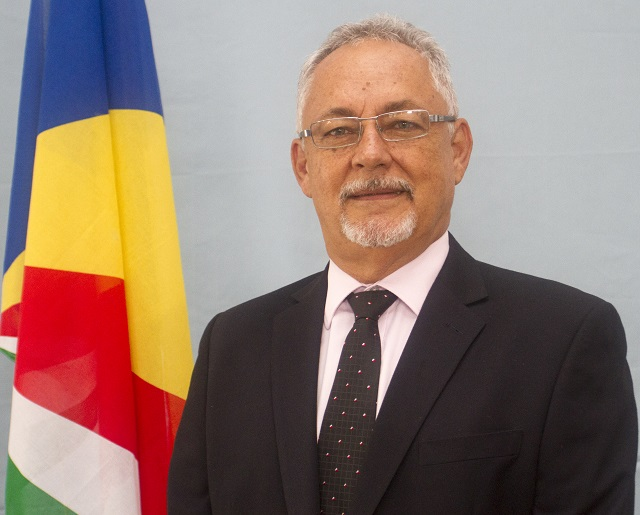

Designated Minister and Minister of Fisheries
- In office 3 November 2020 – 26 October 2025
- President: Wavel Ramkalawan
- Preceded by: Macsuzy Mondon (Designated minister); Charles Bastienne (Fisheries)
- Succeeded by: unknown (Designated minister); Wallace Cosgrow (Fisheries)

Personal details
- Born: Jean-François Gabriel Ferrari; 1959 or 1960
- Political party: Seychelles National Party
- Occupation: Journalist, politician

Jean-François Gabriel Ferrari (born 1959 or 1960) is a Seychellois politician member of the National Assembly of Seychelles. On 3 November 2020, he was sworn in as Designated Minister and Minister of Fisheries.

== Biography ==
Ferrari studied sociology and political economy at Aix-Marseille University in Aix-en-Provence. He is journalist by profession and was the co-editor of the Regar newspaper for 20 years. In 1977, he was a participant in the coup d'état which he later regretted. In 1991, he joined Roger Mancienne and Wavel Ramkalawan to form the underground Parti Seselwa.

He is a member of the Seychelles National Party, and was first directly elected to the Assembly in 2007 after being proportionally elected in 1998.

In 2006, he was injured during a demonstration against the government's monopoly on radio and television. In 2009, he was again injured during a demonstration.

In 2016, Ferrari was elected to the National Assembly for the Mont Fleuri district, and served until 2020. On 31 October 2020, Ferrari was elected Designated Minister and Minister of Fisheries, succeeding Macsuzy Mondon.
