= Mitcy Larue =

Seychellois politician

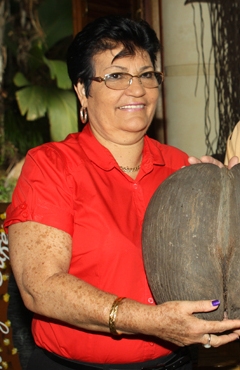
- Occupation: Politician

Mitcy Larue is a member of the National Assembly of Seychelles. A teacher by profession, she is a member of the Seychelles People's Progressive Front, and was first elected to the Assembly in 1993. She served as the Minister of Family from 2018 until 2020.
