= Joel Morgan =

Seychellois politician

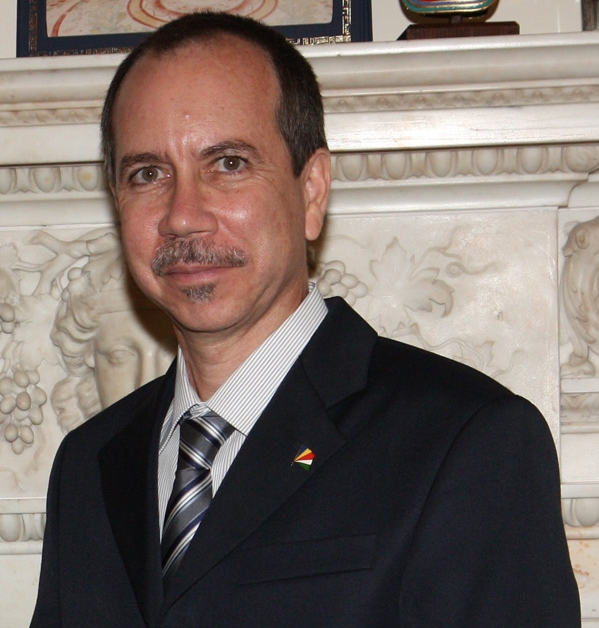
- Born: 15 August 1961 (age 64)
- Occupation: Politician

Joel Morgan (born 15 August 1961) is a Seychellois politician and has been the Minister of Foreign Affairs and Transport since 2015. He has served as Minister of Home Affairs since 2010. The Office of the President has today announced the appointment of Mr. Joel Morgan as National Security Advisor to the President.

Mr. Morgan is an Electronics and Computer Engineer by profession and holds a Master of Engineering degree in Electronics and Electrical Engineering from Heriot-Watt University in Edinburgh, Scotland.

He has previously served in Government in several senior roles, including as Cabinet Minister responsible for portfolios such as Home Affairs, Foreign Affairs, Maritime Security, Transport, Environment and Energy, Natural Resources, Land Use and Habitat, and Education and Human Resource Development.

Earlier in his career, he served as Principal Secretary in the Ministries of Land Use and Habitat and Industries and International Business, and as Director General of the Seychelles Bureau of Standards.

Mr. Morgan has also served on the boards of several national institutions, including Air Seychelles, the Seychelles National Oil Company, the Housing Finance Company, and the Seychelles Housing Development Corporation.

He has also represented Seychelles in a number of international technical and policy forums related to national and international security, energy, technology, and environmental management.

In recent years, he has been engaged in the private sector as a business owner in the electronics and telecommunications sector.

In his role as National Security Advisor, Mr. Morgan will provide strategic advice to the President and support coordination on national security matters across relevant government agencies.
