= Demographics of Seychelles =

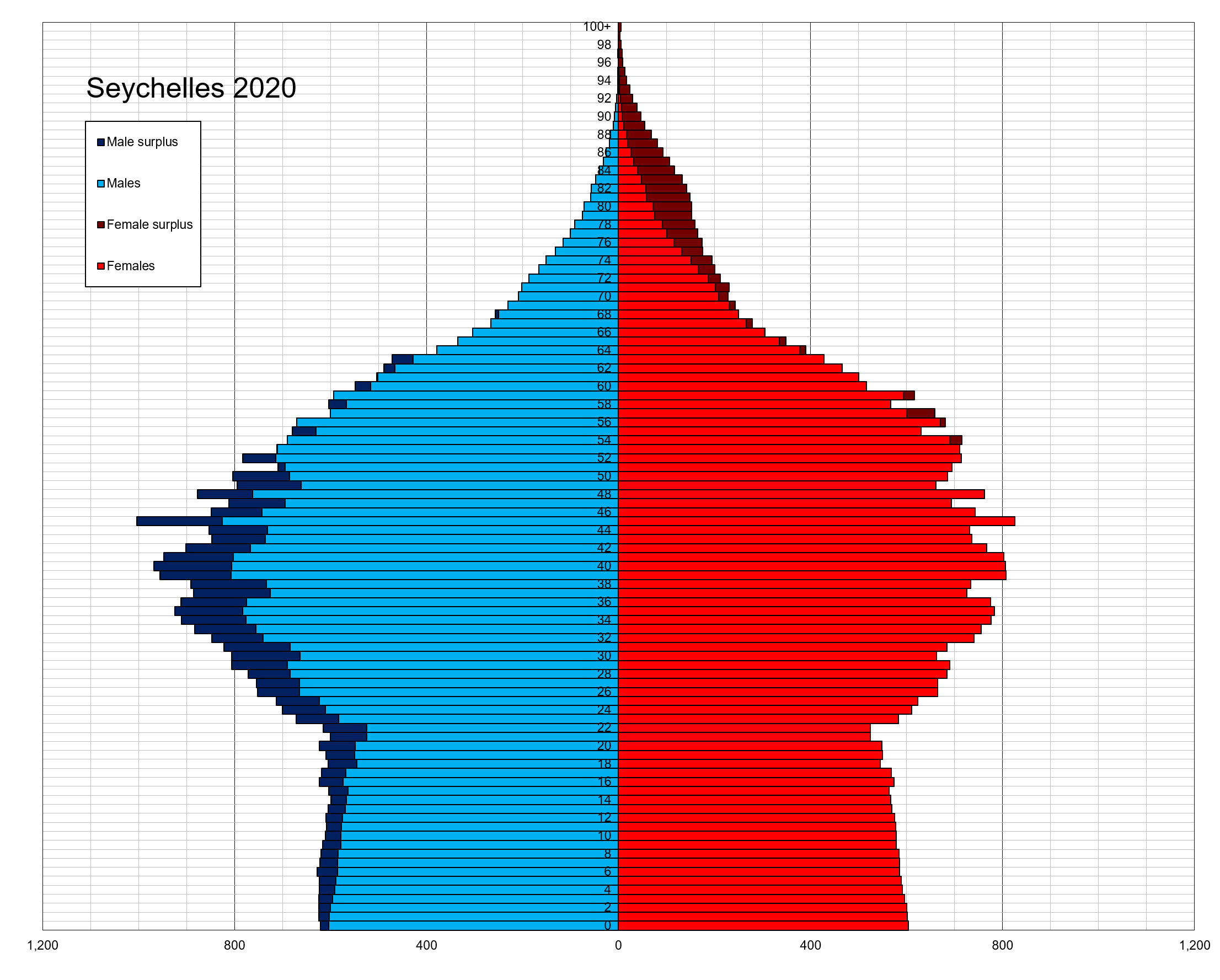
- Population pyramid of the Seychelles in 2020
- Population: 97,017 (2022 est.)
- Growth rate: 0.64% (2022 est.)
- Birth rate: 12.37 births/1,000 population (2022 est.)
- Death rate: 6.88 deaths/1,000 population (2022 est.)
- Net migration rate: 0.86 migrant(s)/1,000 population (2022 est.)
- Immigrant share: 10.2% (2024)

Age structure
- 0–14 years: 18.85%
- 65 and over: 8.27%

Nationality
- Nationality: Seychellois

Language
- Official: Seychellois Creole, English, French

Demographic features of the population of Seychelles include population density, ethnicity, religious affiliations and other aspects of the population.

Seychelles has no indigenous population and was first permanently settled by a small group of French colonists, Africans, and South Indians in 1770. Seychelles' modern population is composed of the descendants of French and later British colonizers, Africans, and Indian, Chinese, and Middle Eastern traders and is concentrated on three of its 155 islands – the vast majority on Mahe and lesser numbers on Praslin and La Digue. Seychelles' population grew rapidly during the second half of the 20th century, largely due to natural increase, but the pace has slowed because of fertility decline. The total fertility rate dropped sharply from 4.0 children per woman in 1980 to 1.9 in 2015, mainly as a result of a family planning program, free education and health care, and increased female labour force participation. Life expectancy has increased steadily, but women on average live 9 years longer than men, a difference that is higher than that typical of developed countries.

Most Seychellois are descendants of early French settlers and East Africans who arrived in the 19th century. Tamils, along with other South Indians and Chinese (1.1% of the population) account for the other permanent inhabitants. About 1,703 (2000) expatriates live and work in Seychelles. In 1901, there were roughly 3,500 Tamil speakers out of the country's population of 19,237. Tamil immigrants arrived in Seychelles as early as 1770 and were among the first settlers to the originally sparsely inhabited island nation.

Seychelles culture is a mixture of French and African (Creole) influences. The local Seychellois Creole (Kreol), a creole language derived from French and African tongues, is the native language of 91.8% of the people; but English and French are also commonly used. English remains the language of government and commerce.

About 90% of the Seychellois people live on the island of Mahé. Most of the rest live on Praslin and La Digue, with the remaining smaller islands either sparsely populated or uninhabited.

The combination of reduced fertility and increased longevity has resulted in an ageing population, which will put pressure on the government's provision of pensions and health care. Seychelles' sustained investment in social welfare services, such as free primary health care and education up to the post-secondary level, have enabled the country to achieve a high human development index score, among the highest in Africa.

== Population ==
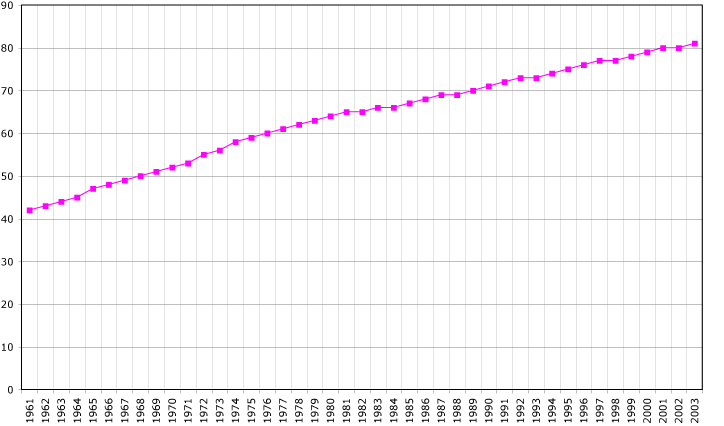
Demographics of Seychelles, Data of FAO, year 2005; Number of inhabitants in thousands.

Census population and growth rate
Year	Pop.	±% p.a.
1901	19,237	—
1911	22,691	+1.67%
1921	24,523	+0.78%
1931	27,444	+1.13%
1947	34,632	+1.46%
1960	41,425	+1.39%
1971	53,096	+2.28%
1977	61,898	+2.59%
1987	68,598	+1.03%
1994	74,331	+1.15%
2002	80,755	+1.04%
2010	90,945	+1.50%
2022	102,612	+1.01%

=== Structure of the population ===
Population Estimates by Sex and Age Group (01.VII.2013):

Age group	Male	Female	Total	%
Total	44 735	45 214	89 949	100
0–4	3 777	3 631	7 408	8.24
5–9	3 179	3 215	6 394	7.11
10–14	3 131	2 952	6 083	6.76
15–19	3 411	3 187	6 598	7.34
20–24	3 393	2 844	6 237	6.93
25–29	3 609	3 473	7 082	7.87
30–34	3 751	3 681	7 432	8.26
35–39	3 529	3 693	7 222	8.03
40–44	3 656	3 536	7 192	8.00
45–49	3 371	3 628	6 999	7.78
50–54	3 162	3 153	6 315	7.02
55–59	2 473	2 351	4 824	5.36
60–64	1 459	1 604	3 063	3.41
65–69	1 106	1 193	2 299	2.56
70–74	789	999	1 788	1.99
75–79	468	890	1 358	1.51
80–84	286	634	920	1.02
85–89	141	349	490	0.54
90–94	37	152	189	0.21
95–99	6	44	50	0.06
100+	1	5	6	0.01
Age group	Male	Female	Total	Percent
0–14	10 087	9 798	19 885	22.11
15–64	31 814	31 150	62 964	70.00
65+	2 834	4 266	7 100	7.89

Population Estimates by Sex and Age Group (01.VII.2020):

Age group	Male	Female	Total	%
Total	50 061	48 401	98 462	100
0–4	4 068	3 869	7 937	8.06
5–9	3 952	3 679	7 631	7.75
10–14	2 761	2 610	5 371	5.45
15–19	2 441	2 642	5 083	5.16
20–24	1 630	1 344	2 974	3.02
25–29	3 013	2 170	5 183	5.26
30–34	3 790	2 615	6 405	6.51
35–39	4 986	4 363	9 349	9.50
40–44	3 724	3 552	7 276	7.39
45–49	4 294	3 944	8 238	8.37
50–54	3 124	3 632	6 756	6.86
55–59	4 010	4 529	8 539	8.67
60–64	3 219	3 312	6 531	6.63
65–69	2 439	2 454	4 893	4.97
70–74	1 352	1 431	2 783	2.83
75–79	768	917	1 685	1.71
80–84	331	671	1 002	1.02
85–89	134	455	589	0.60
90+	25	212	237	0.24
Age group	Male	Female	Total	Percent
0–14	10 781	10 158	20 939	21.27
15–64	34 231	32 103	66 334	67.37
65+	5 049	6 140	11 189	11.36

== Vital statistics ==
	Population	Live births	Deaths	Natural change	Crude birth rate (per 1000)	Crude death rate (per 1000)	Natural change (per 1000)	TFR
1950	36,000	1,061	418	643	29.5	11.6	17.9	
1951	34,000	1,033	425	608	30.4	12.5	17.9	
1952	36,000	1,037	456	581	28.8	12.7	16.1	
1953	37,000	1,169	438	731	31.6	11.8	19.8	
1954	37,000	1,209	457	752	32.7	12.4	20.3	
1955	39,000	1,303	456	847	33.4	11.7	21.7	
1956	38,000	1,458	468	990	38.4	12.3	26.1	
1957	38,000	1,534	424	1,110	40.4	11.2	29.2	
1958	39,000	1,553	450	1,103	39.8	11.5	28.3	
1959	40,000	1,595	421	1,174	39.9	10.5	29.4	
1960	42,000	1,714	450	1,264	40.8	10.7	30.1	
1961	43,000	1,775	574	1,201	41.3	13.3	27.9	
1962	44,000	1,733	504	1,229	39.4	11.5	27.9	
1963	45,000	1,855	513	1,342	41.2	11.4	29.8	
1964	46,000	1,867	485	1,382	40.6	10.5	30.0	
1965	47,000	1,772	563	1,209	37.7	12.0	25.7	
1966	47,000	1,895	515	1,380	40.3	11.0	29.4	
1967	48,000	1,827	536	1,291	38.1	11.2	26.9	
1968	49,000	1,738	538	1,200	35.5	11.0	24.5	
1969	51,000	1,715	561	1,154	33.6	11.0	22.6	
1970	52,000	1,660	437	1,223	31.9	8.4	23.5	
1971	54,695	1,837	464	1,373	34.7	8.8	25.9	
1972	56,029	1,723	529	1,194	31.3	9.6	21.7	
1973	56,892	1,639	475	1,164	29.3	8.5	20.8	
1974	57,937	1,860	497	1,363	32.6	8.7	23.9	
1975	59,292	1,806	433	1,373	30.6	7.3	23.3	
1976	60,504	1,642	466	1,176	26.9	7.6	19.3	
1977	61,786	1,599	477	1,122	25.8	7.7	18.1	
1978	62,150	1,796	466	1,330	29.0	7.5	21.5	
1979	62,686	1,730	438	1,292	27.5	7.0	20.5	
1980	63,261	1,830	444	1,386	29.0	7.0	22.0	
1981	64,035	1,802	442	1,360	28.2	6.9	21.3	
1982	64,413	1,552	482	1,070	24.3	7.5	16.7	
1983	64,335	1,662	452	1,210	25.8	7.0	18.8	
1984	64,717	1,739	488	1,251	26.9	7.6	19.4	
1985	65,244	1,729	468	1,261	26.5	7.2	19.3	
1986	65,652	1,722	498	1,224	26.2	7.6	18.6	
1987	68,499	1,684	505	1,179	25.4	7.6	17.8	
1988	68,755	1,643	504	1,139	24.7	7.6	17.1	
1989	69,167	1,600	563	1,037	23.2	8.2	15.0	
1990	69,507	1,617	543	1,074	23.3	7.8	15.5	
1991	70,439	1,708	545	1,163	24.2	7.7	16.5	
1992	70,763	1,603	522	1,081	22.7	7.4	15.3	
1993	72,253	1,689	597	1,092	23.4	8.3	15.1	
1994	74,205	1,700	550	1,150	23.0	7.5	15.6	
1995	75,304	1,582	525	1,057	21.0	7.0	14.0	
1996	76,417	1,611	566	1,045	21.1	7.4	13.7	
1997	77,319	1,475	603	872	19.1	7.8	11.3	
1998	78,846	1,412	570	842	17.9	7.2	10.7	
1999	80,410	1,460	560	900	18.2	7.0	11.2	
2000	81,131	1,512	553	959	18.6	6.8	11.8	
2001	81,202	1,440	554	886	17.7	6.8	10.9	1.98
2002	83,723	1,481	647	834	17.7	7.7	10.0	2.04
2003	82,781	1,498	668	830	18.1	8.1	10.0	2.06
2004	82,475	1,435	611	824	17.3	7.4	9.9	2.01
2005	82,858	1,536	673	863	18.3	8.0	10.3	2.20
2006	84,600	1,467	664	803	17.3	7.8	9.4	2.11
2007	85,033	1,499	630	869	17.4	7.3	10.1	2.24
2008	86,956	1,546	662	884	17.8	7.6	10.2	2.33
2009	87,298	1,580	684	896	18.1	7.8	10.3	2.38
2010	89,770	1,504	664	840	16.8	7.4	9.4	2.17
2011	87,441	1,625	691	934	18.6	7.9	10.7	2.33
2012	88,303	1,645	651	994	18.6	7.4	11.3	2.37
2013	89,949	1,566	717	849	17.4	8.0	9.4	2.26
2014	91,359	1,557	725	832	17.0	7.9	9.1	2.25
2015	93,419	1,592	703	889	17.0	7.5	9.5	2.31
2016	94,677	1,645	747	898	17.4	7.9	9.5	2.39
2017	95,843	1,651	748	903	17.2	7.8	9.4	2.41
2018	96,762	1,650	818	832	17.1	8.4	8.7	2.41
2019	97,625	1,605	795	810	16.4	8.1	8.3	2.36
2020	98,462	1,554	668	886	15.8	6.8	9.0	2.29
2021	99,258	1,665	925	740	16.8	9.3	7.5	2.46
2022	119,878	1,569	941	628	13.1	7.8	5.3	2.01
2023	119,773	1,553	879	674	13.0	7.3	5.7	2.02
2024	121,354	1,333	850	483	11.0	7.0	4.0	1.73
2025	122,730	1,293	845	448	10.5	6.9	3.7	1.68

=== Life expectancy ===
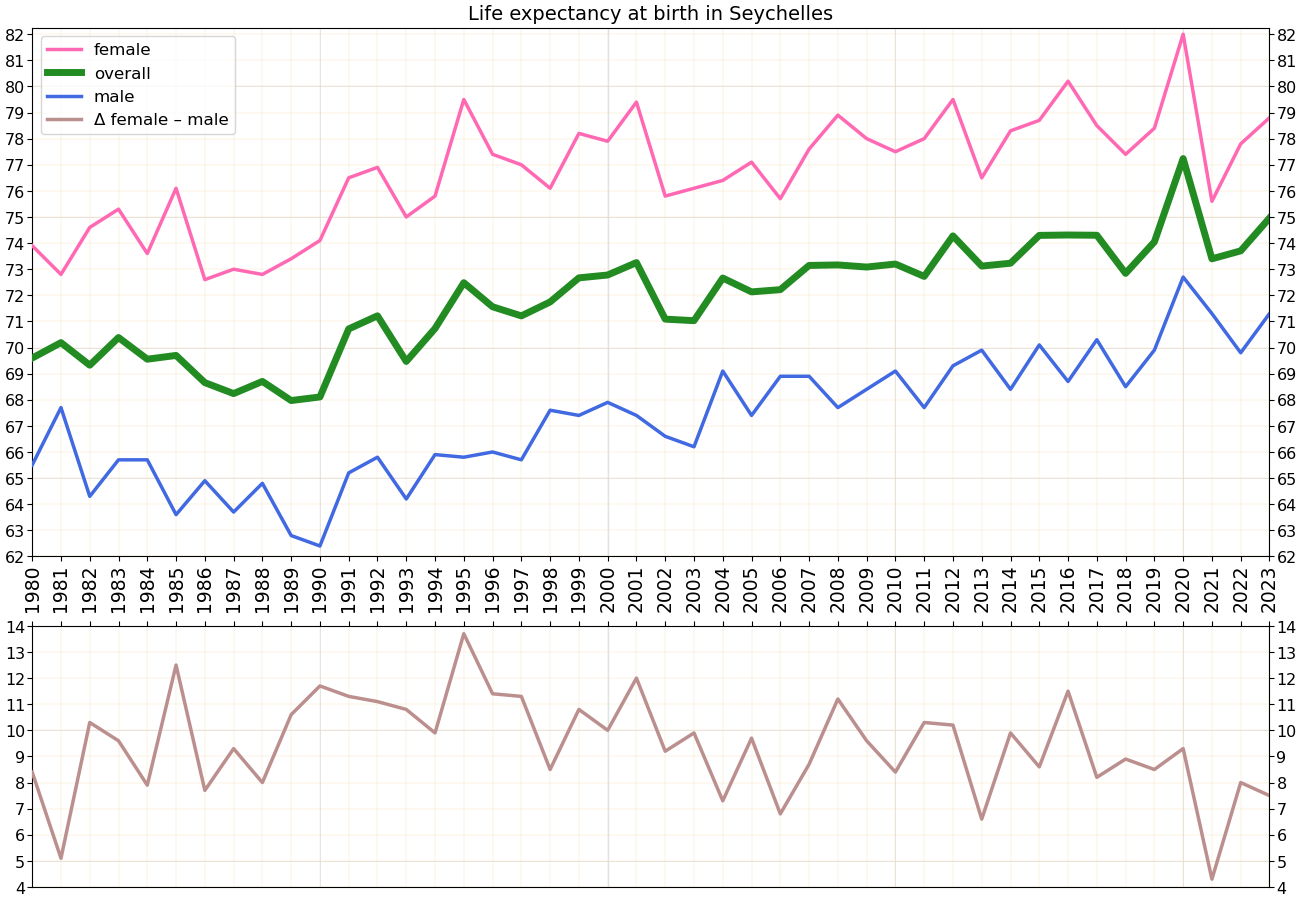
Life expectancy in Seychelles

Total population: 76.1 years. Country comparison to the world: 109th male: 71.67 years female: 80.66 years (2022 est.)

Total population: 75.8 years
Male: 71.4 years
Female: 80.4 years (2021 est.)

== Ethnic groups ==
Predominantly creole (mainly of East African and Malagasy heritage); also French, Indian, Chinese, and Arab populations

== Languages ==
Seychellois Creole (official) 89.1%, English (official) 5.1%, French (official) 0.7%, Other 3.8%, Unspecified 1.4% (2010 est.)

== Religion ==
Religious Affiliation in the Seychelles (2022 Census)
1. Roman Catholicism (61.3%)
2. Other Christian (13.6%)
3. Hinduism (5.40%)
4. Islam (2.40%)
5. Other (5.10%)
6. Not stated (Note: Includes Not Specified, Missing and Unable to classify- data mentioned in the Census) (12.2%)

Roman Catholic 76.2%, Anglican 6.1%, other Christian 6.9%, Hindu 2.4%, Muslim 1.6%, other 2%, unspecified or missing 4.8% (2010 census).
