= Vincent Meriton =

Vice-President of Seychelles from 2016 to 2020

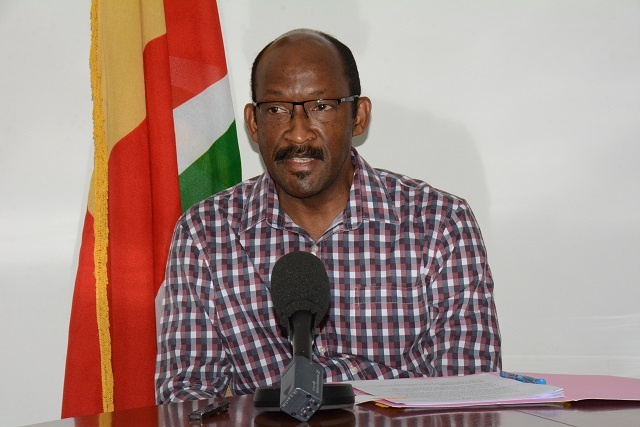

4th Vice-President of Seychelles
- In office 28 October 2016 – 27 October 2020
- President: Danny Faure
- Preceded by: Danny Faure
- Succeeded by: Ahmed Afif

Minister of Community Development, Social Affairs and Sports
- In office 20 July 2004 – 5 October 2016
- President: James Michel
- Succeeded by: Ministry disbanded

Personal details
- Born: Vincent Emmanuel Angelin Meriton; 28 December 1959 (age 66) Victoria, Seychelles
- Party: United Seychelles
- Occupation: Politician

Vincent Emmanuel Angelin Meriton (born 28 December 1959) is a Seychellois politician who served as the Vice-President of Seychelles from 2016 until 2020. He succeeded Danny Faure, and Party president of the People's Party. He once served as Seychelles' Minister for Community Development, Social Affairs and Sports.

In May 2024, he was nominated for the position of the African Union Commission Chairperson.

== Life ==
Educated in Moscow. He graduated with Master of Sociology from the Moscow State University.

He is a member of the center-left United Seychelles which was previously known as People's Party.

In 2004, he became Minister of Social Affairs and Employment, then Minister of Labor and Social Policy of the Republic of Seychelles, then head of the Ministries of Health and Social Affairs, Department of Community Development, Youth and Sports and, more recently, the Department of Social Affairs, Community Development and Sports.

Meriton was a member of the National Assembly from 1998 to 2002.

He is Minister of State and responsible for Community Development, Social Affairs and Sports, since 2015.

On 28 October 2016, Meriton was appointed vice-president of the Republic being responsible for Information, Blue Economy, ICT, Industries and Entrepreneurship Development, Religious Affairs and Civil Society, and Inner and Outer Islands. The Department of Foreign Affairs was assigned to Meriton in 2018. He served until 27 October 2020.

In February 2021, Meriton was replaced by Patrick Herminie as the leader of the United Seychelles party.

Political offices
Preceded by Danny Faure	Vice-President of Seychelles; 2016–2020	Succeeded by Ahmed Afif
