= Danny Faure =

President of Seychelles (2016–2020)

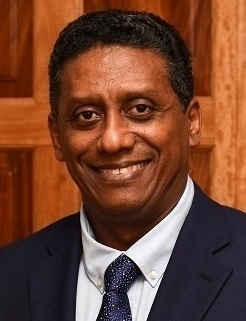
- Official portrait, 2018

4th President of Seychelles
- In office 16 October 2016 – 26 October 2020
- Vice President: Vincent Meriton
- Preceded by: James Michel
- Succeeded by: Wavel Ramkalawan

3rd Vice-President of Seychelles
- In office 1 July 2010 – 16 October 2016
- President: James Michel
- Preceded by: Joseph Belmont
- Succeeded by: Vincent Meriton

Personal details
- Born: 8 May 1962 (age 64) Kilembe, Protectorate of Uganda
- Party: United Seychelles Party
- Spouse(s): Jeanine Decommarmond (div. 2016); Shermin Rudie Faure
- Relations: Barry Faure
- Children: 5
- Education: University of Havana

Danny Faure (born 8 May 1962) is a Seychellois politician who served as the fourth President of Seychelles from 16 October 2016 until 26 October 2020. Previously, he served as Vice-President of Seychelles from 2010 to 2016. Faure is a member of the United Seychelles Party (PP).

== Background and education ==
Faure was born to Seychellois parents in the western Ugandan town of Kilembe. He completed his primary and secondary education in the Seychelles. He studied at the University of Havana in Cuba, graduating with a degree in political science.

== Career ==
In 1985, at the age of 23, Faure started working as an assistant curriculum officer at the Seychelles education ministry. He also worked as a lecturer at both the National Youth Service and the Seychelles Polytechnic.

In 1993, following the return of multiparty democracy to the island nation, Faure became the leader of government business in the National Assembly, serving in that capacity until 1998. That year, he was appointed Minister of Education. Over the years, he has served in various ministerial capacities including youth, finance, trade and industries, public administration and information and communication technology.

In 2006, he was appointed Minister of Finance by President James Michel. During his tenure at the finance, Seychelles embarked on a series of economic reforms, recommended by the International Monetary Fund. Faure oversaw the first generation reforms, which ran from October 2008 to October 2013. Faure served as designated minister between 2004 and 2010. He became Vice-President on 1 July 2010, while retaining the finance portfolio.

== Presidency ==
President James Michel announced on 27 September 2016 that he would resign, effective on 16 October, and transfer power to Vice-President Faure. The announcement coincided with the election of an opposition majority in the National Assembly. As there were four years of Michel's term remaining, it was to count as a full term for Faure. Faure was accordingly sworn in on 16 October 2016.

On 14 April 2019, Faure visited a British research submersible and made a speech from underwater, pleading for stronger protections for the world's oceans.

On 13 June 2019, Faure was awarded the National Geographic Society's prestigious ‘Planetary and Leadership Award’ at a National Geographic Awards Ceremony, at George Washington University, in Washington DC.

In October 2020, Faure lost the presidential election to Wavel Ramkalawan who succeeded him as President of Seychelles.

== Personal life ==
Faure is the father of three daughters and one son from his first marriage to Jeannine (née De Comarmond). Danny and Jeannine Faure finalized their divorce on 10 October 2016, less than one week before his inauguration as President of Seychelles.

Faure married his second wife, Shermin Rudie Bastienne, on 4 April 2021.

== See also ==
- List of foreign ministers in 2017
- List of current foreign ministers

Political offices
Preceded by Joseph Belmont	Vice-President of Seychelles; 2010–2016	Succeeded by Vincent Meriton
Preceded by James Michel	President of Seychelles; 2016–2020	Succeeded by Wavel Ramkalawan
