= List of colonial governors and administrators of Dominica =

This article lists the governors and other administrators of Dominica (where known), during its time as a colony of the Kingdom of Great Britain (1761–1778; 1784–1800), the Kingdom of France (1778–1784), and the United Kingdom (1800–1978).

James Garraway was noted as a onetime president of Dominica.

== Governors (1761–1833) ==
=== British rule (1761–1778) ===
- 1761–1763: Andrew Rollo, 5th Lord Rollo
- 1763–1765: Robert Melvill
- 1765–1767: George Scott (acting)
- 1768–1773: Sir William Young
- 1773–1774: William Stewart
- 1774–1778: Thomas Shirley
- 1778: William Stewart (acting)

=== French rule (1778–1784) ===
- 1778–1781: Marie-Charles, Marquis du Chilleau
- 1781–1782: Comte de Bourgon
- 1782–1784: M. de Beaupré

=== British rule (1784–1833) ===
- 1784–1792: Sir John Orde
  - 1789–1790: Thomas Bruce (acting)
- 1792–1794: Thomas Bruce (acting)
- 1794–1796: Henry Hamilton
- 1796–1797: John Matson (acting)
- 1797–1802: Andrew James Cochrane Johnstone
- 1802–1805: George Prevost
- 1805–1808: George Metcalfe (acting)
- 1808: Edward Barnes
- 1808–1809: James Montgomerie
- 1809–1812: Edward Barnes
- 1812–1813: John Corlet (acting)
- 1813–1814: George Robert Ainslie
- 1814–1816: Benjamin Lucas (acting)
- 1816: Robert Reid (acting)
- 1816–1819: Charles William Maxwell
- 1819–1820: Robert Reid (acting)
- 1820–1821: Samuel Ford Whittingham
- 1821–1822: Robert Reid (acting)
- 1822–1824: The Earl of Huntingdon
- 1824: William Bremner (acting)
- 1824–1830: William Nicolay
  - 1827–1828: John Laidlaw (acting)
- 1830–1832: James Potter Lockhart (acting)
- 1832–1833: Evan John Murray MacGregor

== Lieutenant-Governors (1833–1872) ==
In 1833, following the creation of the Federal Colony of the Leeward Islands, Dominica's governor was replaced by a lieutenant-governor, subordinate to the Governor-in-Chief of the Leeward Islands.

- 1833–1835: Charles Marsh Schomberg
- 1835–1837: James Potter Lockhart (acting)
- 1837–1838: Henry Light
- 1838: John Longley
- 1838–1839: S. Bridgewater (acting)
- 1839–1843: John Macphail
- 1843–1845: Dugald Stewart Laidlaw (acting)
- 1845–1851: George McDonald
- 1851–1857: Samuel Wensley Blackall
- 1857–1861: Harry St. George Ord (acting from 1860)
- 1860–1861: George Berkeley (acting)
- 1861–1864: Thomas Price
- 1865: William Cleaver Francis Robinson (acting)
- 1865–1867: James Robert Longden
- 1867–1869: Henry Ernest Gascoyne Bulwer (acting)
- 1869–1871: Sanford Freeling
- 1871–1872: Neale Porter (acting)

== Presidents (1872–1895) ==
In 1872, the lieutenant-governor was replaced by a president, who remained subordinate to the Governor-in-Chief of the Leeward Islands.

- 1872–1873: Alexander Wilson Moir
- 1873–1882: Charles Monroe Eldridge
- 1882–1887: James Meade
- 1887–1894: George Ruthven Le Hunte
- 1894–1895: Edward Baynes (acting)

== Administrators (1895–1967) ==
In 1895, the president was replaced by an administrator, who remained subordinate to the Governor-in-Chief of the Leeward Islands until 1940, when Dominica was transferred to the Windward Islands Colony. From 1940 to 1958, the administrator was subordinate to the Governor of the Windward Islands. From 1958 to 1962, the administrator was subordinate to the Governor-General of the West Indies Federation.

- 1895–1899: Philip Arthur Templer
- 1899–1905: Henry Hesketh Joudou Bell
- 1905–1914: William Douglas Young (acting from 1913)
- 1914: Edward Rawle Drayton
- 1915–1919: Arthur William Mahaffy
- 1919–1923: Robert Walter
- 1923–1924: Wilfred Bennett Davidson-Houston (acting)
- 1924–1930: Edward Carlyon Eliot
  - 1927–1928: Herbert Walter Peebles (acting)
- 1930–1931: Thomas Edwin Percival Baynes (acting)
- 1931–1933: Walter Andrew Bowring
- 1933–1937: Henry Bradshaw Popham
- 1937–1938: Thomas Edwin Percival Baynes (acting)
- 1938–1946: James Scott Neill (acting from 1945)
- 1946–1952: Edwin Porter Arrowsmith
- 1952–1959: Henry Laurence Lindo
- 1960–1964: Alec Lovelace
- 1965–1967: Geoffrey Colin Guy

== Governors (1967–1978) ==
In 1967, the administrator was replaced by a governor, following Dominica's designation as an Associated State.

- 1967: Geoffrey Colin Guy
- 1967–1978: Sir Louis Cools-Lartigue

== See also ==
- List of presidents of Dominica
