= Arthur Grimble =

British Colonial Service administrator (1888–1956)

Sir Arthur Grimble KCMG

Governor of the Windward Islands
- In office 18 May 1942 – 1948
- Monarch: George VI
- Preceded by: Sir Henry Bradshaw Popham
- Succeeded by: Brigadier Sir Robert Arundell

Governor of the Seychelles
- In office 1936 – 5 January 1942
- Monarchs: Edward VIII; George VI
- Preceded by: Sir Gordon Lethem
- Succeeded by: William Marston Logan

Administrator of Saint Vincent
- In office 1933–1936
- Monarchs: George V Edward VIII
- Preceded by: Herbert Walter Peebles
- Succeeded by: Arthur Alban Wright

Resident Commissioner of the Gilbert and Ellice Islands
- In office 1 January 1925 – December 1933
- Monarch: George V
- Preceded by: Herbert Reginald McClure
- Succeeded by: Jack Barley
- In office April 1919 – February 1922 acting
- Monarch: George V
- Preceded by: Edward Carlyon Eliot
- Succeeded by: Herbert Reginald McClure

Personal details
- Born: 11 June 1888 British Hong Kong
- Died: 13 December 1956 (aged 68) London
- Education: University of Cambridge
- Occupation: Colonial Service
- Writing career
- Notable work: A Pattern of Islands

Sir Arthur Francis Grimble, KCMG (11 June 1888 – 13 December 1956) was a British Colonial Service administrator and writer.

== Biography ==
Grimble was educated at Chigwell School and Magdalene College, Cambridge. He then went to France and Germany for postgraduate studies. After joining the Colonial Office in 1914 he became the very first cadet administrative officer in the Gilbert and Ellice Islands. From April 1919 he acted as the Resident Commissioner until Herbert Reginald McClure took up his appointment as Resident Commissioner. In 1925 Grimble succeeded McClure as Resident Commissioner. He learned the Gilbertese language, and became a specialist in the myths and oral traditions of the Kiribati people. He remained in the islands until 1933. He has been the source of many people's impressions of the islands through his radio broadcast on BBC in the 1950s and his bestselling book A Pattern of Islands.

Grimble later served as Administrator and Colonial Secretary of St Vincent from 1933, Governor of the Seychelles (1936–1942) and as Governor of the Windward Islands (1942–1948).

Grimble was appointed a Companion of the Order of St Michael and St George (CMG) in the 1930 New Year Honours, and promoted to Knight Commander of the Order (KCMG) in the 1938 New Year Honours.

He was appointed Honorary Colonel of the Windward Islands Battalion in 1944.

== Literary career ==
After retiring and moving to Britain in 1948 Grimble became a writer and broadcaster. He wrote A Pattern of Islands (London, John Murray 1952, published in the United States as We Chose the Islands) and Return to the Islands (1957), both of which were bestsellers. Pacific Destiny, a film based on his experiences, was released in 1956. Grimble's scholarly work on Gilbertese culture is covered in Henry Evans Maude's book Tungaru Traditions: Writings on the Atoll Culture of the Gilbert Islands (Honolulu: University of Hawaiʻi Press, 1989, ISBN 0-8248-1217-4).

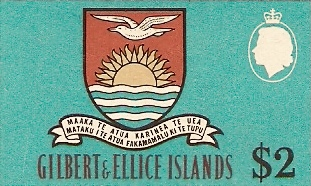
Arms of the Gilbert & Ellice Islands on a stamp

== Heraldic artist ==
In 1931 Grimble designed the coat of arms of the British colony of the Gilbert and Ellice Islands, which was granted in 1937. The design has been retained for the flag of Kiribati.

Government offices
Preceded by Edward Carlyon Eliot	Resident Commissioner of the Gilbert and Ellice Islands; April 1919 – February 1922 acting	Succeeded by Herbert Reginald McClure
Preceded by Herbert Reginald McClure	Resident Commissioner of the Gilbert and Ellice Islands; 1 January 1925 – December 1933	Succeeded by Jack Barley
Preceded by Herbert Walter Peebles	Administrator of Saint Vincent; 1933 – 1936	Succeeded by Arthur Alban Wright
Preceded by Sir Gordon James Lethem	Governor of the Seychelles; 1936 – 5 January 1942	Succeeded by Sir William Logan
Preceded by Sir Henry Bradshaw Popham	Governor of the Windward Islands; 18 May 1942 – 1948	Succeeded by Brigadier Sir Robert Arundell
