= Walter Bowring =

Walter Bowring may refer to:

- Walter Armiger Bowring (1874–1931), New Zealand painter, illustrator, cartoonist and caricaturist
- Walter Andrew Bowring (1875–1950) was a British colonial administrator
