= Peter Popham =

English journalist, author, and playwright (born 1952)

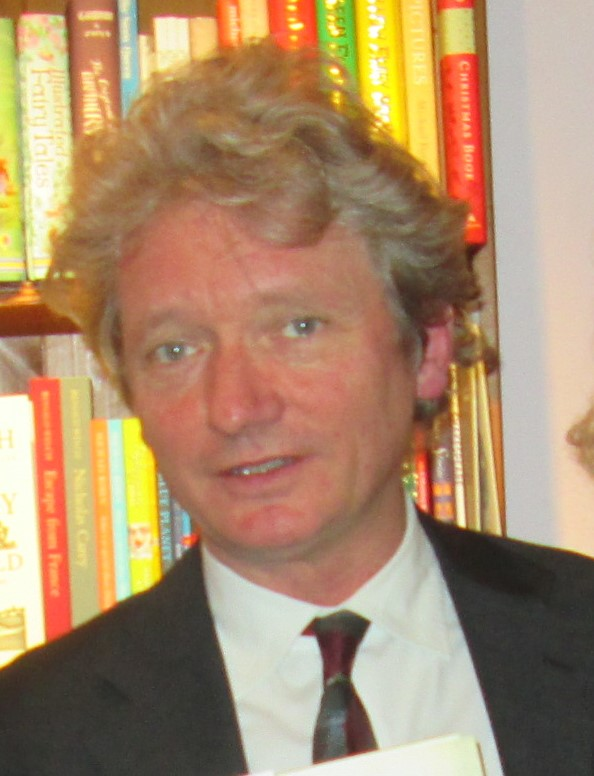
- Popham in 2016
- Born: 10 January 1952 (age 74); Cork, Ireland
- Education: University of Leeds
- Occupations: Journalist; Author
- Years active: 1976–present
- Relatives: Henry Bradshaw Popham (grandfather)

Peter Popham (born 10 January 1952) is an English journalist, author, and playwright. He is best known for his journalism at The Independent from 1990 to 2016, and his books on Aung San Suu Kyi.

== Early life ==
Popham was born in Cork, Ireland, in 1952. His father was the poet, novelist, and military historian Hugh Henry Home Popham. Raised in Richmond, Surrey, he was educated at Latymer Upper School, where he edited the school magazine, and was a contributor to the notorious ‘Schoolkids Issue’ of the underground magazine, Oz.

== Education and early career ==
At the University of Leeds, where he read English, he edited Poetry and Audience, the university's long-established poetry magazine, and launched Leeds Larynx, a cultural review. His first fiction to be published was "Collision and Goodbye", a short story, in Transatlantic Review no. 55/56, in May 1976.

After working in theatres in Leeds, London and Bristol and writing more plays, in 1977 he moved to Japan, where after teaching English for two years he became a freelance journalist and wrote his first book, Tokyo: the City at the End of the World, published by Kodansha International in 1985. It was translated into Japanese and published the same year by Asahi Shinbunsha as Portrait of Tokyo (東京の肖像, Tōkyō no Shōzō).

== At The Independent ==
In 1990 he joined the staff of the British newspaper The Independent as feature writer on The Independent Magazine under Alexander Chancellor. In 1997 he was appointed South Asia correspondent of the newspaper and moved to Delhi. While living in Delhi he drafted his novel Across the Great Divide, set before and after India's independence and partition. In 2002 he moved to Italy to become the Rome correspondent.

In 2011 his study of Aung San Suu Kyi, The Lady and the Peacock, was published by Random House. It was translated into Dutch, Japanese, Korean, Chinese and Mongolian and published in the US by The Experiment. A pirated edition appeared in Burma, on sale at the headquarters of Suu Kyi's party, the National League for Democracy, in Yangon. His sequel, The Lady and the Generals, was published by Penguin Random House in 2016.

Since leaving The Independent in 2016 he has written several plays, including The Kingdom of Heaven, performed at the Script Room in London in February 2019, and Savages, in a Zoom production directed by Sebastian Michael and starring Tim Bentinck, in July 2020.

== Selected works ==
- Popham, Peter (1985). Tokyo: The City at the End of the World. Kodansha International. ISBN 9780870117268.
- Popham, Peter (2011). The Lady and the Peacock: The Life of Aung San Suu Kyi. Random House. ISBN 9781846042485.
- Popham, Peter (2016). The Lady and the Generals: Aung San Suu Kyi and Burma's Struggle for Freedom. Penguin Random House. ISBN 9781846043710.
- Popham, Peter (2022). India Be Damned. Camphor Press. ISBN 9781788692717.
