= Robert Coryndon =

Sir Robert Thorne Coryndon KCMG
- Robert Coryndon, Nairobi, 1923, with Palmer Kerrison (left) and E.A.T. Dutton (right)

Governor of Kenya
- In office 1922 – 10 February 1925
- Preceded by: Sir Edward Northey
- Succeeded by: Sir Edward Grigg

Governor of Uganda
- In office 1918–1922
- Preceded by: Sir Frederick Jackson
- Succeeded by: Sir Geoffrey Archer

Resident Commissioner in Basutoland
- In office 1916–1917
- Preceded by: Sir Herbert Sloley
- Succeeded by: Sir Edward Garraway

Resident Commissioner in Swaziland
- In office 1907–1916
- Preceded by: Francis Enraght-Moony
- Succeeded by: de Symons Honey

Personal details
- Born: 2 April 1870 Cape Colony
- Died: 10 February 1925 (aged 54) Nairobi

Sir Robert Thorne Coryndon, KCMG (2 April 1870 – 10 February 1925) was a British colonial administrator, a former secretary of Cecil Rhodes who became Governor of the colonies of Uganda (1918–1922) and Kenya (1922–1925). He was one of the most powerful of colonial administrators of his day.

== Early years ==
Robert Thorne Coryndon was born to English parents in Cape Colony, South Africa on 2 April 1870. He was educated at St. Andrew's College, Grahamstown, and at Cheltenham College in England. In 1889 he returned to South Africa to serve his articles as a lawyer with his uncles's firm, Caldecott and Bell of Kimberley. Unhappy with office work, after a few months he joined the Bechuanaland Border Police run by the British South Africa Company (BSAC) which Cecil Rhodes had formed in 1889. In 1890 he was a member of the Pioneer Force occupying Mashonaland. In 1893 and 1896 he served in campaigns in Matabeleland.

In 1896 Coryndon was appointed private secretary to Cecil Rhodes, and served in that role during the 1896 Parliamentary Inquiry into the Jameson Raid. In summer of 1897 he was sent by Rhodes to be the BSAC representative in Barotseland. In October 1897 he reached King Lewanika's capital, Lealui, where he was given a cool reception. Lewanika could not accept that Coryndon could represent both a company and the government. In November 1899 Queen Victoria signed an order in council that established company rule in Barotziland-North-Western Rhodesia, and in September 1900 Coryndon was appointed commissioner. He held this post until 1907. He then became Resident Commissioner in Swaziland, and was chairman of the Southern Rhodesian Native Reserves Commission of 1914–1915. In 1916 he was appointed Resident Commissioner in Basutoland.

== Colonial governor ==
=== Uganda ===
In 1917 Coryndon was given the position of Governor and Commander-in-Chief of Uganda, taking office in 1918. As Governor, he was involved in a crisis over the East African rupee, which had been pegged to the Indian rupee. The settlers were in favour of devaluing the currency and then pegging it to the British pound, while investors strongly objected to the loss that they would incur as a result. One effect of the change would be to devalue the coinage, almost entirely held by African cotton growers. Some officials calculated that the loss incurred by the average family would be small, but others including Coryndon were concerned about the destruction of trust in the government that would result. Coryndon wrote "I do not think you can properly estimate the effect of a measure of this sort by a calculation of average loss per head". Coryndon liked Uganda because there was "no settler problem" meaning there were no European settlers. Coryndon's administration was praised for taking numerous measures to improve the economic well-being of Africans who were part of the cash economy. Coryndon was governor of Uganda at a time of rapid economic expansion, and he was noted to ensure that the colony's indigenous African population benefited from the economy's expansion. Coryndon eliminated unpopular taxes and forgave all African debts for fines owed to the colonial government. Coryndon also raised wages for all Africans employed by the British government on the grounds that the wages needed to be adjusted for inflation.

=== Kenya ===
Winston Churchill was secretary of state for the colonies in the early 1920s. In 1922 he appointed Coryndon Governor and Commander-in-Chief of Kenya and High Commissioner of Zanzibar. The previous governor Edward Northey had written in 1919: "I believe there is a great future for this country, but only if a steady flow of natives out of the Reserves, working willingly for a good wage, well-housed and fed, under European control and supervision, can be properly organized". However, Northey's policies had brought the colony near to bankruptcy. Between 1913 and 1920 native production had actually fallen.

Coryndon was expected to introduce a new policy that supported expansion of African production. In a letter to Churchill soon after arriving in Kenya, Coryndon said "I believe I shall be able to handle the settlers: largely by laughing at them a little and by getting them to use a sense of proportion in their outlook. I shall push native development and native crops. I am confident as to the future on the whole". Coryndon defined a "dual policy" to correct the problems that stemmed from excessive bias toward settler demands, while avoiding the idea that native interests were paramount. In September 1923 Coryndon said the interest of Europeans and natives were complementary, and that if given the proper incentives and guidance the native population would become Kenya's greatest asset. The administration should pay attention to the native's moral welfare, sense of responsibility to the state, health and material well-being. The natives should be given education suitable to their needs. The dual policy later became the official basis for administering the colony.

Churchill gave Coryndon the mandate of solving the "Indian question" in Kenya. Churchill was in favour of white settlement, although not of self-government. However, he saw a need for Indian settlers to act as merchants. There was a growing influx of Indians into Nairobi's city centre in the 1920s, working as shopkeepers, railway workers, government clerks and small-scale manufacturers. In response, the whites moved out to the Upper Nairobi western suburbs. The Indians were pressing for similar political rights to those of the white settlers. The Imperial government response was to seek a way to set educational and property or income qualifications that would result in about 10% of Indians getting the vote, and defining qualifications for candidates that would ensure a solid majority of Europeans while allowing some Indian elected officials. Coryndon presented these proposals at a meeting of representatives of the European community in Nairobi, who unanimously rejected them. Before agreeing to put the matter to the vote in the legislature, they insisted that measures had to be enacted to restrict further Indian immigration.

Coryndon was appointed CMG in 1911 and KCMG in 1919. He died in Nairobi on 10 February 1925. On 17 February 1925 the Kenyan Legislative Council granted an annual allowance of 500 pounds to Lady Coryndon for life or until she remarried, two hundred pounds to each of his three sons until they reached the age of 21, and one hundred pounds to his daughter until she married or reached the age of 21.

== Postscript ==
Coryndon was one of Cecil Rhodes's "twelve apostles", and owed much to Rhodes' teachings. His private secretary later described him as a "simple man with simple ideas". He believed in a policy of indirect rule, to "build up a more modern society on the traditions of the people".

In 1929 the Kenyan colonial government allocated land in Nairobi for a museum. The Coryndon Museum was officially opened on 22 September 1930. It became the Nairobi National Museum after independence in 1963. The 207 feet (63 m), 800 ton steamer SS Robert Coryndon, built by J Thorneycroft & Co of Southampton, was in service on Lake Albert between 1930 and 1964. The ship provided operated a Class A ferry service from Butiaba to the Congo, through Pakwach in Pakwach District. Ernest Hemingway, who had stop in Butiaba after his plane crashed when he was on a hunting safari, described the ship as "magnificence on water". The ship sank in 1964. All that remains is an abandoned hulk.

Government offices
Preceded by Francis Enraght-Moony	Resident Commissioner of Swaziland; 1907–1916	Succeeded by Sir De Symons Montagu George Honey
