= Hubert Rance =

British Army general (1898–1974)

Major-General Sir Hubert Rance GCMG GBE CB
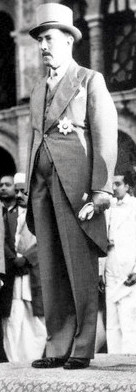
- Rance in 1948

Governor of Trinidad and Tobago
- In office 19 April 1950 – June 1955
- Monarchs: George VI; Elizabeth II
- Preceded by: Sir John Valentine Wistar Shaw
- Succeeded by: Sir Edward Beetham

Governor of British Burma
- In office 31 August 1946 – 4 January 1948
- Monarch: George VI
- Preceded by: Sir Reginald Dorman-Smith
- Succeeded by: Sao Shwe Thaik as President of Burma

Personal details
- Born: 17 July 1898 Plymouth, United Kingdom
- Died: 24 January 1974 (aged 75) London, United Kingdom
- Occupation: Administrator

Major-General Sir Hubert Elvin Rance GCMG GBE CB (17 July 1898 – 24 January 1974) was a British politician who was the last Governor of British Burma between 1946 and 1948, during the transition from Japanese to British colonial administration. Later he became Governor of Trinidad and Tobago from 1950 to 1955.

== Early life ==
Rance was born in Plymouth on 17 July 1898, the son of Frederick Hubert Rance (1862 – 29 March 1942) and his wife Minnie Florence Eleanor née Shaw (1871–1964).

Rance was educated at Wimbledon College,

In Q1 1927 in Hastings, Sussex, Rance married Mary Noel née Guy (1905–1997). Their daughter Elizabeth M was born in Richmond, Yorks, in Q2 1931, and their son David E. in N.W. Surrey in Q3 1935.

== Career to 1945 ==
Rance joined the British Army in 1916 and fought in the First World War with the Worcestershire Regiment. Later he transferred to the Signal Corps and, after being an instructor at the Staff College, Camberley between the wars, served in the Second World War where he played a part in the evacuation of Dunkirk in a senior role with the British Expeditionary Force. He also held senior War Office posts directing army training.

== Burma ==
In 1945, he was appointed Director of Civil Affairs in Burma, restoring British control after Japanese forces withdrew. Sir Reginald Dorman-Smith was appointed Governor in 1946, but British Prime Minister Attlee, advised by The 1st Viscount Mountbatten of Burma, soon decided that Rance should replace him. Dorman-Smith's imprisonment of a popular nationalist leader, Aung San, had provoked anger and the threat of rebellion against the British, while Rance had a more conciliatory approach.

British policy started to move away from an attempt at a slow, gradual transition to independence, and it was decided that Rance should co-operate with Aung San and his Anti-Fascist People's Freedom League. Aung San was believed to be less hostile to British interests, and less radical in his nationalism than some other political figures, like the communists, for example.

Rance became Governor on the last day of August 1946, and on 27 January 1947 Attlee made an agreement with Aung San that independence would come as soon as possible, with elections in April. British hopes of a smooth handover of power allowing the UK to retain some influence were threatened when Aung San was assassinated in July 1947. Rance's prompt action in making U Nu the Prime Minister within hours is believed to have been a decisive factor in avoiding greater upheaval.

In a formal ceremony on 4 January 1948, Governor Rance handed over to Sao Shwe Thaik, 1st President of Burma, while Nu continued as Prime Minister. By the time he left Burma, Rance had retired from the army. His formal title was Major General Sir Hubert Elvin Rance, GBE, CB, and, in 1948, he was made a GCMG. New Burma Government honorably awarded Agga Maha Thray Sithu title to him as one of the foremost holders.

== West Indies ==
He acted as British governor of Trinidad and Tobago between 19 April 1950 and June 1955. He is author of two reports published by the Colonial Office in London in 1950: Development and welfare in the West Indies, 1947-49 and Report of the British Caribbean Standing Closer Association Committee, 1948-49. In May 1956, he published an article on Burma’s Economic Problems in the Eastern World.

Hubert Rance Street in Vistabella, San Fernando, Trinidad and Tobago was named in his honour.

== Death ==
Rance died on 24 January 1974 at the age of 75.

== Sources ==
- Clive Christie, The Karens in Turbulent Times and Enduring People (2000) ed. Jean Michaud
- William Roger Louis, Dissolution of the British Empire in The Oxford History of the British Empire (1999) ed. Brown, Louis, Low
- Burma: The Curse of Independence (2001)
- British in Burma (Encyclopædia Britannica)
- King's College Military Archives
- DNB articles on U Nu and Dorman-Smith
- Smart, Nick (2005). Biographical Dictionary of British Generals of the Second World War. Barnsley, South Yorkshire: Pen and Sword Books. ISBN 1844150496.

Government offices
Preceded by Sir Reginald Dorman-Smith	Governor of British Crown Colony of Burma; 1946	Succeeded by Sir Reginald Dorman-Smith
Preceded by Sir Reginald Dorman-Smith	Governor of British Crown Colony of Burma; 1946–1948	Succeeded by President of the Union of Burma Sao Shwe Thaik
Preceded by Sir John Valentine Wistar Shaw	Governor of Trinidad and Tobago; 1950–1955	Succeeded by Sir Edward Betham Beetham
