= Cavendish Boyle =

British civil servant, magistrate and colonial administrator

Sir Cavendish Boyle KCMG AMInstCE
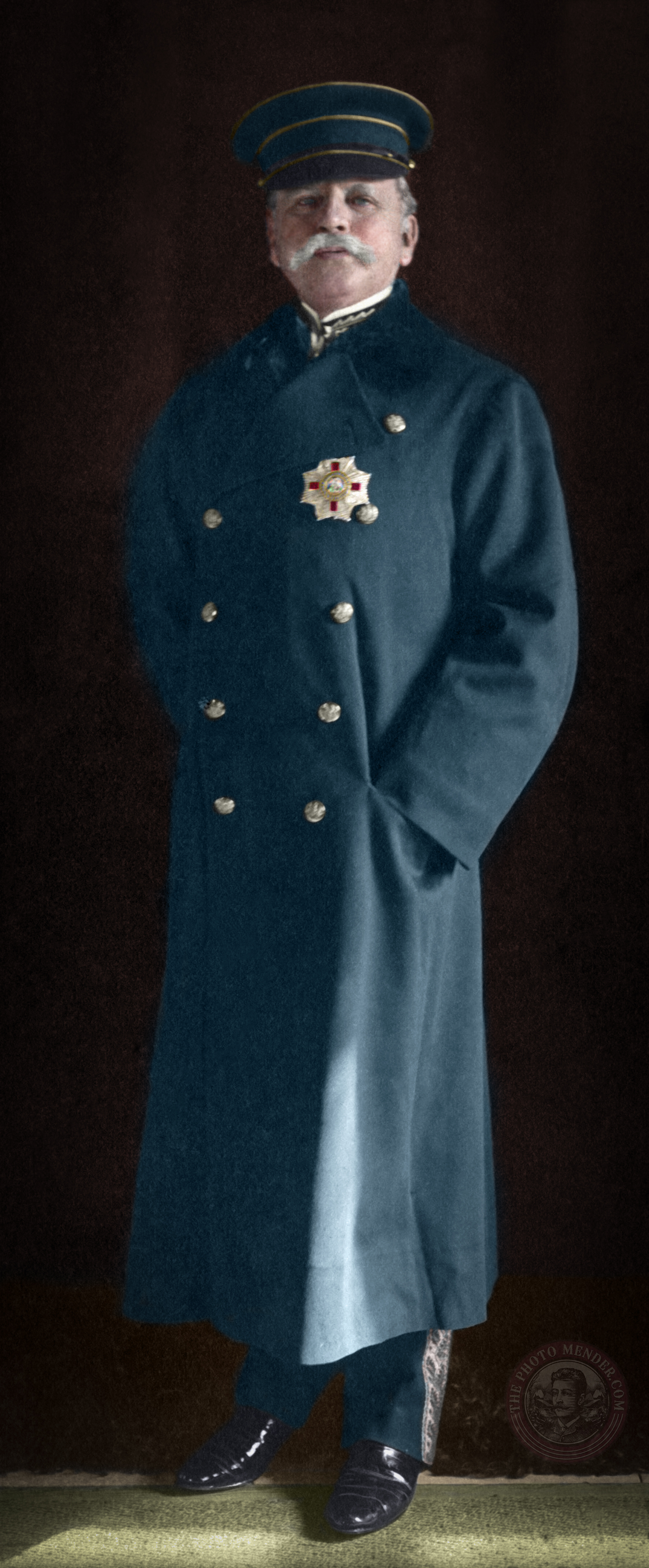
- Sir Cavendish with the badge of the Order of Saint Michael and Saint George

Governor of British Guiana Acting
- In office 15 December 1894 – 29 January 1895 (Note: Acting for Lees, first time)
- Monarch: Victoria
- Preceded by: Charles Cameron Lees
- Succeeded by: Charles Cameron Lees
- In office September 1895 – March 1896 (Note: Acting for Lees, second time)
- Preceded by: Charles Cameron Lees
- Succeeded by: Augustus Hemming
- In office 1 October 1896 – 18 November 1896 (Note: Acting for Hemming, first time)
- Preceded by: Augustus Hemming
- Succeeded by: Augustus Hemming
- In office 27 May 1897 – 28 July 1897 (Note: Acting for Hemming, second time)
- Preceded by: Augustus Hemming
- Succeeded by: Augustus Hemming

59th Colonial Governor of Newfoundland
- In office 1901–1904
- Monarch: Edward VII
- Preceded by: Henry McCallum
- Succeeded by: William MacGregor

19th Governor of British Mauritius
- In office 20 August 1904 – 10 April 1911
- Monarchs: Edward VII; George V
- Preceded by: Graham John Bower Acting
- Succeeded by: Graham John Bower Acting

Personal details
- Born: Charles Cavendish Boyle; 29 May 1849 Bridgetown, Barbados, British Windward Islands
- Died: 29 May 1916 (aged 67) London, England
- Citizenship: British
- Spouse: Judith Sassoon (m. 1914)
- Profession: Colonial administrator

Viceregal styles of Sir Cavendish Boyle
- Reference style: His Excellency
- Spoken style: Your Excellency

Sir Charles Cavendish Boyle KCMG AMInstCE (29 May 1849 – 17 September 1916) was a British civil servant, magistrate, and colonial administrator who served as Colonial Governor of Newfoundland, Mauritius and British Guiana. He wrote the lyrics for the anthem of the Dominion and later Province of Newfoundland, "Ode to Newfoundland".

== Early life and education ==
Known as Cavendish Boyle, he was born in Barbados into an ancient Irish family, the son of Capt. Cavendish Spencer Boyle and Rose Susan Alexander, daughter of Lt-Col. C. C. Alexander. He was the grandson of Sir Courtenay Boyle and the great-grandson of the Seventh Earl of Cork and Earl of Orrery. His elder brother, Sir Courtenay Edmund Boyle, was also a civil servant who served as Permanent Secretary to the Board of Trade.

Boyle was educated in London at Charterhouse, and later studied colonial administration and law.

== Career ==
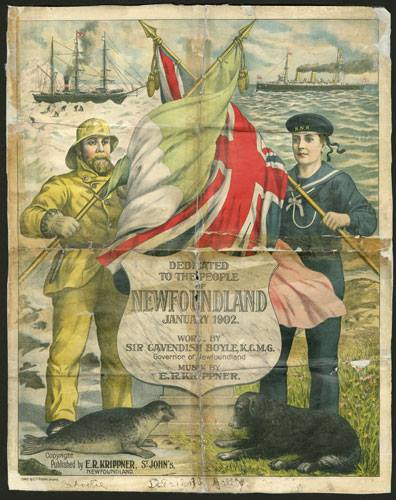
Sheet music produced for the debut of "Ode to Newfoundland" in 1902.

Boyle joined the British Colonial Office and was made magistrate in the Leeward Islands in 1879. He served as Colonial Secretary of Bermuda from 1882 to 1888 and in Gibraltar from 1888 to 1894. He was appointed a Companion of the Order of Saint Michael and Saint John (CMG) in 1889, and granted a knighthood in the same order in the 1897 Diamond Jubilee Honours.

In 1894 he moved to British Guiana, where he was Government Secretary and acted as Governor several times.

In March 1901, he was appointed Governor of Newfoundland, where he arrived in St. Johns in mid-June. He stayed as such until 1904, and wrote poems to the island's rugged beauty including the Ode to Newfoundland which was adopted as the dominion's national anthem. As governor, Boyle donated a trophy, the Boyle Challenge Cup, to the Newfoundland Hockey League.

He continued his colonial career with a posting as the 19th Governor of Mauritius from 20 August 1904 to 10 April 1911, after which he retired to Brighton, England.

== Personal life ==
In 1914, Boyle married to Louise Judith Sassoon MBE, daughter of Reuben David Sassoon (1835-1905). They had no children. He died in London in 1916 after undergoing an operation. His widow, who was 25 years his junior, lived to be 90, dying in 1964.

== Notes ==
Government offices
Preceded by Sir Charles Lees	Governor of British Guiana, acting 1895–1896	Succeeded by Sir Augustus William Lawson Hemming
Preceded by Sir Henry Edward McCallum	Colonial Governor of Newfoundland; 1901–1904	Succeeded by Sir William Macgregor
Preceded by Sir Charles Bruce	Governor of Mauritius; 1904–1911	Succeeded by Sir John Chancellor
