= Gordon Lethem =

British colonial administrator

Sir Gordon James Lethem KCMG

Governor of British Guiana
- In office 7 November 1941 – 12 April 1947
- Monarch: George VI
- Preceded by: Sir Wilfrid Edward Francis Jackson
- Succeeded by: Sir Charles Campbell Woolley

Governor of the Leeward Islands
- In office 1936–1941
- Monarchs: Edward VIII; George VI
- Preceded by: Sir Thomas Reginald St. Johnston
- Succeeded by: Sir Douglas James Jardine

Governor of the Seychelles
- In office 1934–1936
- Monarchs: George V Edward VIII
- Preceded by: Sir de Symons Honey
- Succeeded by: William Marston Logan

Personal details
- Born: 16 September 1886 Leith, Scotland, United Kingdom
- Died: 14 August 1962 (aged 75) Eskdalemuir, Scotland, United Kingdom

Sir Gordon James Lethem, KCMG (16 September 1886 – 14 August 1962) was a British colonial administrator.

== Biography ==
He was born in Leith, Scotland, the son of James Lethem and Marian Macintosh.

He was Governor of the Seychelles from 1934 to 1936; Governor of the Leeward Islands from 1936 to 1941; and Governor of British Guiana from 7 November 1941 to 1946. He was acting Governor from 1946 to 12 April 1947. He also served in Nigeria. Lethem's papers are held in Bodleian Library at the University of Oxford.

After retiring from the civil service he became involved in politics. He was a member of the Liberal Party. In 1950 he was Vice-President of the Scottish Liberal Party. He stood as a Liberal candidate at the United Kingdom general election of 1950 in the constituency of Banffshire. He finished third and did not stand for parliament again.

He died at his home in Eskdalemuir on 15 August 1962.

The city of Lethem, Guyana is named after him.

Government offices
Preceded by Sir de Symons Montagu George Honey	Governor of the Seychelles; 1934–1936	Succeeded by Arthur Francis Grimble
Preceded by Sir Thomas St. Johnston	Governor of the Leeward Islands; 1936–1941	Succeeded by Sir Douglas James Jardine
Preceded by Sir Wilfrid Edward Francis Jackson	Governor of British Guiana; 1941–1947	Succeeded by Sir Charles Campbell Woolley
