= Charles Cameron Lees (colonial administrator) =

British colonial administrator

Sir Charles Cameron Lees KCMG
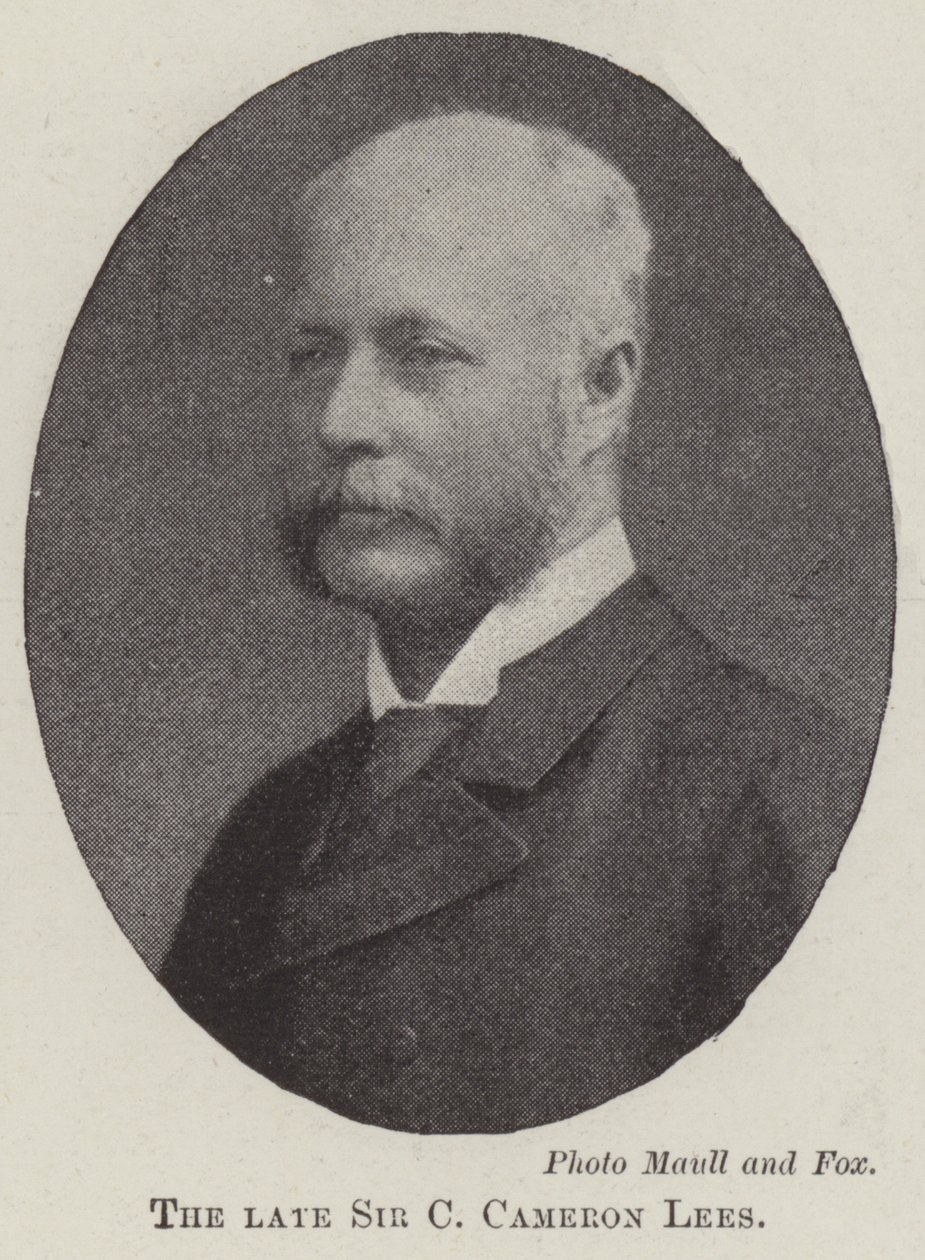

Governor of British Guiana
- In office 1893–1895
- Monarch: Victoria
- Preceded by: Sir Charles Bruce
- Succeeded by: Cavendish Boyle

Personal details
- Born: 11 March 1837
- Died: 26 July 1898 (aged 61)
- Resting place: Brompton Cemetery, London, England
- Spouse: Maria Ledwell Nugent (m. 1875)
- Parent: John Campbell Lees
- Profession: Colonial administrator

Sir Charles Cameron Lees KCMG (11 March 1837 – 26 July 1898) was a British military officer and colonial administrator.

He was the son of John Campbell Lees, former Chief Justice of the Bahamas.

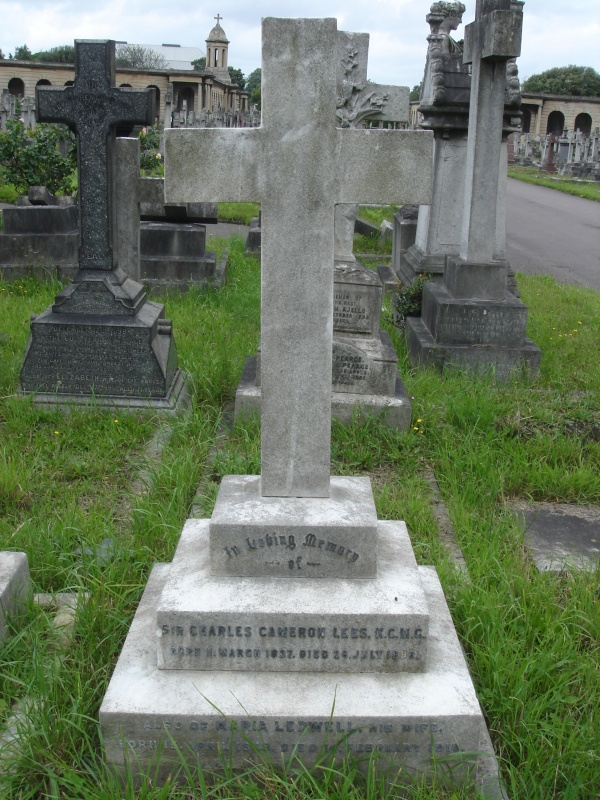
Funerary monument, Brompton Cemetery, London

He was originally commissioned into the 1st West India Regiment, but transferred to the 76th Foot in 1854, was promoted lieutenant, and transferred to the 23rd Foot as adjutant in 1858. He resigned as adjutant in 1864 and retired in 1866, becoming adjutant of the 3rd Derbyshire Rifle Volunteers later that year.

Lees was acting governor of the Gold Coast in 1874, 1876 and 1878–79, Governor of Labuan 1879-1881, Governor of the Bahamas from 1881 to 1884, and Governor of the Leeward Islands from 1884 to 1885. He was 16th Governor of Mauritius from 21 December 1889 to 12 March 1892 and was Governor of British Guiana from 1893 to 1895.

In 1875, he married Maria Ledwell Nugent daughter of Sir Oliver Nugent of Antigua. Lees is buried in Brompton Cemetery, London.

Government offices
Preceded by James Maxwell	Governor of the Gold Coast, acting 1874	Succeeded by George Strahan
Preceded by George Strahan	Governor of the Gold Coast, acting 1876	Succeeded by Sanford Freeling
Preceded by Sanford Freeling	Governor of the Gold Coast, acting 1878–1879	Succeeded by Herbert Taylor Ussher
Preceded by Herbert Taylor Ussher	Governor of Labuan; 1879–1881	Succeeded by Peter Leys (acting)
Preceded by Jeremiah Thomas Fitzgerald Callaghan	Governor of the Bahamas; 1881–1884	Succeeded by Sir Henry Arthur Blake
Preceded by John Hawley Glover	Governor of the Leeward Islands; 1884–1885	Succeeded by Charles Monroe Eldridge
Preceded by William Robinson	Governor of Barbados; 1885–1889	Succeeded by Sir Walter Joseph Sendall
Preceded by Sir John Pope Hennessy	Governor of Mauritius; 1889–1892	Succeeded by Sir Hubert Edward Henry Jerningham
Preceded by Sir Charles Bruce	Governor of British Guiana; 1893–1895	Succeeded by Charles Cavendish Boyle
