= Governor of British Mauritius =

UK Government official, 1810 to 1968

Governor of Mauritius
- Governor of Mauritius Flag (1906–1968)
- Residence: State House (Official)
- Appointer: Government of the United Kingdom
- Precursor: Governor of Isle de France
- Formation: 12 April 1810; 216 years ago
- First holder: Sir Robert Farquhar
- Final holder: Sir John Shaw Rennie
- Abolished: 12 March 1968; 58 years ago
- Succession: Governor-General of Mauritius

The governor of Mauritius was the official who governed the Crown Colony of Mauritius (now Republic of Mauritius) during the British colonial period between 1810 and 1968. Upon the end of British rule and the independence of Mauritius in 1968, this office was replaced by the governor-general, who represented the British monarch and not the Government of the United Kingdom as did the governor. The office of Governor-General was itself abolished in 1992 and replaced by the post of President when Mauritius became a republic.

== List of governors (1810–1968) ==
A list of British governors of Mauritius from 1810 to 1968.

No.	Portrait	Name	Term of office	
No.	Portrait	Name	Took office	Left office
Mauritius
1		Sir Robert Farquhar	4 December 1810	20 May 1823
		Henry Warde; Acting for Farquhar	18 April 1811	15 July 1811
		Gage John Hall; Acting for Farquhar	10 November 1817	10 December 1818
		Sir John Dalrymple; Acting for Farquhar	10 December 1818	6 February 1819
		Sir Ralph Darling; Acting for Farquhar	6 February 1819	6 July 1820
		Sir Ralph Darling; Acting	20 May 1823	12 June 1823
2		Sir Galbraith Lowry Cole	12 June 1823	17 June 1828
3		Sir Charles Colville	17 June 1828	3 February 1833
4		Sir William Nicolay	4 February 1833	20 February 1840
		James Power; Acting	20 February 1840	16 July 1840
5		Sir Lionel Smith	16 July 1840	2 January 1842
		William Staveley; Acting	3 January 1842	21 November 1842
6		Sir William Maynard Gomm	21 November 1842	5 May 1849
		Thomas Blanchard; Acting	5 May 1849	8 June 1849
7		Sir George William Anderson	8 June 1849	19 October 1850
		William Sutherland; Acting	19 October 1850	8 January 1851
8		Sir James Macaulay Higginson	8 January 1851	20 September 1857
		William Sutherland; Acting for Higginson	14 April 1854	18 January 1855
		Charles Murray Hay; Acting for Higginson	18 January 1855	12 June 1855
9		Sir William Stevenson	20 September 1857	9 January 1863
		Montague Cholmeley Johnstone; Acting	10 January 1863	21 August 1863
10		Sir Henry Barkly	21 August 1863	3 June 1870
		Edward Selby Smyth; Acting	4 June 1870	21 February 1871
11		Sir Arthur Charles Hamilton-Gordon	21 February 1871	18 August 1874
		Edward Selby Smyth; Acting for Hamilton-Gordon	4 June 1870	21 February 1871
		Edward Norton; Acting for Hamilton-Gordon	21 October 1871	28 October 1872
		Edward Norton; Acting for Hamilton-Gordon	20 January 1873	20 October 1873
		Edward Norton; Acting	18 August 1874	21 September 1874
12		Sir Arthur Purves Phayre	21 September 1874	31 December 1878
		Sir Frederick Napier Broome; Acting	31 December 1878	4 April 1879
13		Sir George Ferguson Bowen	4 April 1879	9 December 1880
14		Sir Frederick Napier Broome	9 December 1880	5 May 1883
		Sir Charles Bruce; Acting	5 May 1883	1 June 1883
15		Sir John Pope Hennessy; Suspended from 14 December 1886 until 12 July 1887	1 June 1883	11 December 1889
		Henry Nicholas Duverger-Beyts; Acting for Hennessy	24 September 1884	15 October 1884
		Henry Nicholas Duverger-Beyts; Acting for Hennessy	29 September 1886	12 December 1886
		Sir Hercules George Robert Robinson; Acting for Hennessy	15 December 1886	18 December 1886
		William Hanbury Hawley; Acting for Hennessy	18 December 1886	2 July 1887
		Sir Francis Fleming; Acting for Hennessy	2 July 1887	11 December 1888
		Thomas Erskine Arthur Hall; Acting for Hennessy	11 December 1888	22 December 1888
		Sir Francis Fleming; Acting	11 December 1889	17 December 1889
		Thomas Erskine Arthur Hall; Acting	17 December 1889	20 December 1889
16		Sir Charles Cameron Lees	21 December 1889	12 March 1892
		Sir Hubert Edward Henry Jerningham; Acting	12 March 1892	20 September 1892
17		Sir Hubert Edward Henry Jerningham	20 September 1892	15 January 1897
		Charles Anthony King-Harman; Acting for Jerningham	17 January 1894	24 July 1894
		Charles Anthony King-Harman; Acting for Jerningham	2 March 1896	19 September 1896
		Charles Anthony King-Harman; Acting	15 January 1897	11 May 1897
18		Sir Charles Bruce	11 May 1897	30 October 1903
		Sir Graham John Bower; Acting for Bruce	12 July 1900	11 May 1901
		Sir Graham John Bower; Acting	30 October 1903	20 August 1904
19		Sir Charles Cavendish Boyle	20 August 1904	10 April 1911
		Sir Graham John Bower; Acting for Boyle	14 April 1906	14 September 1906
		Sir Graham John Bower; Acting for Boyle	17 October 1908	23 April 1909
		George Smith; Acting	10 April 1911	13 September 1911
20		Sir John Robert Chancellor	13 September 1911	28 January 1916
		Sir John Middleton; Acting for Chancellor	10 March 1914	22 September 1914
		Sir John Middleton; Acting for Chancellor	28 January 1916	18 May 1916
21		Sir Henry Hesketh Joudou Bell	18 May 1916	16 August 1924
		Sir John Middleton; Acting for Bell	8 February 1919	17 November 1919
		Sir Edward Brandis Denham; Acting for Bell	2 February 1921	3 April 1921
		Sir Edward Brandis Denham; Acting for Bell	8 May 1922	3 March 1923
		Sir Edward Allan Grannum; Acting	16 August 1924	19 February 1925
22		Sir Herbert James Read	19 February 1925	9 December 1929
		Sir Edward Allan Grannum; Acting for Read	2 September 1926	17 October 1926
		Sir Edward Allan Grannum; Acting for Read	3 August 1927	17 May 1928
		Sir Edward Allan Grannum; Acting	9 December 1929	30 August 1930
23		Sir Wilfrid Edward Francis Jackson	30 August 1930	7 June 1937
		Edward Walter Evans; Acting for Jackson	24 August 1932	29 April 1933
		Edward Walter Evans; Acting for Jackson	3 September 1934	26 October 1934
		Edward Walter Evans; Acting for Jackson	7 April 1936	4 December 1936
		Edward Walter Evans; Acting	7 June 1937	23 October 1937
24		Sir Bede Edward Hugh Clifford	23 October 1937	16 April 1942
		Sydney Moody; Acting for Clifford	29 January 1940	10 September 1940
		Sydney Moody; Acting	16 April 1942	5 July 1942 1940
25		Sir Donald Mackenzie-Kennedy	5 July 1942	5 December 1948
		Sydney Moody; Acting for Mackenzie-Kennedy	23 May 1945	3 January 1946
		Sydney Moody; Acting for Mackenzie-Kennedy	8 May 1947	10 January 1948
		Sir James Dundas Harford; Acting	5 December 1948	26 September 1949
26		Sir Hilary Blood	26 September 1949	11 January 1954
		Sir James Dundas Harford; Acting for Blood	26 June 1950	17 November 1950
		Sir James Dundas Harford; Acting for Blood	22 May 1952	14 October 1952
		Robert Newton; Acting	11 January 1954	22 March 1954
27		Sir Robert Scott	22 March 1954	10 July 1959
		Robert Newton; Acting for Scott	8 November 1956	18 April 1957
		Robert Newton; Acting	10 July 1959	2 November 1959
28		Sir Colville Montgomery Deverell	2 November 1959	10 July 1962
		Thomas Douglas Vickers; Acting for Deverell	11 June 1961	20 July 1961
		Thomas Douglas Vickers; Acting	10 July 1962	17 September 1962
29		Sir John Shaw Rennie	17 September 1962	12 March 1968
		Thomas Douglas Vickers; Acting for Rennie	24 August 1964	30 November 1964
		Thomas Douglas Vickers; Acting for Rennie	11 October 1966	28 December 1966

== Flag of the governor ==
Governor's flag, 1906–1968

Governor's flag, 1869–1906

== See also ==
- Governor of Mauritius
