= Vehicle registration plates of Kiribati =

- Country: Kiribati
- Country code: None

Current series
- Slogan: None
- Serial format: ABC; 123

Kiribati requires its residents to register their motor vehicles and display vehicle registration plates. Current plates are white on black. It is the duty of the owner to get the license plate made, so they are hand painted, stenciled or of printed laminated paper on a wooden base.

Image	First issued	Design	Serial format	Serials issued	Notes
		White on black	ABC123		
		White on black, with the coat of arms of Kiribati on the left	ABC; 123		
