= Hugh Henry Home Popham =

British poet and author

Hugh Popham
- Born: 15 May 1920; Beer, Devon, England
- Died: 30 June 1996 (aged 76); Tywardreath, Cornwall, England
- Education: Corpus Christi College, Cambridge
- Occupations: Poet; Author
- Years active: 1944–1991
- Children: Peter Popham; Amanda Popham
- Parents: Henry Bradshaw Popham; Millicent Collyer

Hugh Popham (15 May 1920 – 30 June 1996) was a British poet and author.

== Selected works ==
- Against the Lightning. John Lane. 1944.
- Beyond the Eagle's Rage. Bodley Head. 1951.
- Sea Eagles. Seaforth. 1954.
