= List of governors of Trinidad and Tobago =

Flag of the governor of Trinidad and Tobago (1889–1958)

Flag of the governor of Trinidad and Tobago (1958–1962)

This article lists governors of Trinidad and Tobago.

== Governors of Trinidad and Tobago 1889–1962 ==
Term	Image	Incumbent	Notes
1 January 1889 – 1891		Sir William Robinson	had been governor of Trinidad since 1885
19 August 1891 – 1896		Sir Frederick Napier Broome	
2 June 1897 – December, 1900		Sir Hubert Edward Henry Jerningham	
4 December 1900 – August 1904		Sir Cornelius Alfred Moloney	
30 August 1904 – 29 August 1908		Sir Henry Moore Jackson	
11 May 1909 – January 1916		Sir George Ruthven Le Hunte	
1 June 1916 – 31 December 1921		Sir John Robert Chancellor	
1 January 1922 – 1924		Sir Samuel Herbert Wilson	
22 November 1924 – 1930		Sir Horace Archer Byatt	
22 March 1930 – 1936		Sir Alfred Claud Hollis	
17 September 1936 – 10 January 1938		Sir Murchison Fletcher	
8 July 1938 – 1942		Sir Hubert Winthrop Young	
8 June 1942 – 1947		Sir Bede Edmund Hugh Clifford	
7 March 1947 – 1950		Sir John Valentine Wistar Shaw	
19 April 1950 – 1955		Sir Hubert Elvin Rance	
23 June 1955 – 1960		Sir Edward Betham Beetham	
4 July 1960 – 31 August 1962		Sir Solomon Hochoy	

== See also ==
- List of governors of Trinidad
- List of governors of Tobago
- List of heads of state of Trinidad and Tobago
- List of prime ministers of Trinidad and Tobago
