= A Pattern of Islands =

- First UK edition (publ. John Murray)
- Author: Arthur Grimble
- Language: English
- Genre: Memoir
- Published: 1952
- Publisher: John Murray

A Pattern of Islands (also known as We Chose the Islands in American editions) is a memoir by Sir Arthur Grimble recounting his time in the Gilbert and Ellice Islands as a cadet officer and Resident Commissioner between 1914 and 1933. The book, which was first published by John Murray in 1952 and was republished by Eland in 2010, gives an attractive account of island life and colonial rule, based on Grimble's extensive engagement with the islanders. The book was adapted as a film, Pacific Destiny, released in 1956, and Grimble wrote a sequel, Return to the Islands.
