= Colin Allan =

New Zealand author and lecturer

Sir Colin Allan KCMG OBE

9th British Resident Commissioner of the New Hebrides
- In office 1966–1973
- Monarch: Elizabeth II
- Preceded by: Alexander Mair Wilkie
- Succeeded by: Roger William Houssemayne du Boulay

19th Governor of the Seychelles
- In office 1973 – 1 October 1975
- Monarch: Elizabeth II
- Preceded by: Sir Bruce Greatbatch
- Succeeded by: Himself as High Commissioner to the Seychelles

1st High Commissioner to the Seychelles
- In office 1 October 1975 – 28 June 1976
- Monarch: Elizabeth II
- Preceded by: Himself as Governor of the Seychelles
- Succeeded by: None (position abolished)

7th Governor of the Solomon Islands
- In office 1976 – 7 July 1978
- Monarch: Elizabeth II
- Chief Minister: Sir Peter Kenilorea
- Preceded by: Sir Donald Luddington
- Succeeded by: Sir Braddeley Devesi as Governor-General of the Solomon Islands

Personal details
- Born: Colin Hamilton Allan; 23 October 1921 Wellington, New Zealand
- Died: 5 March 1993 (aged 71) Howick, Auckland, New Zealand
- Spouse: Betty Evans (m. 1955)
- Children: 3 sons
- Education: Canterbury University College; Magdalene College, Cambridge
- Occupation: Naval officer, colonial administrator

Sir Colin Hamilton Allan KCMG OBE (23 October 1921 – 5 March 1993) was a New Zealander who spent most of his professional life in the British administration of overseas territories. He was the last Governor of the Seychelles from 1973 to 1975 and then from 1976 to 1978 the last Governor of the Solomon Islands, before their independence.

== Early life ==
Allan was born in Wellington on 23 October 1921, the son of John Calder Allan and Mabel Eastwood.

He was educated at the Cambridge Primary School and Hamilton High School. He obtained a Bachelor of Arts degree from Canterbury University College in 1943 and then graduated Master of Arts in 1945. He also obtained a Diploma in Anthropology from Magdalene College, Cambridge.

In 1942, during the Second World War, Allan joined the Royal New Zealand Navy in Wellington. He transferred to the New Zealand Signals the same year and was in the Army Education Service until 1944, holding the rank of lance corporal. In 1945, he was posted to the British Solomon Islands Protectorate Defence Force where he served as a lieutenant until 1946.

Allan married Betty Evans in 1955. They had three sons: Timothy, Johnathan and Christopher.

== Colonial Service ==
Towards the end of the Second World War, the British Colonial Service had a large number of vacancies in some fifty dependent territories around the world. Restoration of basic civilian administration was a priority for the Service, particularly in those countries that had been invaded. The post-war period was a particularly difficult one for the Colonial Service, with independence movements springing up around the Empire, and it welcomed applications from the Dominions.

Allan was appointed and was posted to the British Solomon Islands Protectorate as an Administrative Officer (Cadet), then the same year as District Officer on Nggela.

He served in the Western Solomons (1946), Ysabel and Choiseul (1948), and Malaita in 1949. From 1947 to 1948 he was District Commissioner for the Western Solomons. He became District Commissioner for Malaita in 1952. From 1953 to 1954 he was Special Lands Commissioner. By 1954, Allan had organised the first Council of Malaita for the local population. This effectively ended the influence of the Marching Rule.

From 1954 to 1955 Allan was attached to the Western Pacific High Commission's Secretariat (Finance and Development). He became Senior Assistant Secretary in 1955. Appointed to the Special Lands Commission from 1956 to 1957, member and Secretary BSIP Agriculture and Industry Loans Board (1956–1957), Secretary for Protectorate Affairs (1957–1958), Chairman BSIP Copra Marketing Board (1957–1958), and UK member of the South Pacific Commission Research Council (1958).

In 1957, Allan wrote a book called Customary Land Tenure in the British Solomon Islands Protectorate in which he outlined the native land ownership.

Allan was Assistant British Resident Commissioner to the New Hebrides (now Vanuatu) from 1959 to 1966 and British Resident Commissioner from 1966 to 1973. Allan's residence was on Iririki by Port Vila.

=== Governor of the Seychelles ===
In 1973, Allan was appointed Governor of the Seychelles, a post he held until 1 October 1975 when he was appointed High Commissioner from 1 October 1975 to 28 June 1976, when the Seychelles became an independent republic.

=== Governor of the Solomon Islands ===
Allan was appointed Governor of the Solomon Islands from 1976 to 1978. His appointment ended when the Solomons gained their independence in 1978.

== Retirement ==
When Allan retired, the Australian National University and the Universities of Auckland, Otago, and New South Wales all invited him as a visiting lecturer or fellow.

Allan was appointed an Officer of the Order of the British Empire in the 1959 New Year Honours, a Companion of the Order of St Michael and St George in the 1968 Birthday Honours, and a Knight Commander of the Order of St Michael and St George in the 1977 Birthday Honours. He was also appointed as a Commander of the French Ordre National du Mérite.

He died on 5 March 1993 at Howick, New Zealand.

== Publications ==
- Solomons safari 1953–58, Christchurch, Nag's Head Press (1990)
