= Arthur Alban Wright =

British colonial administrator

Arthur Alban Wright, CMG (24 October 1887 – 4 January 1967) was a British colonial administrator who served in Fiji and in the Caribbean. He was Administrator of St Vincent from 1936 to 1938 and Administrator of St Lucia from 1938 to 1943.

== Life and career ==
Wright was the son of the Rev. Alban Henry Wright, organising secretary of the Society for the Propagation of the Gospel in Foreign Parts. He was educated at St Edmund's School, Canterbury and St John's College, Oxford.

He entered the Colonial Civil Service in 1912 and was posted to Fiji as a cadet the same year. In 1915, he was promoted to District Commissioner. During the First World War, he was commissioned into the Rifle Brigade as a second lieutenant in 1917. After the war, he became Provincial Commissioner in Fiji in 1922, Assistant Colonial Secretary in 1928, Secretary for Native Affairs in 1932, Acting Colonial Secretary in 1932–34, and Acting Governor of Fiji in 1935.

In 1936, he was transferred to the Caribbean and was Administrator of St Vincent, serving there until 1938, when he was appointed Administrator of St Lucia. He was Acting Governor of the Windward Islands in 1938 and 1939. He retired from the Colonial Service in 1943. After his retirement, he was managing director of the Jamaica Starch and Milling Co. Ltd from 1944 to 1946. He died in Ascot in 1967.

Wright was appointed a Companion of the Order of St Michael and St George in 1937.

== Family ==
In 1914, Wright married Margaret Emily Booth, eldest daughter of Robert Malcolm Booth; they had three daughters.
