= Robert Arundell =

British diplomat

Brigadier Sir Robert Arundell KCMG OBE
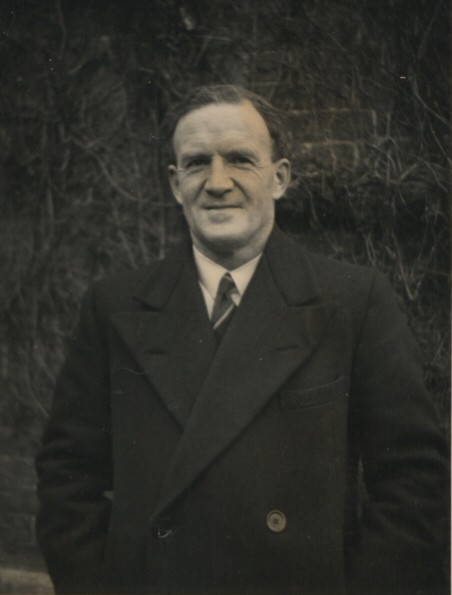

Governor of Barbados
- In office 14 May 1953 – 1959
- Monarch: Elizabeth II
- Premier: Hugh Gordon Cummins; Grantley Herbert Adams
- Preceded by: Sir Alfred Savage
- Succeeded by: Sir John Montague Stow

Governor of the Windward Islands
- In office 1948–1953
- Monarch: Elizabeth II
- Preceded by: Sir Arthur Grimble
- Succeeded by: Edward Beetham

Personal details
- Born: 22 July 1904 Lifton, Devon, United Kingdom
- Died: 24 March 1989 (aged 84) Taunton, Somerset, United Kingdom
- Spouse: Joan Ingles
- Children: 2
- Education: Brasenose College, Oxford

Brigadier Sir Robert Duncan Harris Arundell, KCMG, OBE (22 July 1904 – 24 March 1989) was a British diplomat who became governor and commander in chief of the Windward Islands and later Governor of Barbados and acting governor-general of the West Indies.

== Early life ==
Robert Duncan Harris Arundell was born on 22 July 1904 at Lifton, Devon, the son of Constantine Harris Arundell (1862–1945) and his wife Katherine Juliana (1865–1957), daughter of the Reverend Robert Hole, rector of North Tawton. He was educated at Blundell's School in Tiverton and at Brasenose College, Oxford. A member of the Blundell's team from 1921 to 1923, he also played cricket for Devon in the Minor Counties Championship in 1922.

== Career ==
Arundell joined the Colonial Service, eventually becoming assistant chief secretary, Uganda. He was seconded to the Forces in 1941 for appointment to occupied territory administration, and, in 1945, was chief civil affairs officer, Middle East, with the rank of brigadier.

In 1946 Arundell was appointed British resident member in Washington of the Anglo-American Caribbean Commission and head of the British Colonies Supply Mission, later to become resident member in Washington of the British national section of the Caribbean Commission. He later reverted to his appointment in Uganda.

Arundell was appointed governor and commander in chief of the Windward Islands in succession to Sir Arthur Grimble and later Governor of Barbados and acting governor-general of the West Indies. He retired in 1960.

In 1961, he sold his house, Court Green, in North Tawton to Sylvia Plath and Ted Hughes.

In 1962, Arundell was appointed delimitation commissioner to make recommendations for the division of the Zanzibar Protectorate into constituencies for the Legislative Council elections, and for their delimitation in accordance with the report of that year’s Zanzibar constitutional conference.

== Family ==
On 14 November 1929, he married Joan (1904–1984), daughter of Captain John Alexander Ingles, Royal Navy, and his wife Annie Marie Dease. They had two sons. He died on 24 March 1989 in Taunton.

== Sources ==
- The Times, Monday, 7 October 1957 (pg. 14; Issue 53965; col A)
- The Times, Thursday 26 July 1962 (pg. 11; Issue 55453; col F)
