= Charles Bruton =

English colonial administrator

Personal information
- Born: 6 April 1890; Wotton, Gloucester
- Died: 26 March 1969 (aged 78); Henley-on-Thames, Oxfordshire
- Batting: Right-handed

Domestic team information
- Years: Team
- 1922: Gloucestershire
- Source: Cricinfo, 26 March 2014

Charles Lamb Bruton (6 April 1890 – 26 March 1969) was an English colonial administrator.

== Life ==
Born in Gloucester on 6 April 1890, he was the son of Henry William Bruton, and was educated at Radley College and Keble College, Oxford. He was then secretary to Luke Paget, Bishop of Stepney, in 1913–4.

Bruton was in Uganda as Assistant District Commissioner (1914), District Commissioner (1924), and Provincial Commissioner of the Eastern Province (1936). He was then in Swaziland from 1937 to 1942, as Resident Commissioner, and then served as Commissioner of the East African Refugee Administration, retiring in 1947. He later lived at Shiplake-on-Thames.

Bruton played for Gloucestershire in 1922.

Government offices
| Preceded by Allan Graham Marwick | Resident Commissioner of Swaziland; 1937 – 1942 | Succeeded by Eric Kellett Featherstone |
