= Edward Beetham =

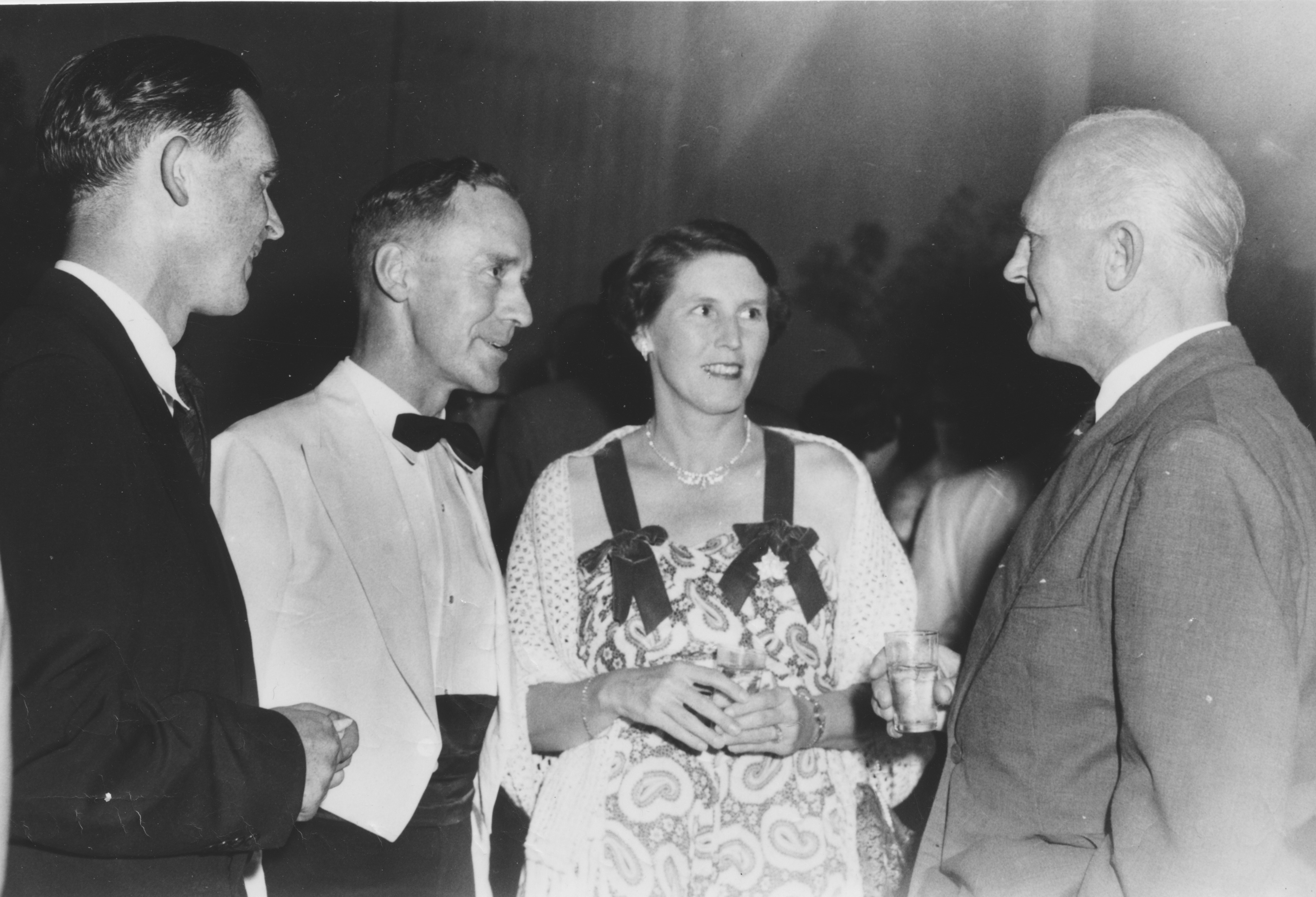
- Dave Laughton, Ted Hill, Eleanor Hill, Sir Edward Beetham, Governor of Trinidad & Tobago, 1957

Governor of Trinidad and Tonago
- In office 23 June 1955 – 1960
- Monarch: Elizabeth II
- Preceded by: Sir Hubert Rance
- Succeeded by: Sir Solomon Hochoy

Governor of the Windward Islands
- In office 1953–1955
- Monarch: Elizabeth II
- Preceded by: Brigadier Sir Robert Arundell
- Succeeded by: Sir Colville Deverell

Resident Commissioner of Bechuanaland
- In office 1950–1953
- Monarchs: George VI; Elizabeth II
- Preceded by: Anthony Sillery
- Succeeded by: Martin Osterfield Wray

Resident Commissioner of Swaziland
- In office 25 August 1946 – 1950
- Monarch: George VI
- Preceded by: Eric Kellett Featherstone
- Succeeded by: David Loftus Morgan

Personal details
- Born: Edward Betham Beetham; 19 February 1905
- Died: 19 February 1979 (aged 74)
- Occupation: Colonial official

Sir Edward Betham Beetham KCMG CVO OBE (19 February 1905 – 19 February 1979) was a British colonial official who served as Resident Commissioner in Swaziland from 1946 to 1950 and in the Bechuanaland Protectorate from 1950 to 1953.

He was educated at Charterhouse School and Lincoln College, Oxford. He was Governor of the Windward Islands 1953–55 and Governor of Trinidad and Tobago 1955–60, where he presided over the transition to elected internal self-government. Beetham was the last British colonial governor of Trinidad and Tobago of British descent. The Beetham Highway in Port of Spain is named after him.

Government offices
Preceded by Eric Kellett Featherstone	Resident Commissioner in Swaziland; 1946-1950	Succeeded by David Loftus Morgan
Preceded by Sir Robert Arundell	Governor of the Windward Islands; 1953–1955	Succeeded by Sir Colville Deverell
Preceded by Sir Hubert Rance	Governor of Trinidad and Tobago; 1955–1960	Succeeded by Sir Solomon Hochoy
