= Frederick Broome =

Colonial administrator (1842–1896)

Sir Frederick Broome KCMG
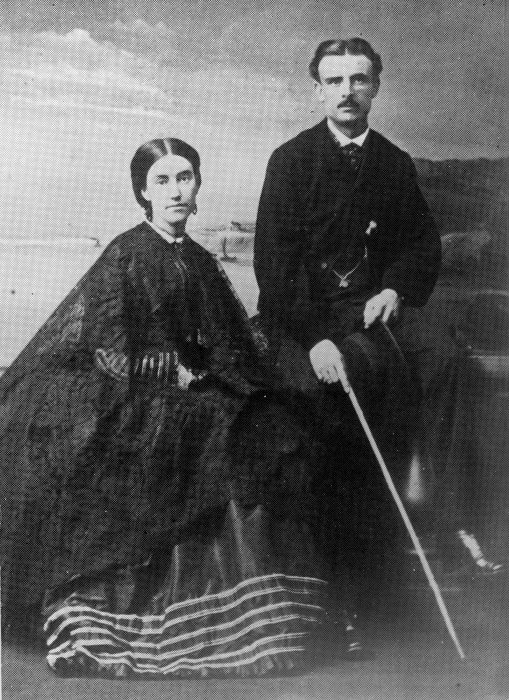
- Frederick Broome with his wife, Mary Anne Barker; circa 1866

Governor of Trinidad and Tobago
- In office 1891–1896
- Monarch: Victoria
- Preceded by: Sir William Robinson
- Succeeded by: Sir Hubert Jerningham

Governor of Western Australia
- In office 1883–1889
- Monarch: Victoria
- Preceded by: Sir William Robinson
- Succeeded by: Sir William Robinson

Governor of Mauritius
- In office 1880–1883
- Monarch: Victoria
- Preceded by: Sir George Bowen
- Succeeded by: Sir John Pope Hennessy

Personal details
- Born: 18 November 1842 Canada
- Died: 26 November 1896 (aged 54) London, England

Sir Frederick Napier Broome KCMG (18 November 1842 – 26 November 1896) was a colonial administrator in the British Empire, serving in Natal, Mauritius, Western Australia, Barbados and Trinidad and Tobago. The Western Australian towns of Broome and Broomehill are named after him. He has signed his name as F. Napier Broome.

== Early life ==
The eldest son of Rev. Frederick Broome, rector of Kenley, Shropshire, by his wife Catherine Eleanor (eldest daughter of Lieut.-Colonel Napier, formerly Superintendent, Indian Department, Canada), Broome was born in Canada and educated at Whitchurch Grammar School, Shropshire. When visiting England in 1865, he married Mary Anne Barker on 21 June. The couple moved to New Zealand where Broome had a sheep station, in the Malvern Hills, province of Canterbury.

== Career ==
=== Journalist and poet ===
Broome returned to London in 1869, and for the following six years was a regular contributor to The Times, being the newspaper's correspondent at the Duke of Edinburgh's marriage at St. Petersburg, and on many other occasions. He also wrote literary reviews, art critiques, and miscellaneous articles. He published two volumes of verse, Poems from New Zealand (1868) and The Stranger of Seriphos (1869), and contributed verse to the Cornhill, Macmillan's Magazine, and other periodicals.

=== Administrator ===
In 1870 he was appointed secretary to the St. Paul's Cathedral Completion Fund, and, in 1873, secretary to the Royal Commission on Unseaworthy Ships, and held for some time a commission in the Essex yeomanry. He was selected by the Earl of Carnarvon, in 1875, to proceed with Lord Garnet Wolseley on a special mission to Natal, as colonial secretary of that colony. He held that post until 1878, when he was promoted to the colonial secretaryship of Mauritius, where he administered the government in 1879, and was lieutenant-governor of the island from 1880 to 1888. He was the 14th governor of Mauritius from 9 Dec 1880 to 5 May 1883. He was created CMG in 1877, and KCMG in 1884.

On receiving the news of Britain's military disaster at Isandlwana (1879), he despatched at once to the assistance of Lord Chelmsford nearly the whole of the garrison of the colony, including a half battery of artillery, For which he was warmly thanked by the governor and high commissioner of the Cape Colony, Sir Bartle Frere, and by the colony of Natal through its lieutenant governor, Sir Henry Bulwer.

=== Governor of Western Australia, Barbados and Trinidad ===
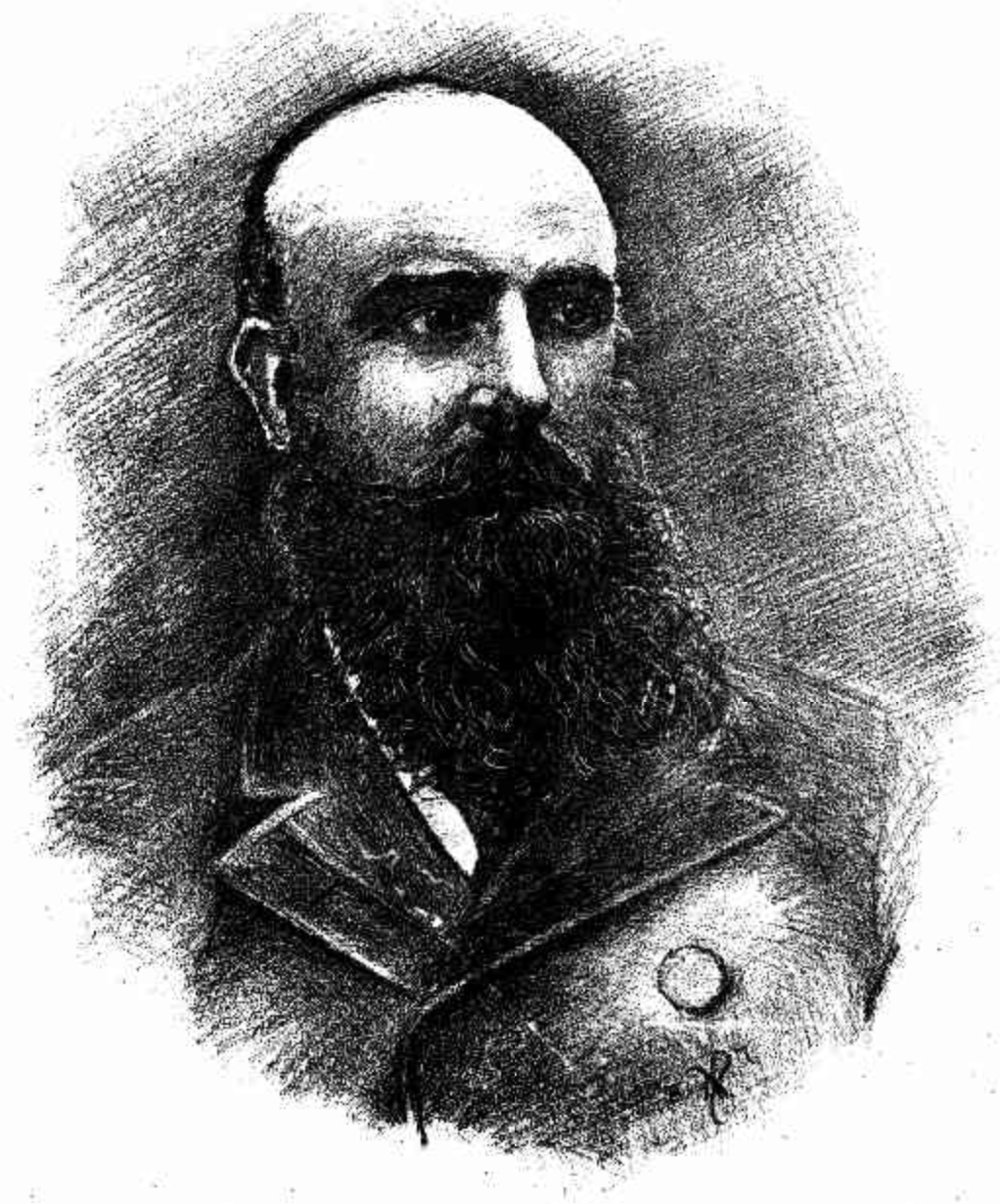
Frederick Broome (1887)

On 14 December 1882 he was appointed governor of Western Australia, and assumed office in June 1883. He visited England in 1885, when, with the "view of extending knowledge of the resources of what was at that time a little known colony", he read a paper on "Western Australia" before the Colonial Institute, H.R.H. the Prince of Wales taking the chair. That year he donated a small but important collection of Aboriginal artefacts from Western Australia to the British Museum.

His term as governor of Western Australia was marked by great extension of railways and telegraphs, and general progress. When the colony was preparing for responsible government, Broome acted as intermediary between the Legislative Council and the British secretary of state. After considerable correspondence, the details of the new constitution were settled, and a bill, approved by Her Majesty's Government, finally passed the local legislature in 1889. Since complementary legislation was needed from Westminster to transfer Crown lands to the colonial legislature, the necessary bill was at once introduced by Lord Knutsford, and passed the House of Lords; but, owing to strong opposition to handing over an immense tract of Crown lands to the colonists, which suddenly showed itself in the home press and in the House of Commons, the bill could not be proceeded with in the House in 1889, and had to be deferred to the following year.

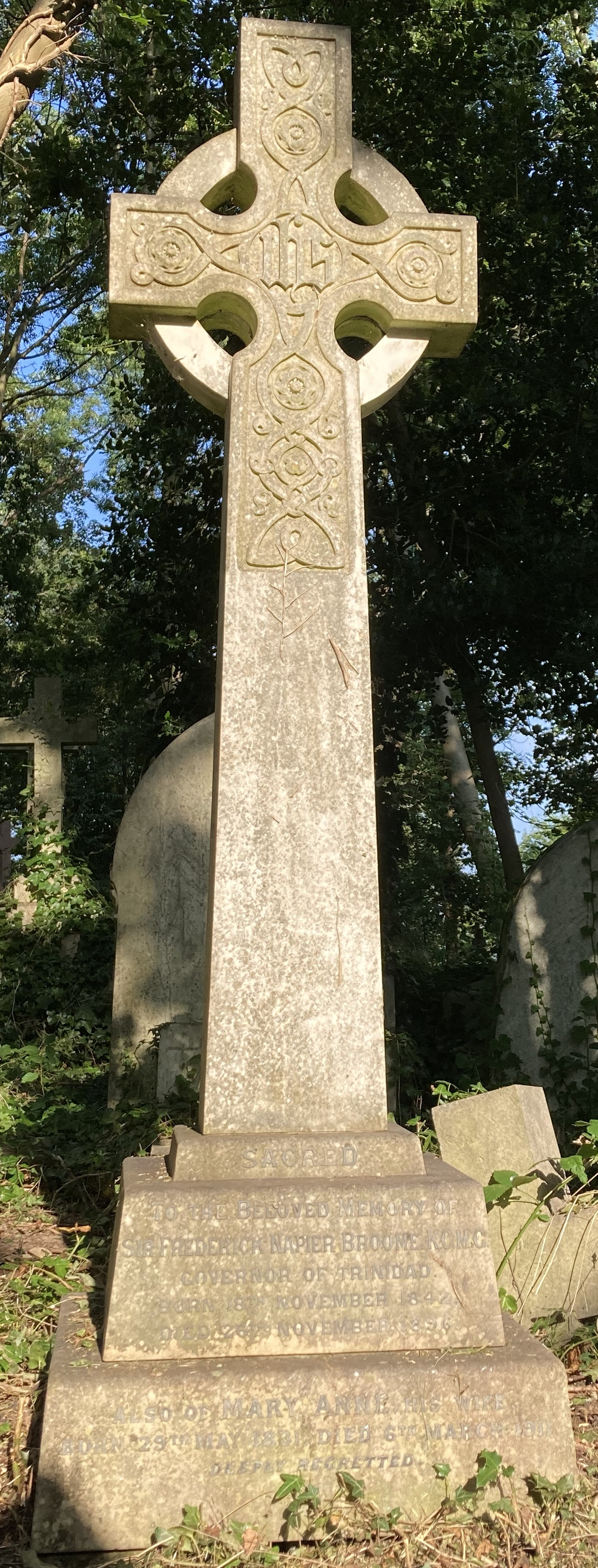
Grave of Frederick Broome in Highgate Cemetery

Sir Frederick and two leading members of the Western Australian legislature travelled to England in December 1889 to give evidence before a select committee of the House of Commons, to which, early in the session of 1890, the Constitution Bill was referred. Much to the surprise of the London press, the committee reported in favour of the bill and of the transfer of all lands to the colony.

Consequently, the British Parliament passed a bill for the whole of the lands of the vast territory—1,060,000 square miles—to be freely handed over to the legislature of Western Australia, which thus obtained its new constitution on the same basis as the other colonies of the continent, there being no opposition to the bill in the House of Lords. Broome finally left Western Australia in December 1889, on a mission to England in connection with the Constitution Bill, and his tenure as governor ended in September 1890. One source states "Disputes with his senior officials tarnished Broome's reputation in the Colonial Office.

Broome was transferred to serve as acting governor of Barbados in the West Indies and, in July 1891, was appointed governor of Trinidad. Broome Street in Woodbrook, a suburb of Port of Spain, Trinidad, is named after him.

He died in London in 1896 and was buried on the eastern side of Highgate Cemetery.

Government offices
Preceded by Sir George Bowen	Governor of Mauritius; 1880–1883	Succeeded by Sir John Pope Hennessy
Preceded by Sir William Robinson	Governor of Western Australia; 1883–1889	Succeeded by Sir William Robinson
