= Herbert James Read =

British colonial governor (1863–1949)

Sir Herbert James Read GCMG CB (1863–1949) was the 22nd Governor of Mauritius from 19 February 1925 to 9 December 1929.

Government offices
Preceded by Sir Henry Hesketh Joudou Bell	Governor of Mauritius; 1925–1929	Succeeded by Sir Wilfrid Edward Francis Jackson
