= Colville Deverell =

Irish cricketer and colonial administrator

Coville Deverell

28th Governor of British Mauritius
- In office 2 November 1959 – 10 July 1962
- Preceded by: Sir Robert Scott
- Succeeded by: Sir John Shaw Rennie

Governor of the Windward Islands
- In office 1955 – 1 January 1960 de jure from 3 January 1958
- Preceded by: Edward Betham Beetham
- Succeeded by: Position Abolished

Personal details
- Born: February 21, 1907 Dublin, Ireland
- Died: 1995 (aged 87–88)

Sir Colville Montgomery Deverell GBE KCMG CVO (21 February 1907 in Dublin, Ireland – 18 December 1995 in Wokingham, Berkshire, England) was an Irish cricketer and colonial administrator.

== Cricket ==
A right-handed batsman, he played just once for the Ireland cricket team, against the MCC in August 1930. He played one first-class match, playing for Dublin University against Northamptonshire in 1926. In the match, he opened the batting with Irish playwright Samuel Beckett.

== Politics ==
Later in life, he served as Governor of the Windward Islands. He was 28th Governor of Mauritius from 2 November 1959 to 10 July 1962.

He was secretary-general of the International Planned Parenthood Federation.

== Honours ==
- Officer of the Order of the British Empire (OBE), 1946
- Commander of the Royal Victorian Order (CVO), 1953
- Companion of the Order of St Michael and St George (CMG), 1955
- Knight Commander of the Order of St Michael and St George (KCMG), 1957
- Knight Grand Cross of the Order of the British Empire (GBE), 1963

Government offices
Preceded by Edward Betham Beetham	Governor of the Windward Islands; 1955–1 January 1960	Territory dissolved
Preceded by Sir Robert Scott	Governor of Mauritius; 1959–1962	Succeeded by Sir John Shaw Rennie
