= Hubert Jerningham =

British Liberal Party politician

Sir Hubert Jerningham KCMG DL
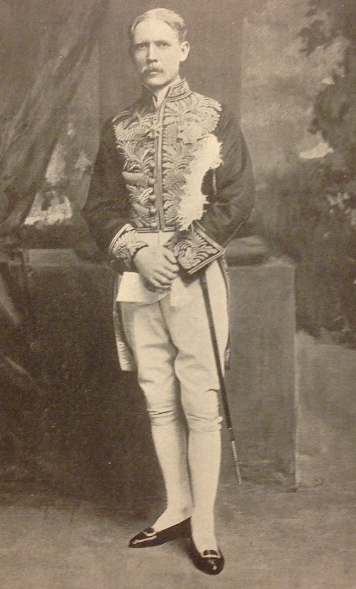

Governor of Trinidad and Tobago
- In office 1897–1900
- Monarch: Victoria
- Preceded by: Sir Frederick Broome
- Succeeded by: Sir Cornelius Alfred Moloney

Governor of Mauritius
- In office 1892–1897
- Monarch: Victoria
- Preceded by: Sir Charles Lees
- Succeeded by: Sir Charles Bruce

Personal details
- Born: 18 October 1842
- Died: 3 April 1914 (aged 71)

Sir Hubert Edward Henry Jerningham, KCMG, DL (18 October 1842 – 3 April 1914) was a British Liberal Party politician and Governor of Mauritius 1892–1897, then Governor of Trinidad and Tobago between 1897 and 1900.

== Biography ==
Jerningham was the great-grandson of Nathaniel Middleton. His great-grandmother, Anne, was the daughter of a 'Jamaican of colour' called Elizabeth Augier.

He served as the Member of Parliament (MP) for Berwick-upon-Tweed from 1881 to 1885.

He was appointed the 17th Governor of Mauritius, from 21 September 1892 to 15 January 1897, having been previously acting in the role from 12 March 1892 to 20 September 1892.

In June 1897 he was appointed Governor of Trinidad and Tobago, serving as such until December 1900. While he was Governor, the Trinidad Government Railway was extended from Cunupia to Tabaquite. The railway junction formed by this extension was named Jerningham Junction. He also instituted an award for the top student in the Island Scholarship examinations, a gold medal called the Jerningham Medal (today known as the President's Medal). Jerningham advised the Colonial Office to suspend the charter of the Borough of Port of Spain in 1898 following a dispute with the Borough Council. The borough charter was suspended on 1 January 1899; the suspension remained in effect until 1914. This action made Jerningham very unpopular with the population. Jerningham Avenue in Belmont, a suburb of Port of Spain, Trinidad, is named after him.

Jerningham was appointed a deputy lieutenant of Northumberland on 21 May 1901, after his return to the United Kingdom. He was received in a customary stepping down audience by King Edward VII in January 1902. He settled at Longridge Towers, where he had erected a stately home, said to among the largest private houses in that part of the country.

== Family ==
Jerningham married in 1874 Annie Liddell, daughter of Edward Liddell, of Benton Park, Northumberland. She was the widow of Charles Mather, and had inherited the Longridge Towers estate near Berwick-upon-Tweed and other property from her first husband. Lady Jerningham died at Longridge Towers on 9 October 1902.

== Sources ==
- Anthony, Michael (2001). Historical Dictionary of Trinidad and Tobago. Scarecrow Press, Inc. Lanham, Md., and London. ISBN 0-8108-3173-2.
- Historical list of MPs: B, part 2

Parliament of the United Kingdom
Preceded by David Milne Home; Dudley Marjoribanks	Member of Parliament for Berwick-upon-Tweed; 1881–1885; With: David Milne Home	Succeeded by Sir Edward Grey
Political offices
Preceded by Sir Charles Cameron Lees	Governor of Mauritius; 1892–1897	Succeeded by Sir Charles Bruce
Preceded by Frederick Napier Broome	Governor of Trinidad and Tobago; 1897–1900	Succeeded by Cornelius Alfred Moloney
