= Herbert Reginald McClure =

British colonial administrator

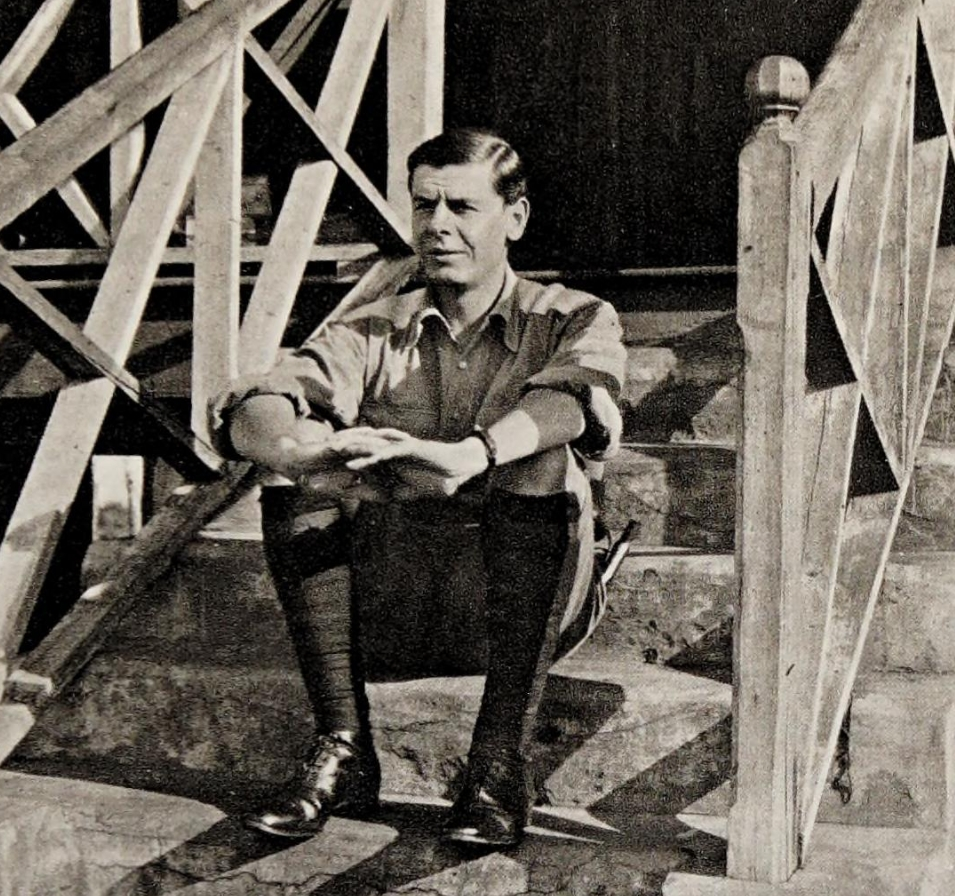
- Photograph taken by Richard Meinertzhagen, 1906

Resident Commissioner of the Gilbert and Ellice Islands
- In office April 1920 – 1 January 1925
- Preceded by: Edward Carlyon Eliot
- Succeeded by: Arthur Grimble

Personal details
- Born: 23 March 1883
- Died: 1 January 1925 Sydney, Australia
- Occupation: Colonial Service

Herbert Reginald McClure (23 March 1883 – 1 January 1925) was a British Colonial Service administrator who served in Kenya and later as Resident Commissioner of the Gilbert and Ellice Islands. He joined the Royal Navy and was appointed as Acting Sub-Lieutenant on 15 January 1898. He trained as an officer cadet at Britannia Royal Naval College, Dartmouth, when the wooden hulk HMS Britannia was the barracks. He "passed out" (graduated) following examinations in April 1899.

He joined the Colonial Service. He was appointed as the District Commissioner of Nyeri in Kenya in 1914. During his tenure, McClure was noted in colonial reports for his administrative work on land tenure and local governance within the reserve. He was appointed Resident Commissioner of the Gilbert and Ellice Islands Colony in February 1922.He died in Sydney, Australia, on 1 January 1925 while staying at the Wentworth Hotel.

== Selected works ==
- McClure, Herbert Reginald (1 January 1925). Land-travel and seafaring: A frivolous record of twenty years wanderings. London: Hutchinson & Co. ASIN B00086ZQW8.
