= Robert Scott (colonial administrator) =

Governor of Mauritius from 1954 to 1959

Sir Robert Scott, KCMG (10 March 1903 – 28 May 1968) was a British colonial governor who served as the 27th Governor of Mauritius, 22 March 1954 to 10 July 1959. He wrote a history of the islands called Limuria: The Lesser Dependencies of Mauritius.

Scott was educated at Highgate School and Balliol College, Oxford, where he read Modern History.

He was appointed CMG in 1945, a Knight Bachelor in the 1953 New Year Honours, while he was Administrator at the East Africa High Commission, and KCMG in the 1954 Birthday Honours.

Government offices
Preceded by Sir Hilary Rudolph Robert Blood	Governor of Mauritius; 1954–1959	Succeeded by Sir Colville Montgomery Deverell
