= John Campbell Lees =

Sir John Campbell Lees (27 January 1793 – 17 October 1873) was an English lawyer and colonial judge.

He served as Chief Justice of the Bahamas from 1836 or 1837 to 1865. He was also a judge of the Vice Admiralty Court of the Bahamas. Lees was knighted in 1865.

He died suddenly on 17 October 1873 while travelling on the London Underground. His son, Sir Charles Cameron Lees, served as the governor of a number of British colonies and possessions between 1874 and 1895.
