= List of colonial governors and administrators of Seychelles =

Flag of the governor of Seychelles (1903–1961)

Flag of the governor of Seychelles (1961–1976)

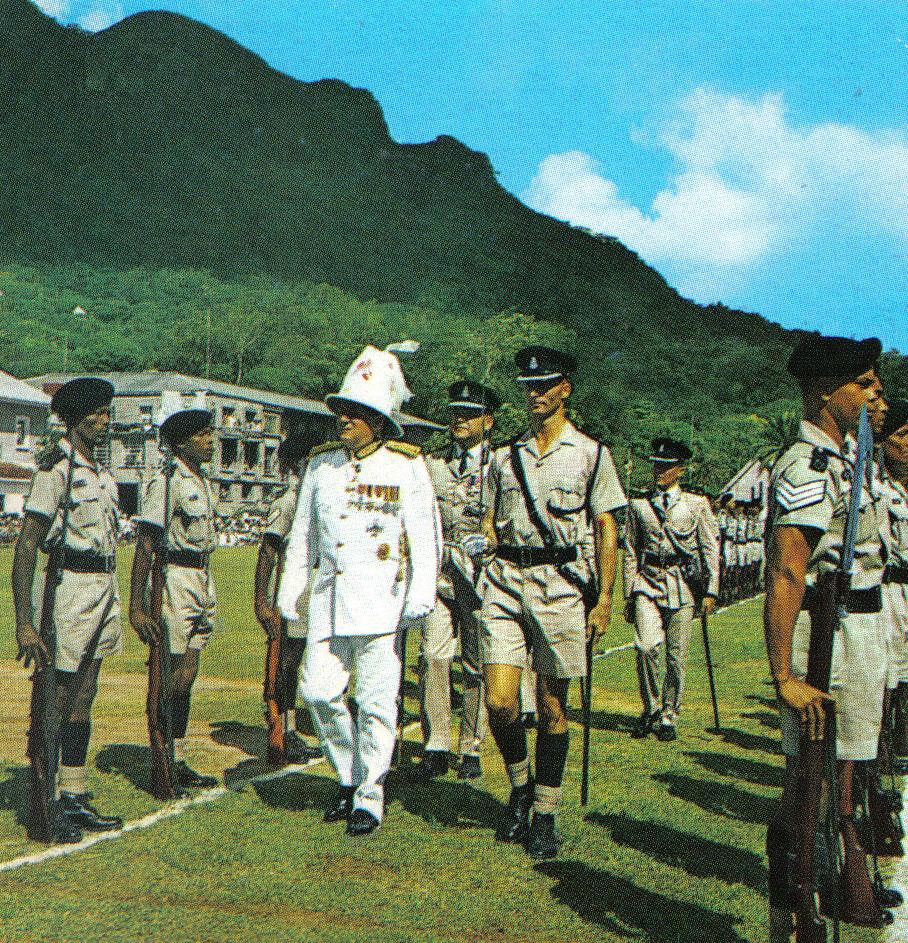
Sir Bruce Greatbatch, colonial governor of the Seychelles, inspecting police guard of honour in 1972

This is a list of colonial governors of Seychelles, an archipelagic island country in the Indian Ocean. Seychelles was first colonised by the French in 1770, and captured by the British in 1810, who governed it under the subordination to Mauritius until 1903, when it became a separate crown colony. Seychelles achieved independence from the United Kingdom on 29 June 1976.

== List of governors ==
Italics indicate de facto continuation of office

Tenure	Portrait	Incumbent	Notes
French Suzerainty
French colony, subordinated to Île de France (Mauritius)
21 November 1742	Claimed for France by Lazare Picault, named Îles de La Bourdonnais, not settled		
1 November 1756	Annexed by France (Îles de Séchelles), not settled until 27 August 1770		
27 August 1770 to 1772		Jean-Charles de Launay de La Perrière, Commandant	
1772 to 1775		Joseph François Eugène Benjamin Anselme, Commandant	
1775 to 1777		Jean-Baptiste Le Roux de Kermeseven, Commandant	
1778 to 1781		Charles Routier de Romainville, Commandant	
1781 to 1783		Louis François Claude Berthelot de la Coste, Commandant	
1783 to 1786		François, vicomte de Souillac, Commandant	
1786 to 1789		Augustin Motais de Narbonne, Commandant	
1789 to 1792		Louis Jean Baptiste Philogène de Malavois, Commandant	
1792 to 1793		Charles Joseph Esnouf, Commandant	
9 September 1793 to 17 May 1810		Jean-Baptiste Quéau de Quincy, Governor	Îles de Séchelles occupied by United Kingdom on 17 May 1794 (French administration continues to 17 May 1810)
British Suzerainty
British colony, subordinated to Mauritius
17 May 1810 to 2 June 1811		Jean-Baptiste Quéau de Quincy, Commissioner	
2 June 1811 to 1812		Bartholomew Sullivan, Commissioner	
1812 to 1815		Bibye Lasage, Commissioner	
1815 to 1822		Edward Henry Madge, Commissioner	
1822 to 1837		George Harrison, Commissioner	
1837 to 1839		Arthur Wilson, Commissioner	
1839 to 1850		Charles Augustus Etienne Mylius, Commissioner	
1850 to 1852		Robert William Keate, Commissioner	
1852 to 1862		Charles William Bhering, Viscount Bhering, Commissioner	
1862 to 1868		Swinburne Ward, Commissioner	
1868 to 1874		William Hales Franklyn, Commissioner	
1874 to 1879		Charles Spencer Salmon, Commissioner	
1879 to 1880		Arthur Havelock, Commissioner	
1880 to 1882		Francis Theophilus Blunt, Commissioner	
1882 to 1888		Arthur Cecil Stuart Barkly, Commissioner	
1889 to 1895		Thomas Risely Griffith, Administrator	
1895 to August 1899		Henry Cockburn Stewart, Administrator	
August 1899 to 31 August 1903		Ernest Bickham Sweet-Escott, Administrator	
British crown colony
31 August 1903 to November 1903		Ernest Bickham Sweet-Escott, Administrator	
November 1903 to 1904		Ernest Bickham Sweet-Escott, Governor	
1904 to 1912		Walter Edward Davidson, Governor	
1912 to 1918		Charles O'Brien, Governor	
1918 to 1922		Sir Eustace Twistleton-Wykeham-Fiennes, Governor	
1922 to 1927		Sir Joseph Byrne, Governor	
May 1927 to November 1927		Sir Malcolm Stevenson, Governor	
November 1927 to March 1928		Sir Justin Louis Devaux, Acting Governor	
March 1928		Robert Vere de Vere, Acting Governor	Sworn in on 22 March 1928 as Louis Devaux had refused to relinquish power
1928 to 1934		Sir de Symons Honey, Governor	
1934 to 1936		Sir Gordon Lethem, Governor	
1936 to 5 January 1942		Arthur Grimble, Governor	From 1 January 1938, Sir Arthur Francis Grimble
5 January 1942 to July 1947		William Marston Logan, Governor	From 8 June 1944, Sir William Marston Logan. John Woodman OBE (Chief Justice, 1943–47) acted as Governor in 1946.
July 1947 to 14 May 1951		Sir Percy Selwyn Selwyn-Clarke, Governor	
14 May 1951 to 1953		Frederick Crawford, Governor	
31 May 1953 to January 1958		William Addis, Governor	From 9 June 1955, Sir William Addis
January 1958 to 13 August 1961		John Thorp, Governor	From 13 June 1959, Sir John Kingsmill Thorp
January 1962 to 1967		Julian Asquith, 2nd Earl of Oxford and Asquith, Governor	
1967 to 1969		Sir Hugh Norman-Walker, Governor	
1969 to 1973		Sir Bruce Greatbatch, Governor	Autonomy granted to the Seychelles on 12 November 1970
1973 to 1 October 1975		Colin Allan, Governor	
1 October 1975 to 28 June 1976		Colin Allan, High Commissioner	Self-rule granted to the Seychelles on 1 October 1975
29 June 1976	Independence as Republic of Seychelles		

For continuation after independence, see: List of presidents of Seychelles

== See also ==
- History of Seychelles
- Politics of Seychelles
- List of presidents of Seychelles
- Vice-President of Seychelles
- Prime Minister of Seychelles
