= Wilfrid Edward Francis Jackson =

British colonial governor

Sir Wilfrid Edward Francis Jackson GCMG

Governor of Tanganyika
- In office 19 June 1941 – 28 April 1945
- Preceded by: Sir Mark Aitchison Young
- Succeeded by: Sir William Denis Battershill

Governor of British Guiana
- In office 19 November 1937 – 7 November 1941
- Monarch: George VI
- Preceded by: Sir Geoffry Alexander Stafford Northcote
- Succeeded by: Sir Gordon James Lethem

Governor of Mauritius
- In office 30 August 1930 – 7 June 1937
- Preceded by: Sir Herbert James Read
- Succeeded by: Sir Bede Edward Hugh Clifford

Personal details
- Born: 1883 St. John's, Newfoundland
- Died: 1971 (aged 87–88)
- Relations: Sir Edward St. John Jackson (brother)
- Parent: Sir Henry Moore Jackson (father)

Sir Wilfrid Edward Francis Jackson, GCMG (1883 – 28 March 1971) was a British colonial governor.

Jackson was born in St John's, Newfoundland, the son of Sir Henry Moore Jackson and his wife, Emily, Lady Jackson (née Shea). Edward St. John Jackson was his younger brother. The brothers were raised in their mother's Roman Catholic faith. He was educated at the Jesuit Stonyhurst College and at Lincoln College, Oxford.

He was the Governor of Mauritius from 30 August 1930 to 7 June 1937 and was knighted on 3 June 1931.

During this period the constitution was modified in 1933, and Dr Maurice Curé founded the worker's party as first political party in February 1936. Colonial secretary Edward Walter Evans (1890–1985) acted in place of him for these periods, when he was absent because of professional reasons.

Afterward, Jackson served as Governor of British Guiana from 1937 to 1941 and then he was Governor of Tanganyika from 1941 to 1945.

Government offices
Preceded by Sir Herbert James Read	Governor of Mauritius; 1930–1937	Succeeded by Sir Bede Edward Hugh Clifford
Preceded by Sir Geoffry Alexander Stafford Northcote	Governor of British Guiana; 1937–1941	Succeeded by Sir Gordon James Lethem
Preceded by Sir Mark Aitchison Young	Governor of Tanganyika; 1941–1945	Succeeded by Sir William Denis Battershill
