= Pacific Destiny =

1956 British film by Wolf Rilla

- British theatrical poster
- Directed by: Wolf Rilla
- Written by: Richard Mason (screenplay); Jack Lee (adaptation)
- Based on: book A Pattern of Islands by Sir Arthur Grimble
- Produced by: James Lawrie
- Starring: Denholm Elliott; Susan Stephen
- Cinematography: Martin Curtis
- Edited by: John Trumper
- Music by: James Bernard
- Production companies: Lawrie Productions Limited; British Lion Films Limited (in association with); Shepperton Studios, England
- Distributed by: A British Lion Release (UK)
- Release dates: 5 June 1956 (London, England)
- Running time: 96 mins
- Country: United Kingdom
- Language: English

Pacific Destiny is a 1956 British drama film directed by Wolf Rilla and starring Denholm Elliott, Susan Stephen and Michael Hordern. It was written by Richard Mason and Jack Lee based on the 1952 memoir A Pattern of Islands by Sir Arthur Grimble recounting his time in the Gilbert and Ellice Islands as a cadet officer and Resident Commissioner in the 1920s.

The screenplay concerns a young British couple who win the respect of the inhabitants of a South Pacific island during the colonial era.

Film credits show Samoa as the filming location.

== Plot ==
The true story of inexperienced District Officer Cadet Arthur Grimble who arrives with his bride Olivia on a remote Pacific island to work in the Colonial Service. He finds it hard to meet the approval of his superior, the Resident Commissioner, who had been expecting a more experienced man. The harder Grimble tries to please him, the more things seem to go awry, and he soon finds himself banished to a smaller neighbouring island. Olivia though is not as easily discouraged as her husband by the situation, and lends her support in a way that eventually meets with the approval of the island people.

== Cast ==
- Gilbert Harding as narrator
- Denholm Elliott as Arthur Grimble
- Susan Stephen as Olivia Grimble
- Michael Hordern as Resident Commissioner
- Felix Felton as uncle
- Peter Bathurst as uncle
- Clifford Buckton as uncle
- Gordon Jackson as District Officer
- Inia Te Wiata as Tauvela
- Henrietta Godinet as Lama
- Su'a Ezra Tavete Williams as Tiki-Tiku
- Hans Kruse as Kitiona
- Ollie Crichton as Taloa
- Rosie Leavasa as Sea Wind
- Moira Walker as Voice-of-the-Tide
- Sani as King's-Bundle-Of-Mats
- Fiti s Grandmother
- John Bryce as Tulo
- Tuiletufuga Taualai as Matangi
- Afamasaga Kalapu as Teraloa
- Ovalau Bureta as Fa'afetai
- Cecilia Fabricious as Movement-Of-Clouds
- Polo as Fa'alavelave
- Tusa as prisoner
- Noa as warder

Dances arranged by The Hon. Peseta Sio and Mailo

== Critical reception ==
The Monthly Film Bulletin wrote: "Pacific Destiny has the merit of getting away to an unfamiliar scene; and though it rarely manages to convey a vivid sense of life lived in a remote place, it strings together a series of enjoyably varied incidents, ranging from the comic to the melodramatic. The script, perhaps unavoidably episodic in view of its source, is inclined to simplify character and situation rather than to penetrate them. The shark episode is quite exciting, but in general the film lacks tension: Grimble's ultimate success is hardly in doubt. CinemaScope and Eastman Colour paint an attractive tropical background, though more, one feels, might have been made of the lively islanders, especially the children. Denholm Elliott and Susan Stephen give competent and likeable performances, but Michael Hordern as the Commissioner creates a more recognisably living character, Pacific Destiny, despite its limitations, is pleasingly unpretentious and warm-hearted."

Leonard Maltin called it a "Boring (but true) story."

TV Guide, though praising the performances of Elliott and Hordern, called it "a routine and boring story with a pretty picture backdrop."
