= Augustus Hemming =

British colonial administrator and cricketer

- Born: Augustus William Lawson Hemming; 2 September 1841; London, England
- Died: 28 March 1907 (aged 65); Cairo, Egypt
- Occupation: Colonial administrator

Sir Augustus William Lawson Hemming GCMG (2 September 1841 – 28 March 1907) was a British colonial administrator, who served as governor of a number of colonies, including British Guiana (1896–1898) and Jamaica (1898–1904).

== Biography ==
Augustus Hemming was born in London on 2 September 1841.

In April 1902, Sir Augustus Hemming (as governor of Jamaica) and Lady Hemming visited Cuba as guests of Military Governor Leonard Wood. Later the same year he opened an extension to the Constant Spring Hotel, promoting increased tourism to the island.

Hemming was also a first-class cricketer. He played six first-class matches: five for various teams in England between 1866 and 1878, and one in 1902 when he was Governor of Jamaica and aged 60.

He died in Cairo on 28 March 1907.

Government offices
Preceded by Sir Charles Cavendish Boyle	Governor of British Guiana; 1896–1898	Succeeded by Walter Joseph Sendall
Preceded by Sir Henry Arthur Blake	Governor of Jamaica; 1898–1904	Succeeded by Sir Alexander Swettenham
