= Bruce Greatbatch =

British Governor of the Seychelles from 1969 to 1973

Sir Bruce Greatbatch KCVO CMG MBE KStJ
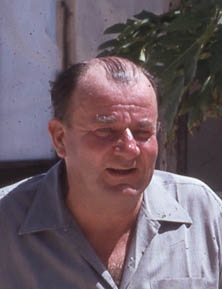
- Sir Bruce Greatbatch in 1970

Governor of the Seychelles
- In office 1969–1973
- Monarch: Elizabeth II
- Prime Minister: Sir James Mancham
- Preceded by: Sir Hugh Norman-Walker
- Succeeded by: Colin Allan

Personal details
- Born: 10 June 1917
- Died: 20 July 1989 (aged 72)
- Education: University of Oxford
- Civilian awards: Knight Commander of the Royal Victorian Order; Companion of the Order of St Michael and St George; Member of the Order of the British Empire

Military service
- Allegiance: United Kingdom
- Branch/service: Royal West African Frontier Force
- Years of service: 1940–1945
- Rank: Major
- Battles/wars: Second World War
- Military awards: Mentioned in Despatches

Sir Bruce Greatbatch, KCVO, CMG, MBE, KStJ (10 June 1917 – 20 July 1989) was a British Colonial Service officer and soldier who was the Governor of the Seychelles and Commissioner of the British Indian Ocean Territory from 1969 to 1973. He organized the forced deportation of the Chagossians from the Chagos Archipelago, which the International Court of Justice later ruled to be a violation of the Chagossians' right to self-determination.

== Early life ==
Greatbatch was born on 10 June 1917, the son of W. T. Greatbatch. He was educated at Malvern College and Brasenose College, Oxford. He served in administrative roles in Africa throughout the 1950s and 1960s before being appointed the Governor of the Seychelles in 1969.

In his role as Governor, Greatbatch oversaw the 1970 Seychellois parliamentary election, in which the James Mancham and the Seychelles Democratic Party won a majority. Greatbatch would later report that he had to stop Mancham from using the police to arrest the opposition.

== Role in the Chagos ==
When Greatbatch arrived in the Seychelles and the British Indian Ocean Territory, the United States and United Kingdom had already begun a process of depopulating Diego Garcia to build a joint military base there. In a 1966 series of diplomatic cables, two British diplomats had complained that "unfortunately" there were "some few Tarzans or Men Fridays whose origins are obscure" on the islands, and "The United States Government will require the removal of the entire population of the atoll".

Greatbatch oversaw this expulsion in his role as BIOT Commissioner. As part of the process, he ordered the islands' dog population to be killed, even before the last of the human residents were removed. Some of these dogs were strays left behind from families previously taken off the islands, but others were pets of families still present. Various methods of killing the dogs were attempted, including shooting and poisoning them, but most efficient method was to lure them into the old coconut furnaces and pipe in exhaust fumes from military vehicles to asphyxiate them. The islanders took this as a method of intimidation to encourage them to leave the islands.

In 1971, Greatbatch issued an Immigration Ordinance that banned anyone except British soldiers and officials from entering or staying on the Chagos Archipelago without a permit. By the end of 1973, all Chagossians had been exiled from the islands. Unlike the dogs, Greatbatch ordered that the horses on the islands be saved and moved to Mauritius or the Seychelles. The final boatload of Chagossian exiles had people filling the bottom of the boat, with horses filling the top deck.

Colin Allan took over Greatbatch's roles in the Seychelles and BIOT near the end of 1973.

== Honours ==
- Member of the Order of the British Empire (MBE, 1954 New Year Honours)
- Commander of the Royal Victorian Order (CVO, 1956)
- Companion of the Order of St Michael and St George (CMG, 1961 New Year Honours)
- Knight of the Order of Saint John
- Knight Bachelor (1969)
- Knight Commander of the Royal Victorian Order (KCVO, 1972)

Political offices
Preceded by Sir Hugh Norman-Walker	Governor of the Seychelles; 1969–1973	Succeeded by Colin Allan
Preceded by New position	Commissioner for the British Indian Ocean Territory; 1969–1973	Succeeded by Colin Allan
