= List of resident commissioners in Swaziland =

List of resident commissioners of Swaziland

This is a list of the resident commissioners of Swaziland, a kingdom in Southern Africa which gained full independence in 1968.

After the Second Boer War ended in 1902, a Swaziland order in council was made in Britain in 1903 and a Swaziland administration was proclaimed in 1904, which set up the machinery of government under a resident commissioner. However, Labotsibeni, Regent of Swaziland, protested strongly against the terms of both. In 1905, Prince Malunge led a Swazi deputation to Pretoria to meet the British high commissioner for Southern Africa, William Palmer, 2nd Earl of Selborne, and Selborne visited Swaziland in September 1906. He announced on his visit that the administration of Swaziland would, in view of the imminent restoration of self-government to the Transvaal, be transferred to himself. As a result of Labotsibeni's pressure, the threat posed by the recent Zulu uprising, and the unresolved issue of the land concessions, Swaziland thus became a high commission territory, under the high commissioner for Southern Africa, like Bechuanaland and Basutoland, although it was never declared to be a British protectorate, a status the Regent would not accept.

== Resident commissioners ==
Date	Name	Birth/Death
1902–1907	Francis Enraght-Moony	b. 1865 – d. 1943
1907–1916	Robert Thorne Coryndon	b. 1870 – d. 1925
Jan 1917 – Oct 1928	Sir De Symons Montagu George Honey	b. 1872 – d. 1945
Oct 1928 – 1 Apr 1935	Thomas Ainsworth Dickson	b. 1881 – d. 1935
Oct 1935 – Nov 1937	Allan Graham Marwick	b. 1877 – d. 1966
Nov 1937 – 30 Sep 1942	Charles Lamb Bruton	b. 1890 – d. 1969
30 Sep 1942 – 25 Aug 1946	Eric Kellett Featherstone	b. 1896 – d. 1965
25 Aug 1946 – 1951	Edward Betham Beetham	b. 1905 – d. 1979
1951–1956	David Loftus Morgan	b. 1904 – d. 1976
1956–1964	Brian Allan Marwick	b. 1908 – d. 1992
1964–1968	Francis Alfred Lloyd	b. 1916 – d. 2006

== See also ==
- High Commissioner for Southern Africa
