= Henry Hesketh Bell =

British colonial administrator and author (1864–1952)

Sir Henry Hesketh Joudou Bell GCMG FRGS
- Sir Henry Hesketh Joudou Bell by Elliott & Fry, 1922 © National Portrait Gallery, London
- Born: Henry Hesketh Joudou; 17 December 1864; Chambéry, France
- Died: 1 August 1952 (aged 87); Nursing home, London
- Education: Privately in Channel Islands, Paris and Brussels
- Occupation: British colonial administrator
- Years active: 1882-1924
- Known for: Building railways in Uganda
- Awards: GCMG 1925

Sir Henry Hesketh Joudou Bell GCMG, FRGS (17 December 1864 – 1 August 1952) was a British colonial administrator and author.

== Biography ==
Bell was born on 17 December 1864 at Chambéry in the Savoie department of south-east France. He was the son of Henry Jean Antoine Joudou, a timber merchant, and Scotswoman Martha Bell. He had one sibling: Eléonore Marthe Joudou-Bell (1867-1951). Hesketh Bell's ancestry has been extensively researched.

Bell was privately educated in the Channel Islands, and in Paris and Brussels. In May 1882 he started work in Barbados, as third clerk in the office of the Governor of Barbados and the Leeward Islands, a post he was offered by family friend Sir William C. F. Robinson. From then on he rose through the system in the following posts:

- 1885-1889 – Grenada Inland Revenue Department
- 1890-94 – Supervisor of Customs in the Gold Coast
- Receiver General and Treasurer of the Bahamas
- 1899-1905 – Administrator Of Dominica
- 1905-08 – Commissioner (later, Governor) of the Uganda Protectorate
- 1909-11 – Governor of Northern Nigeria
- 1912-16 – Governor of the Leeward Islands
- 1916-24 – Governor of Mauritius

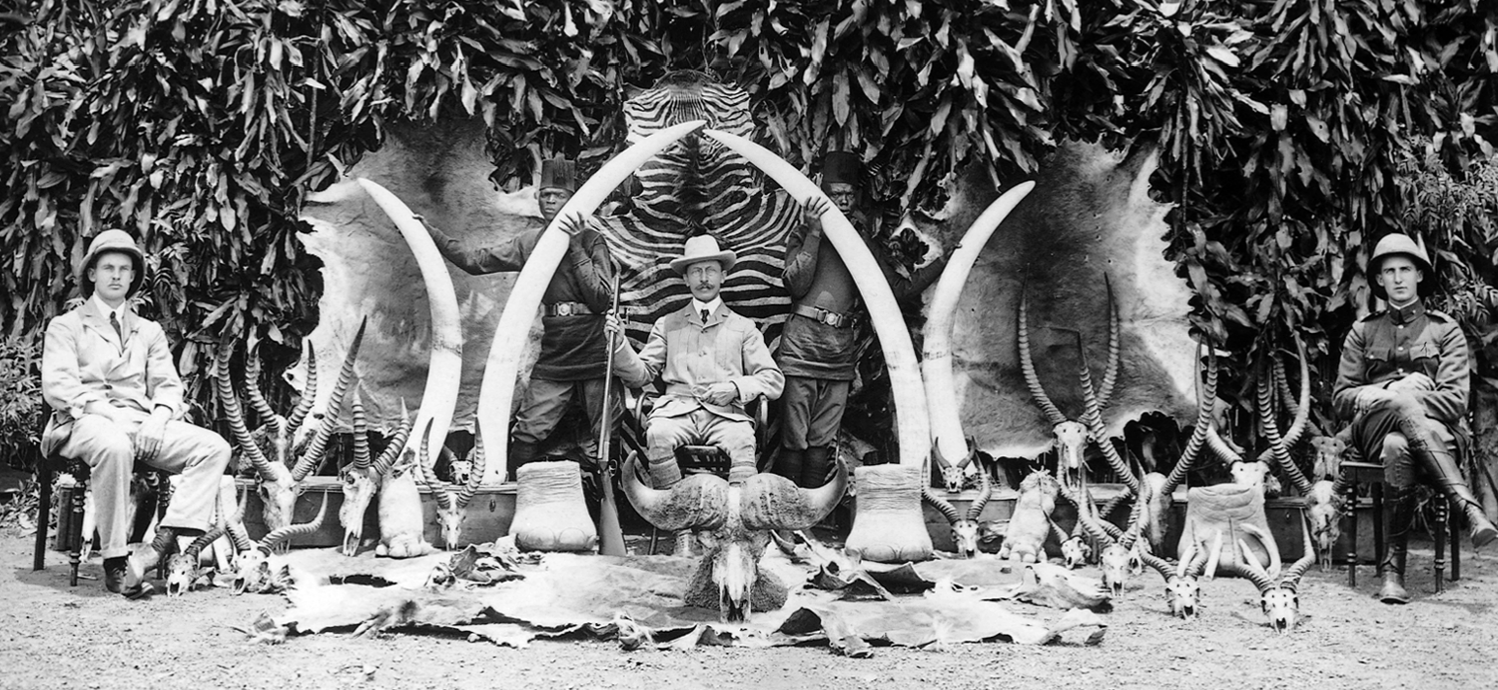
Bell with hunting trophies in Uganda, 1908

In December 2007, New Vision, a Ugandan online newspaper, posted a piece entitled "Hesketh Bell's Ugandan descendants" in which 72-year old Ketty Karuyonga Bell, said to be a great-granddaughter of the former Governor, tells her story.

Hesketh Bell, who never married, is alleged to have had a son with a Mutooro woman, Maria Nyamuhaibona. The boy, John Dick Bell, is said to have been born on 18 December 1905. Hesketh Bell reportedly sent support for the boy, until he learned that John had had a serious accident when he was 10; support then stopped. John, who had 12 children, died of a heart attack in 1953.

Bell's many achievements in Uganda have been summarised as a teaching aid.

One of the most important was a scheme for suppressing sleeping sickness, which Bell proposed in August 1907. After the Treasury authorized the funds for the work, the natives were moved from the fly-infested district on the shores of Lake Victoria to healthy locations inland. The sick were placed in segregation camps to undergo the so-called atoxyl treatment; an estimated 20,000 people were dealt with. The shores of Lake Victoria were cleared of all vegetation, thus removing the presence of the tsetse fly.

Hesketh Bell's vision for Uganda included major development of its railway. By 1909 he had battled hard for approval of two schemes: first, a line from Jinja, on the north shore of Lake Victoria to Kakindu and then to Lake Kioga; and, second, a direct line from Kampala to Lake Albert.

Bell retired to Cannes in 1924, but he still travelled widely. In 1925-26 he made an extensive semi-official tour of the Far East to study French and Dutch systems of colonial government. His conclusions were published as Foreign colonial administration in the Far East in 1928, for which he was awarded the Gold Medal of the Royal Empire Society.

During the Second World War, Bell returned to live in the Bahamas, but was a frequent visitor to London, where he was a member of the Conservative Club in St James's.In 1951, Bell’s will was signed and witnessed in Monaco, where he also had a home. In it he:

- directed that his bust, by James Alexander Stevenson, be offered to the Government of Mauritius "in the hope that it may be placed in some suitable place in ‘Bell Village’" which he founded in 1915.
- bequeathed his portrait by de Laszlo to the Government of Mauritius.
- directed that his diaries and accompanying scrap-books be offered to the Trustees of the British Museum.
- bequeathed the sum of £50 to each of four godsons:
  - Peter Myers of 'Greenways', Wadlands Brook Road near East Grinstead. He was Peter S F Myers, born in 1926, son of Harold Hawthorn Myers and Muriel Letitia Swinfen Eady (daughter of Charles Swinfen Eady, 1st Baron Swinfen).
  - James Lightfoot of Belgrave Lodge, Belgrave Square, Monkstown, County Dublin, of whom nothing is known.
  - Henry Morcom of 6 Chester Street, London SW1. He was Henry Richard Morcom (1922-2008), son of Alfred Morcom and Sylvia Millicent Birchenough (daughter of Sir John Henry Birchenough, 1st Baronet).
  - Robert Hesketh Dolbey, of 37 Grosvenor Square, London W1. He was Robert Hesketh Gay Dolbey (1928-2011), son of Robert Valentine Dolbey of Sutton and Virginia Gay of Battle Mountain, Nevada.
- left £300 and his typewriter, radio, clothes and other items to The Marchesa Stella Vitelleschi of Villa Moderno, Monaco.
- left £1,000 and the balance of his estate to his niece, Mrs Marjorie Leonora Apperson.

== Death ==
Sir Henry Hesketh Joudou Bell, GCMG, who lived at 92 Redcliffe Gardens, Kensington, died at a nursing home on 1 August 1952.

== Family ==
Bell's sister, Eléonore Marthe Joudou-Bell, married John Francis Scully. They had one child, registered as Marjory Léonore Scully at birth (1893), but Marjorie Leonore in the National Probate Calendar. She married twice: first, to Thomas Arthur Apperson in 1920 and, second, to Alfred Robert Llewellin-Taylour, MA, FRSA, FRGS, a barrister in 1954. When Hesketh Bell died in 1952, "Marjorie Leonora Apperson single woman" was named in his will. When she, in turn, died in 1968, her executors deposited Hesketh Bell's collection of photographs with the Royal Commonwealth Society.

== Awards and honours ==
- Henry Bell was elected a Fellow of the Royal Geographical Society in 1891.
- He was created a Companion of the Order of St. Michael and St. George (CMG) in 1903. He was advanced to Knight Commander (KCMG) in 1908 and to Grand Knight Commander (GCMG) in the 1925 New Year Honours.

== Publications ==
His works included memoirs, fiction, and colonial history and administration

- 1889 – Obeah: witchcraft in the West Indies
- 1893 – A Witch's Legacy
- 1893 – The History, Trade, Resources, and present Condition of the Gold Coast Settlement
- 1894 – Outlines of the Geography of the Gold Coast Colony and Protectorate. Compiled for use in the colonial schools
- 1909 – Report on the Measures Adopted for the Suppression of Sleeping Sickness in Uganda
- 1911 – Love in Black [Sketches of native life in West Africa]
- 1911 – Recent Progress in Northern Nigeria
- 1928 – Foreign colonial administration in the Far East
- 1946 – Glimpses of a Governor's Life, from diaries, letters and memoranda
- 1948 – Witches & Fishes

Government offices
Preceded by Sir James Hayes Sadler	Governor of Uganda; 1905–1908	Succeeded by Sir Herbert James Read
Preceded by Sir Percy Girouard	Governor of Northern Nigeria; 1909–1911	Succeeded by Sir Charles Lindsay
Preceded by Sir Ernest Bickham Sweet-Escott	Governor of the Leeward Islands; 1912–1916	Succeeded by Sir Edward Marsh Merewether
Preceded by Sir John Robert Chancellor	Governor of Mauritius; 1916–1924	Succeeded by Sir Herbert James Read
