= Walter Andrew Bowring =

British colonial administrator (1875–1950)

Walter Andrew Bowring, CBE (30 November 1875 – 3 November 1950) was a British colonial administrator. He was Administrator of Dominica from 1931 to 1933.

== Life and career ==
The fifth son of J. C. Bowring, Walter Andrew Bowring was educated at Eton College. He entered the Colonial Audit Branch of the Exchequer and Audit Department in 1894, before becoming Assistant Auditor of the East Africa Protectorate and Uganda Railway in 1899, and Local Auditor of the Uganda Protectorate in 1902. He was appointed Treasurer of Cyprus in 1909, and remained there for 15 years, during which he reorganized the financial machinery of the island. A member of the Executive and Legislative Councils of Cyprus, during the First World War he was Chief Refugee Commissioner of Cyprus from 1915. From 1921 to 1922 he was on special duty in Aden and Somaliland.

In 1924, he was transferred to Gibraltar as Treasurer, serving until 1931. A member of the Executive Council of Gibraltar from 1924, he was chairman of the Gibraltar City Council from 1924 to 1927. He was appointed Administrator of Dominica in 1931, and retired in 1933. He died in London in 1950.

Bowring was appointed CBE in 1928.

== Family ==
Bowring married in 1919 Nita Maud, daughter of Major J. E. W. Howey; they had a son and a daughter.
