= Coat of arms of Kiribati =

National emblem of Kiribati

National Emblem of Kiribati

Versions
- The banner of arms, which serves as national flag
- Armiger: Republic of Kiribati
- Shield: Gules, issuant from a base barry wavy Argent and Azure, a Sun in Splendour Or, in chief a Frigatebird volant Or.
- Motto: Te Mauri te Raoi ao te Tabomoa (lit. 'Health, Peace and Prosperity')

The coat of arms of Kiribati, officially known as the National Emblem of Kiribati, is the heraldic symbol representing the Central Pacific island nation of Kiribati. The arms feature a golden-coloured lesser frigatebird (Note: Frigatebirds are almost entirely black in colour; the golden colour is presumably derived from the glowing sun at sunrise.) over a rising sun on a red background among white and blue stripes (symbol of the Pacific) and the 3 pairs of stripes represent the three archipelagos of the nation (Gilbert, Phoenix and Line Islands). The 17 rays of the sun represent the 16 Gilbert Islands and Banaba (former Ocean Island). On the ribbon under the shield is the Gilbertese motto Te Mauri te Raoi ao te Tabomoa (Health, Peace, and Prosperity).

The original and official version of both the National Flag and Emblem of Kiribati could be obtained from the Office of Te Beretitenti, the Ministry of Justice, or other Government's Ministries and Departments. The original design and specifications of both the flag and emblem are stipulated in the Constitution of Republic of Kiribati.

== History ==
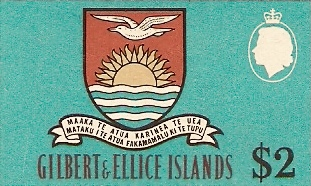
1968 Gilbert & Ellice stamp, after A$ first introduction, representing the coat of arms of the colony (1937–1976). The bird is displayed incorrectly, being white in colour instead of yellow/gold, and lacking the frigatebird's distinctive beak.

After being drawn by Sir Arthur Grimble in 1932, the coat of arms was granted by the College of Arms on 1 May 1937 to the Gilbert and Ellice Islands, then British Colony, which paid £25 for it, and was adapted as the official coat of arms of Kiribati in 1979 with the new motto. The design was partially inspired by the flag of the Company of Scotland. The previous motto of the British Colony (1937–1979) was "Fear God, Honour the King" (both in Gilbertese, Maaka te Atua, Karinea te Uea; or Tuvaluan, Mataku i te Atua, Fakamamalu ki te Tupu).

The same motif is seen on the flag of Kiribati.

== Sources ==
- Minahan, James, 2010: The Complete Guide to National Symbols and Emblems (2 vols); Kiribati: p 79 (text;Googlebooks) and p 282 (image; Googlebooks) ABC-CLIO LLC. ISBN 978-0-313-34496-1
- Heraldry of the World: Kiribati
- http://www.paclii.org/ki/legis/num_act/nia1989197.pdf
