= De Symons Honey =

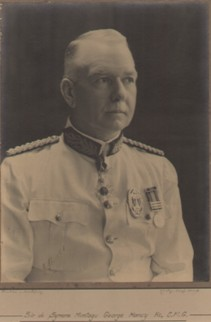
De Symons Honey

Sir de Symons Montagu George Honey, CMG (1 November 1872 – January 1945) was a Cape Colony-born colonial administrator. He served as Resident Commissioner in Swaziland, from 1917 to 1928 and as Governor of the Seychelles from 1928 to 1933.

== Life and career ==
Honey was born in Alexandria, Cape Province, the son of J. W. Honey, retired Civil Commissioner and Resident Magistrate, Cape Service. He was educated at Carnarvon Public School. He then joined the British South Africa Police and took part in the Pioneer Column which occupied Mashonaland. He served in the British Central Africa Administration and took part in the Second Boer War.

In 1901 he joined the Transvaal Civil Service under Lord Milner. He specialised in Swaziland affairs, and in 1904 was appointed Secretary to the Governor of the Transvaal for Swaziland affairs. In 1907 he became Government Secretary of Swaziland, and in 1910 he was made Deputy Resident Commissioner of Swaziland. From 1917 to 1928 he served as Resident Commissioner in Swaziland.

In 1928 he was appointed Governor and Commander-in-Chief of the Seychelles, retiring in 1933. As Governor, Honey obtained loans for the development of infrastructure, mainly roads, on Mahé, Praslin and La Digue. He also inaugurated the World War Memorial in the Mont Fleuri Cemetery. He died in Cape Town in 1945.

Honey was appointed a CMG in 1919 and a knight bachelor in 1932.

== Family ==
Honey married Violet Marguerite, daughter of Charles Jones of Stellenbosch, in 1904; they had two sons.

Government offices
Preceded by Robert Vere de Vere	Governor of the Seychelles; 1928–1934	Succeeded by Gordon James Lethem
