= Charles Bruce (governor) =

18th Governor of Mauritius

Sir George Charles Bruce GCMG JP
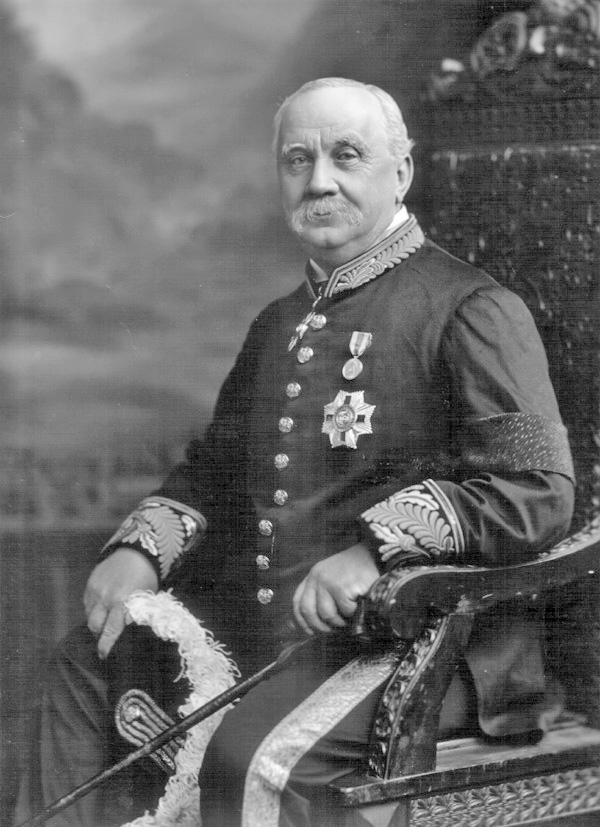

Personal details
- Born: 1836 British India
- Died: 13 December 1920 (aged 83–84) Edinburgh

Sir Charles Bruce GCMG JP (1836 – 13 December 1920) was a British colonial administrator and author. He was the 18th Governor of Mauritius, from 1897 to 1903.

== Early life ==
Charles Bruce was born in British India in 1836, the son of Thomas Bruce, of Arnott, Kinross-shire, who worked for many years for the Honourable East India Company. His father was a descendant of the 9th Earl of Home. Young Charles was educated at Harrow and Yale University. In early life he went to Germany, and devoted himself to the study of Oriental language and literature, mainly Sanskrit and Zend-Pahlavi. He assisted in preliminary work for the Great Sandskrit Dictionary by Otto von Böhtlingk and Rudolf von Roth (Sanskrit Wörterbuch, 7 vols., 1855–75), published by the Imperial Academy of St. Petersburg. It was through this connection he was able to get the academy to publish his work Die Geschichte von Nala (1862), an attempt to restore the original text of an episode in the Indian epic, the Mahabharata. While serving as a librarian at the British Museum, he was in 1865 elected Professor of Sanskrit at King's College, Cambridge.

== Colonial administrator ==
Bruce left for Mauritius in 1868, to take up position as Rector of the Royal College in Port Louis. He held this post for 10 years, until he transferred to Ceylon in 1878 to become Director of Public Instruction. He was appointed a Companion of the Order of St Michael and St George (CMG) in the 1881 Birthday Honours for his service during his years in Ceylon. By 1882 he was back in Mauritius as Colonial Secretary, but left for British Guiana in 1885 to become Lieutenant-Governor. He continued as such until 1893, during which he was three times Acting Governor, and in 1889 was knighted as a Knight Commander of the Order of St Michael and St George (KCMG).

In 1893, Bruce was appointed Governor of the Windward Islands. The colony of the Windward Islands consisted at this time of Grenada, Saint Vincent and the Grenadines, and St. Lucia, the Governor had his seat in Grenada.

Bruce was appointed Governor of Mauritius in May 1897. The six years of his tenure as governor, until 1903, were marked by substantial progress. With the support of the Colonial Secretary, Joseph Chamberlain, he reformed every public department and took measures to prepare the island to meet frequent devastating hurricanes. He was promoted to Knight Grand Cross of the Order of St Michael and St George (GCMG) in August 1901, on the occasion of the visit of the Duke and Duchess of Cornwall and York (later King George V and Queen Mary)

His work The Broad Stone of Empire (1910) described his experience of the problems with Crown colony administration.

== Later life ==
On his return to the United Kingdom, Bruce became a campaigner for Indian immigrants and settlers in other British colonies, especially in South Africa. He was an early member of the committee formed in London to uphold their claims, and in June 1908 he headed a representative deputation to ask Lord Crewe for the intervention of the Home Government.

He was also a Justice of the Peace and a Deputy Lieutenant for Kinross-shire

== Family ==
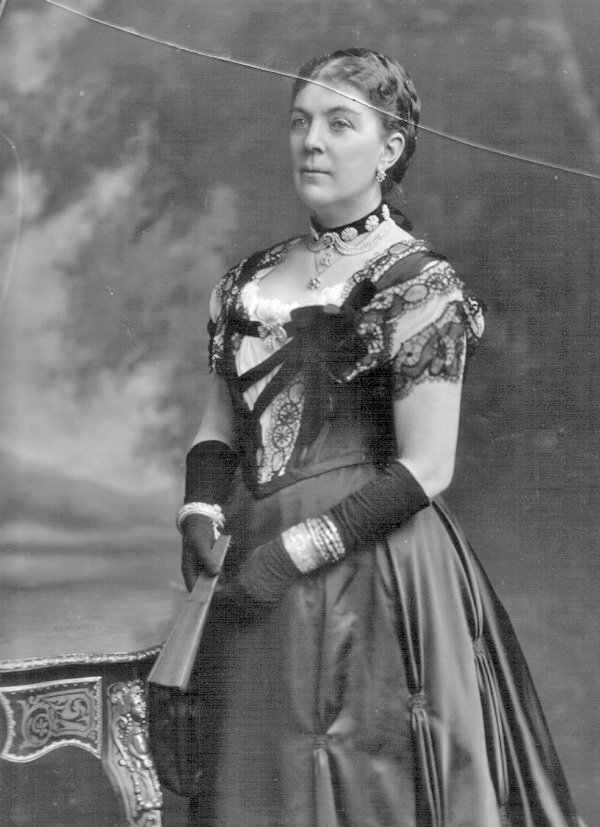
Lady Bruce, née Clara Lucas (d. 1916). Photographed 28 March 1901

Bruce married, in 1868, Clara Lucas, daughter of John Lucas, and had two sons. Charles Maurice Dundas Bruce was born in Mauritius in 1869 and killed in action in the First Somaliland Campaign in 1903.

Lady Bruce died in April 1916. He himself died in Edinburgh 13 December 1920.

== Publications ==
- Die Geschichte von Nala (1862)
- Poems (1865)
- The Broad Stone of Empire (1910)
- The True Temper of Empire (1912)
- Milestones on my Long Journey (1917)

Government offices
Preceded by Sir Walter Hely-Hutchinson	Governor of the Windward Islands; 1893–97	Succeeded by Sir Cornelius Alfred Moloney
Preceded by Sir Hubert Edward Henry Jerningham	Governor of Mauritius; 11 May 1897 – 30 October 1903	Succeeded by Sir Charles Cavendish Boyle
