= John Shaw (colonial administrator) =

British colonial administrator

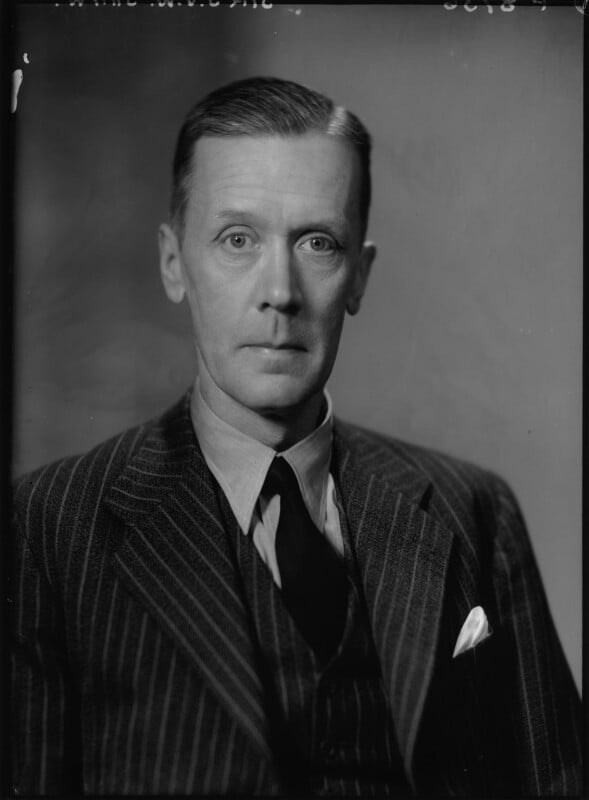
Shaw in 1946

Sir John Valentine Wistar Shaw KCMG (14 February 1894 – 24 December 1982) was a British colonial administrator.

Born in Derby on 14 February 1894, Shaw was educated at Repton School, and in the First World War did military service from 1914 to 1919. He then joined the Colonial Administrative Service.

== Appointments ==
Gold Coast

- Assistant District Commissioner, 1921–1925
- District Commissioner, 1925–1928
- Assistant Secretary, 1928–1935

Palestine

- Assistant Secretary, 1935–1938
- Senior Assistant Secretary, 1938–1939
- Departmental Chief Secretary, 1939–1940

Cyprus

- Colonial Secretary 1940–1943

Palestine

- Chief Secretary 1943

Palestine and Cyprus

- Acting Governor, Cyprus and Acting High Commissioner for Palestine for several periods, 1940–1946.

Trinidad and Tobago

- Governor and Commander-in-Chief, 1947–1950

== Death ==
Shaw died on 24 December 1982 in Hastings, Sussex.

== Honours and legacy ==
Shaw was awarded the CMG in 1942, became Knight Bachelor in 1946, and KCMG in 1947. His papers are held by the Bodleian Library of Commonwealth and African Studies at Rhodes House, with additional items at the Brotherton Library, University of Leeds.
