= List of governors of the Windward Islands =

This is a list of viceroys in the British Windward Islands. The colony of the Windward Islands was created in 1833 and consisted of Grenada, Barbados (to 1885), Saint Vincent and the Grenadines, Tobago (to 1889), St. Lucia (from 1838), and Dominica (from 1940). The Governor of Barbados was also the Governor of the Windward Islands, until Barbados became an independent colony in 1885. After this, a Governor of the Windward Islands was appointed with a seat in Grenada.

== Governors-in-chief of the Windward Islands (1885–1960) ==
Image	Incumbent	Term	Notes
	Sir Walter Joseph Sendall	1885–1888	
	Sir Walter Hely-Hutchinson	1889–1892	
	Sir Charles Bruce	1893–1897	
	Sir Cornelius Alfred Moloney	1897–1900	
	Sir Robert Baxter Llewelyn	1900–1906	
	Sir Ralph Champneys Williams	1906–1909	
	Sir James Hayes Sadler	1909–1914	
	Sir George Basil Haddon-Smith	1914–1923	
	Sir Frederick Seton James	1924–1930	
	Sir Thomas Alexander Vans Best	1930–1935	
	Sir Selwyn MacGregor Grier	1935–19 January 1937	
	Sir Henry Bradshaw Popham	19 January 1937 – 18 May 1942	
	Sir Arthur Grimble	18 May 1942 – 1948	
	Brigadier Sir Robert Arundell	1948–1953	
	Edward Beetham	1953–1955	
	Sir Colville Deverell	1955–1 January 1960	
