= Edward Carlyon Eliot =

British colonial administrator

Resident Commissioner of the Gilbert and Ellice Islands
- In office October 1913 – April 1919
- Preceded by: John Quayle-Dickson
- Succeeded by: Herbert Reginald McClure

Personal details
- Born: 1870
- Died: 1940 (aged 69–70)
- Occupation: Colonial Service

Edward Carlyon Eliot, CBE (18 April 1870 – 1 January 1940) was a British Colonial Service administrator.

== Personal ==
Eliot was the son of Edward Eliot and Elizabeth Harriette (née Watling), and described as a neat, slim man of medium height with very black hair. His brother was Charles Eliot, who was Commissioner for British East Africa and Ambassador to Japan.

Edward married, first, Clara Frances Paterson on 6 June 1899; and, second, Alice Marion Shand, granddaughter of Henry Alfred Alford Nicholls, in 1927, with whom he had a son, David, in 1935.

== Career ==
- 1888-1892 Cattle ranching in Argentina
- 1893-1895 Sugar planting in Demerara
- 1895 Entered the Colonial Service. Among the posts he held were:

1907-10 Provincial Commissioner, West Africa
1911-13 Commissioner and Warden of Tobago
1913-1919 Resident Commissioner, Gilbert and Ellice Islands Colony
1916-17 Private secretary (temporary) to the Governor-General
of Australia
1921-22 Acting Chief Secretary and Deputy Governor of Uganda
1922 Acting Governor of Uganda
1923-31 Administrator of Dominica

During his time in the Gilbert and Ellice Islands he worked to improve conditions involved in the mining of phosphates.

Eliot […] was struggling at the time of our arrival to improve the conditions that governed the mining of phosphate on Ocean Island. His aims were to secure for the Banaban villagers an increase of the tonnage-royalties paid into a trust fund for their phosphate, and to set up guards against the premature encroachment of the diggings upon their villages. He won his fight eventually in the teeth of much official misunderstanding. Fifteen years later, as Resident Commissioner myself, I was called to add a little to the foundations he had laid, and others added more after me. But it was mainly due to his courage and foresight between 1913 and 1920 that the Banabans of 1945 found themselves in a position to buy an exquisite new home for themselves in the Fiji group and to migrate there in their own good time.

Eliot was appointed CBE in the 1931 New Year Honours List

== Selected works ==
Eliot's published writings encompass two works in three publications in one language and 56 library holdings.

- Gilbert and Ellice Islands Protectorate. Report for 1912-1914: Presented to both Houses of Parliament by command of His Majesty. June, 1915.
- Address to Legislative Council of Dominica (1928)
- Broken Atoms (1938)
- Ocean Island Affairs: Gilbert and Ellice Islands Protectorate (later Colony), 1913-20. (1938)

Journals

- "A Model Protectorate: Gilbert & Ellice Islands, Central Pacific". United Empire: The Royal Colonial Institute Journal. 6 (12): 878–882. December 1915.
- "In an Open Boat on the Pacific". United Empire: 393–395. September 1918.
