= William Marston Logan =

British colonial administrator

William Martson Logan
- Born: 10 March 1889
- Died: 30 September 1968 (aged 79)
- Occupation: Politician

Sir William Marston Logan, KBE, CMG (10 March 1889 – 30 September 1968) was a British colonial administrator. He was Governor of Seychelles from 1942 to 1947.

The son of the Rev. James Moffat Logan, Logan was educated in Bristol and at Brasenose College, Oxford. After joining the Colonial Administrative Service as a District Officer in Kenya in 1913.
