= Graham John Bower =

British diplomat (1848–1933)

Sir Graham John Bower KCMG (1848–1933), was an Irish colonial official of the British Empire.

Bower was born in Ireland. After service in the Royal Navy, he was made Imperial secretary to the High Commissioner for Southern Africa, Sir Hercules Robinson. In 1896, he accepted blame for not notifying his superiors in advance of the Jameson Raid. Although he had, in fact notified them, this acceptance provided political protection for Joseph Chamberlain, then Secretary of State for the Colonies. In September 1898, he was appointed Colonial Secretary of the Colony of Mauritius.
