= Henry Bradshaw Popham =

Soldier in the South African War and Governor of the Windward Islands 1937-1942

Sir Henry Bradshaw Popham KCMG MBE

Governor of the Windward Islands
- In office 19 January 1937 – 18 May 1942

Personal details
- Born: 23 August 1881 Walmer, Kent, England
- Died: 15 April 1947
- Parents: Thomas Dalton Popham (1849–1885) (father); Annie Emma West (1857–1945) (mother)
- Awards: Order of St Michael and St George

Sir Henry Bradshaw Popham KCMG MBE (23 August 1881 – 15 April 1947) was a soldier in the South African War and Governor of the Windward Islands 1937–1942.

== Early life and education ==
Popham was born 23 August 1881 at Walmer, Kent, the son of a surgeon at the Royal Navy hospital at Port Royal in Trinidad, Thomas Dalton Popham (1849–1885) and Annie Emma West (1857–1945). his brother was Charles Home Popham (1884–1955).

He was educated at Tonbridge School in Kent. He later married Millicent Collyer on 27 March 1913 at Seaton in Devon.

== Career ==
Popham's first commission was in Prince Albert's 13th Battalion Somerset Light Infantry in 1900. He then served in South African War (receiving 2 medals). He was seconded to the Gold Coast Regiment as Lieutenant (replacing O. C. Mordaunt) on 1 May 1905., whilst there he entered the Colonial Service where he became private secretary and Aide-de-camp to the Acting-Governor from March to August 1909, then at the Colonial-Secretary’s office from January 1910, private secretary to Acting-Governor from February to June 1911, and Acting Chief Assistant Colonial-Secretary and elk. of councils between July and August 1913. Served as District Commissioner in 1914 followed by a secondment to the British Sphere of Occupation in Togoland as District Political Administration from 1914 to 1920 (for which he was granted an M.B.E.)

He then returned to the Gold Coast as Senior Assistant to the Colonial Secretary in 1920; as Deputy Provincial Commissioner in 1921 and Provincial Commissioner in 1922 from which he retired on an annual salary of £1200, on medical grounds, in 1923. Then in 1925 he continued as Commissioner of Cyprus and Administrator to Dominica in 1933.

This followed, on Sir Selwyn Grier retirement, with his appointment on 19 January 1937 to Governor and Commander-in-Chief of the Windward Islands residing at St. George's, Grenada where his salary rose to £2,500 (with £500 duty allowance and another £500 travelling allowance). It was during this role he visited, with his wife, the 1939 New York World's Fair in August.

Popham died 15 April 1947 and his will was probated on 31 October 1947 in London, England.

== Honours and awards ==
Among some of his achievements, Popham was appointed a Member of the Order of the British Empire (M.B.E.) in 1918, made a CMG in June 1935 and then later knighted Commander KCMG in 1938.

Diplomatic posts
Government offices
Preceded by Sir Arthur Grimble	Governor of the Windward Islands; 1936–1942	Succeeded by Sir Selwyn Grier
Preceded by Sir Arthur Grimble	Governor of the Windward Islands; 19 Jan 1937–1948	Succeeded by Sir Selwyn Grier
