= 1967 Seychellois parliamentary election =

← 1963	1967	1970 →

All 8 seats in the Legislative Council 5 seats needed for a majority
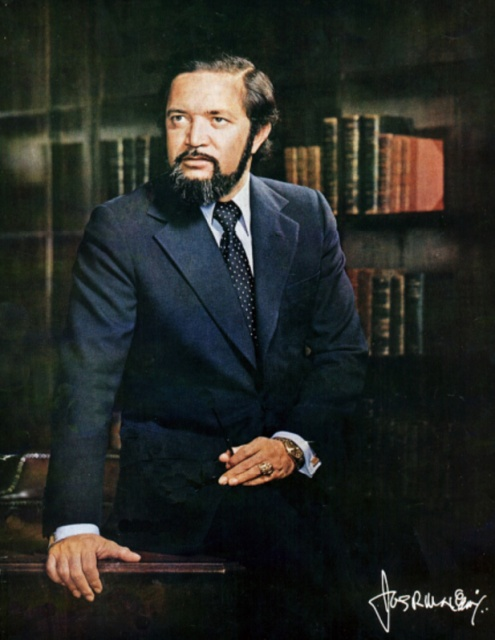

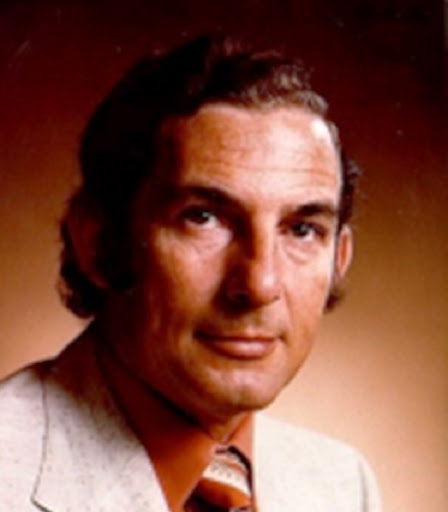
	First party	Second party
Leader	James Mancham	France-Albert René
Party	Democratic	People's United
Seats won	4	3
Popular vote	8,760	8,621
Percentage	48.94%	48.16%
- Winning party by district

Parliamentary elections were held in the Seychelles in 1967. The Seychelles Democratic Party won four of the eight seats.

== Results ==
Party	Votes	%	Seats
Seychelles Democratic Party	8,760	48.94	4
Seychelles People's United Party	8,621	48.16	3
Independents	519	2.90	1
Total	17,900	100.00	8
Source: Sternberger et al.
