= Languages of Seychelles =

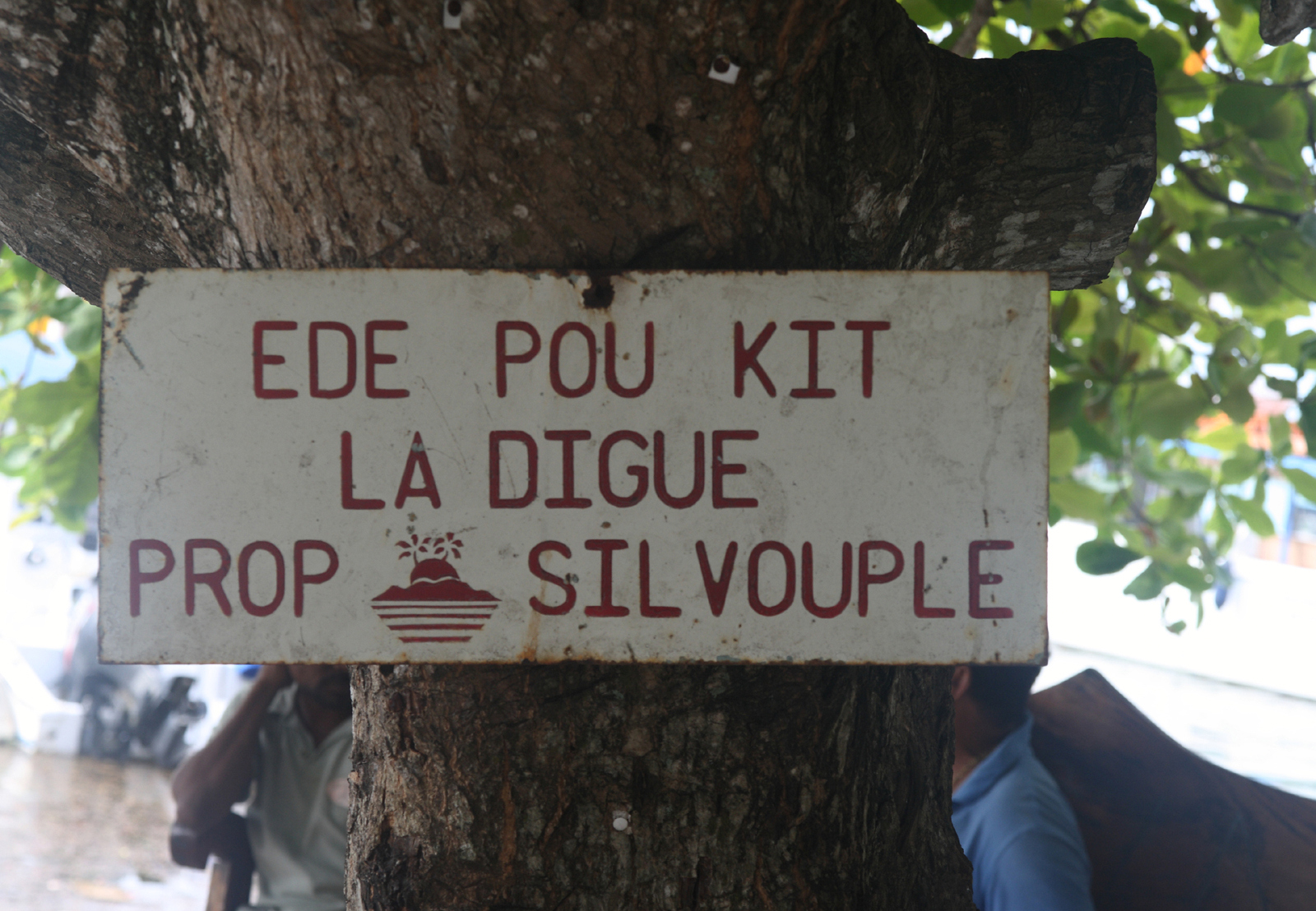
- Sign in Seychellois Creole, La Digue
- Official: English, French, Seychellois Creole
- Signed: Seychelles Sign Language
- Keyboard layout: QWERTY

The national languages of Seychelles are Seychellois Creole, English and French. Seychellois Creole, a French-based creole language, is by far the most commonly spoken language in the archipelago and is spoken natively by about 95% of the population. Nevertheless, the country was a British colony for over a century and a half, and the legacy of British Seychelles made English remain the main language in government and business. French was introduced before British rule. It has remained in use largely because it is used by the Franco-Seychellois minority and is similar to Seychellois Creole.

== See also ==
- Demographics of Seychelles
- Languages of Mauritius
- African French
