= Disability in Seychelles =

As of 1996, there were 1,496 people with varying degree of disability in Seychelles.

== History ==
Seychelles signed the Convention on the Rights of Persons with Disabilities on 30 March 2007 and ratified it on 2 October 2009. It went into effect on 1 November 2009.

== Statistics ==
In 1981, there were 2,908 people with disability after the country made a survey to identify the number of people with such characters. And in 1991, there were 732 people.

== Classification ==
Disability in Seychelles is classified into several categories, which are physical, mental or intellectual impairments and sensory impairments category, which include hearing, speech and vision.

== Advocacy ==
The Association for People with Hearing Impairment (APHI) was founded in 2005 to train teachers of the deaf and to promote public awareness of Seychelles Sign Language.
