= 1974 Seychellois parliamentary election =

- 25 April 1974

All 15 seats in the Legislative Assembly 8 seats needed for a majority
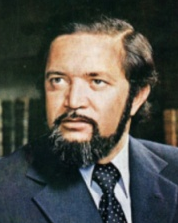

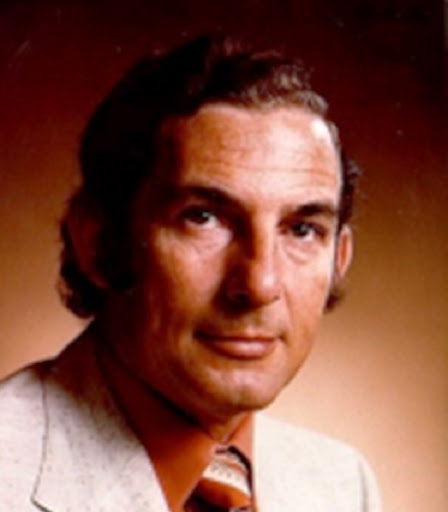
	First party	Second party
Leader	James Mancham	France-Albert René
Party	Democratic	FPPS
Last election	52.82%, 10 seats	44.08%, 5 seats
Seats won	13	2
Seat change	▲3	▼3
Popular vote	21,902	19,920
Percentage	52.37%	47.63%
Swing	▼0.45pp	▲3.55pp
- Results by constituency
Chief Minister before election
James Mancham
Democratic
Elected Chief Minister
James Mancham
Democratic

Parliamentary elections were held in the Seychelles on 25 April 1974. The result was a victory for the Seychelles Democratic Party, which won 13 of the 15 seats.

== Results ==
Party	Votes	%	Seats	+/–
Seychelles Democratic Party	21,902	52.37	13	+3
Seychelles People's United Party	19,920	47.63	2	−3
Total	41,822	100.00	15	0
Source: African Elections Database
