= History of Seychelles =

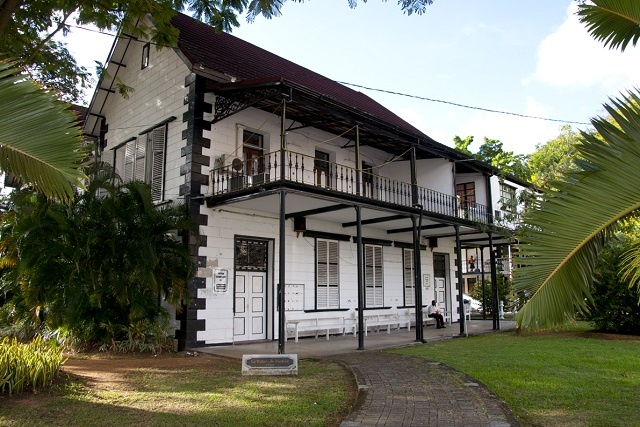
The Seychelles History Museum in Victoria, Seychelles, the former Supreme Court building.

The history of Seychelles dates back to the fourth of the Portuguese India Armadas led by Vasco da Gama, though Seychelles was likely already known to Arab navigators and other sailors for many centuries. On 15 March 1503, the scrivener Thomé Lopes noted the sighting of an elevated island, doubtless one of the granitic islands and almost certainly Silhouette Island. The first recorded landing was by the men of the English East India Company ship Ascension, which arrived in Seychelles in January 1609. The islands were claimed by France in 1756. Seychelles remained uninhabited until the first settlers arrived on board the ship Thélemaque, which arrived on 27 August 1770. Captain Leblanc Lecore landed the first colonists, comprising 15 white men, eight Africans and five Indians. The Seychellois Creole language developed as a means of communication between the different races. The British frigate Orpheus commanded by Captain Henry Newcome arrived at Mahé on 16 May 1794. Terms of capitulation were drawn up and the next day Seychelles was surrendered to Britain. Following the fall of Mauritius to British forces, Captain Phillip Beaver of the Nisus arrived at Mahé on 23 April 1811 and took possession of Seychelles as a permanent colony of Britain. The Seychelles became an independent republic in 1976. Following a coup d'état, a socialist one-party state ruled the country from 1977 to 1993. The subsequent democratic Presidential elections were won by candidates of the same party.

== Pre-colonial history ==
The early (pre-European colonisation) history of Isle de Séchelles or Seychelles is unknown. Austronesians from Borneo, who eventually settled on Madagascar, perhaps lingered here circa 200–300 AD. Arab navigators, on trading voyages across the Indian Ocean, were probably aware of the islands, although they did not settle them.

Arabs were trading the highly valued coco de mer nuts, found only in Seychelles, long before European discovery of the islands. The rotted-out nuts can float and were found washed ashore in the Maldives and Indonesia.

== Age of Discovery and colonisation ==
On 15 March 1503, Vasco da Gama, crossing from India to East Africa, sighted what was almost certainly Silhouette Island and the next day, Desroches Island. The granitic islands began to appear on Portuguese charts as the Seven Sisters.

In March 1608, a trading fleet of the English East India Company set sail for India. Lost in a storm, the Ascension's crew saw "high land" on 19 January 1609 and headed for it. They anchored "as in a pond". They found an uninhabited island with plentiful fresh water, fish, coconuts, birds, turtles and giant tortoises with which to replenish their stores. The Ascension sailed, and reported what they had found, but the British took no action.

Seychelles, Praslin, Silhouette, and others adjacent islands in the Indian Ocean, by Captain D. Crichton, 1751 - 25 July 1774

Towards the end of the 17th century, pirates arrived in the Indian Ocean from the Caribbean and made a base in Madagascar, from where they preyed upon vessels approaching and leaving the Red Sea and the Persian Gulf.

The French had occupied the Isle de France (now Mauritius) since 1715. This colony was growing in importance, and in 1735 an energetic administrator, Bertrand-François Mahé de La Bourdonnais was appointed. His brief was to protect the French sea route to India. La Bourdonnais, himself a sailor, turned his attention to making a speedier passage from Mauritius to India. To this end, in 1742, he sent an expedition under the command of Lazare Picault to accurately chart the islands northeast of Madagascar.

On 21 November 1742, the Elisabeth and the Charles anchored off Mahé at Anse Boileau (not Baie Lazare, later mistakenly named as Picault's landing place). They found a land of plenty. In fact, Picault named the island Ile d'Abondance. Picault's mapping was poor, so in 1744 he was sent back and renamed the main island Mahé (in honour of his patron Mahé de La Bourdonnais), and the group the Iles de la Bourdonnais. He had high hopes for the Iles de la Bourdonnais. However, the islands were once more forgotten when La Bourdonnais was replaced in 1746.

== French settlement and rule ==
The outbreak in 1754 of what would become the Seven Years' War between Great Britain and France reminded the authorities on Mauritius about the islands. Two ships were sent to claim them, commanded by Corneille Nicholas Morphey. He renamed the largest island Isle de Séchelles in honour of Viscount Jean Moreau de Séchelles, Minister of Finance during the reign of Louis XV (later Anglicised as Seychelles). This name was later used for the island group, while Mahé was again used for the largest granitic island. Morphey took possession for the French king and the French East India Company on 1 November 1756.

The end of the Seven Years' War, with France's loss of Canada and its status in India, caused the decline of the French East India Company, which had formerly controlled Mauritius. This settlement, and thus Seychelles, now came under direct royal authority. The new intendant of Mauritius, Pierre Poivre (1719–1786), was determined to break the Dutch monopoly of the lucrative spice trade; he thought Mahé would be perfect for spice cultivation.

In 1768, Nicolas Dufresne arranged a commercial venture, sending ships to collect timber and tortoises from the Seychelles. During this expedition, French sovereignty was extended to cover all the islands of the granitic group on Christmas Day.

In 1769, the navigators Rochon and Grenier proved that a faster route to India could safely be taken via the Seychelles, and thus the importance of the islands' strategic position was realised. Meanwhile, Poivre had finally obtained seedlings of nutmeg and clove, and 10,000 nutmeg seeds. His attempts to propagate them on Mauritius and Bourbon (later named Réunion) met with little success, and he thought again of Seychelles. It was considered fortuitous when Brayer du Barré (unknown-1777) arrived on Mauritius with royal permission to run a settlement on St Anne at his own expense.

Plan of the Harbour of Seychelles, from an actual survey made in 1771

On 12 August 1770, 15 white colonists, seven slaves, five Indians and one black woman settled on St Anne. Du Barré stayed in Mauritius seeking funds. After reports of initial success, he begged the government for more money. However, reports reached the authorities that ship captains could get no supplies of fresh produce from the islands. Du Barré's appeals for help to Mauritius and Versailles fell on deaf ears. In desperation, he went to the Seychelles to try and rescue the situation, but to no avail. A ruined man, he left for India and died there shortly afterwards.

French colonists then brought large numbers of creole slaves from Mauritius to the Seychelles – they became the ancestors of the present population.

In 1771, Poivre sent Antoine Gillot to Seychelles to establish a spice garden. By August 1772, Du Barré's people had abandoned St Anne and moved to Mahé or returned home. Gillot worked on at Anse Royale, establishing nutmeg, cloves, cinnamon and pepper plants.

When British ships were seen around Seychelles, the authorities were spurred into action, despatching a garrison under Lieutenant de Romainville. They built Etablissement du Roi (Royal Settlement) on the site of modern Victoria. Gillot was nominally in charge of the civilian colonists but had no real authority over them. Mauritius sent as replacement a man of stronger mettle, Jean Baptiste Philogene de Malavois, who assumed command of the settlement in 1788. He drew up 30 decrees which protected the timber and tortoises. In future, only sound farming techniques and careful husbanding of resources would be tolerated.

The British frigate Orpheus commanded by Captain Henry Newcome arrived at Mahé on 16 May 1794, together with the Centurion, the Resistance and two prizes. An officer was sent ashore to request provisions and water. Quinssy proposed that having no means to oppose the enemy, the colony should surrender. Terms of capitulation were drawn up and the next day Seychelles was surrendered to Britain. The Centurion returned to Seychelles four years later in September 1798 and renewed the capitulation.

== Quincy era ==
In 1790, as a result of the French Revolution, the settlers formed a Colonial Assembly and decided they would run their colony themselves, according to their own constitution. Land in Seychelles should only go to the children of existing colonists, who should dispose of the colony's produce as they chose, not as Mauritius dictated. They deemed the abolition of slavery impossible because they believed that without free labour, the colony could not survive.

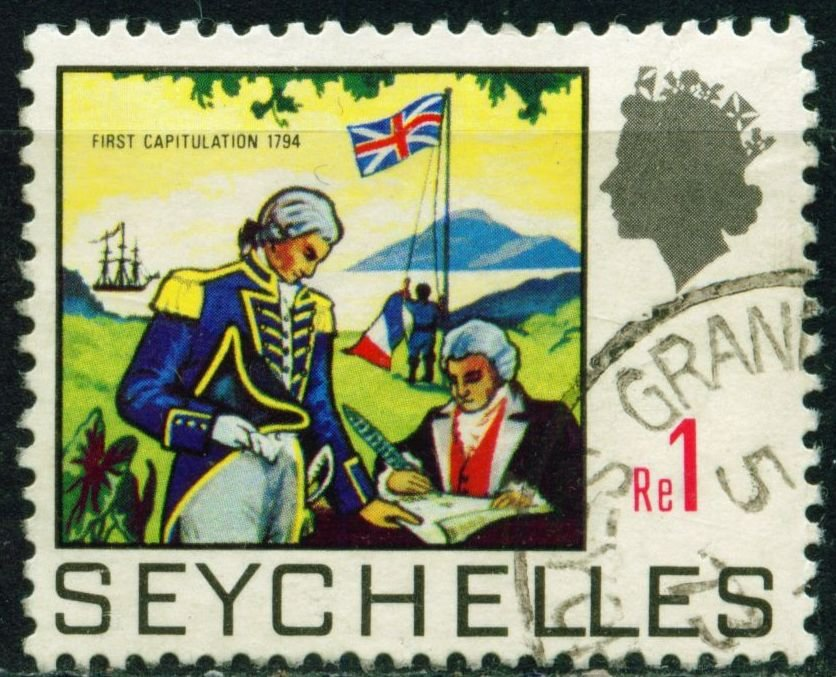
1969 stamp commemorating the British occupation of 1794

Jean-Baptiste Queau de Quincy (1748–1827) took command of the colony in 1794. A wily man, he used skill and expediency to steer Seychelles through the years of war ahead. Seychelles acted as a haven for French corsairs (pirates carrying lettres de marque entitling them to prey legally on enemy shipping). Quincy hoped this might go unnoticed, but in 1794 a squadron of three British ships arrived led by the frigate "Orpheus" commanded by Henry Newcome. Quinssy proposed that having no means to oppose the enemy, the colony should surrender. Terms of capitulation were drawn up and the next day Seychelles was surrendered to Britain.

The British made no effort to take over the Seychelles; it was considered a waste of resources. The settlers decided that unless they were sent a garrison, they could not be expected to defend the French flag. Therefore, they would remain neutral, supplying all comers. The strategy worked. The colony flourished. Quincy's favourable terms of capitulation were renewed seven times during the visits of British ships.

On 11 July 1801, the French frigate Chiffonne arrived with a cargo of French prisoners sent into exile by Napoleon. Then HMS Sybille arrived. Quincy had to try to defend the Chiffonne, but after a brief battle, the Chiffonne was taken. Captain Adam of the Sybille wanted to know why Quincy had interfered, in contravention of his capitulation terms. Quincy managed to talk his way out of the difficulty, and even persuaded Adam to agree to Seychelles' vessels flying a flag bearing the words "Seychelles Capitulation", allowing them to pass through the British blockade of Mauritius unmolested.

15 September 1801 was the date of a memorable sea battle just off the settlement. The British ship Victor was seriously disabled by damage to her rigging, but she was able to manoeuvre broadside to the French vessel La Flêche and rake her with incessant fire. La Flêche began to sink. Rather than surrender her, her captain ran her aground, torching her before abandoning ship. The opposing commanders met ashore afterwards, the Englishman warmly congratulating his French counterpart on his courage and skill during the battle.

The British tightened the blockade on the French Indian Ocean colonies. Réunion surrendered, followed in December 1810 by Mauritius. In April 1811, Captain Beaver arrived in Seychelles on the Nisus to announce the preferential terms of Quincy's capitulation should stand, but Seychelles must recognise the terms of the Mauritian surrender. Beaver left behind a Royal Marine, Lieutenant Bartholomew Sullivan, to monitor the Seychelles situation.

== British rule ==
There was little Sullivan could do alone to stop the settlers continuing to provision French frigates and slavers. Slave ownership was not then against British law, although slave trading was illegal. Sullivan, later given the title of Civil Agent, played cat and mouse with the pro-slaver colonists. Once, acting on a tip off, Sullivan was rowed over to Praslin and was able to confiscate a cargo of newly landed slaves. It was but a small triumph amidst many frustrations, and Sullivan, complaining that the Seychellois had "no sense of honour, shame or honesty",

The first civilian administrator of the British regime was Edward Madge. He had a bitter feud with Quincy, who remained in the administration as Justice of the Peace. In the following years, the islands became a backwater ticking over quietly. Seychellois landowners had a pleasant life, though making ends meet given the fickle markets for their produce was not always easy. The British had allowed all customary French practices to remain in place. The administrator may have been British, reporting to London, but he governed according to French rules. The biggest grievance the colonists had with their new masters was the colony's dependence on Mauritius.

The other cloud on the planters' horizon was British anti-slavery legislation. In 1835, slavery was completely abolished. The plantations were already in decline, their soils exhausted by years of cultivation without investment in renewing fertility. Some planters took their slaves and left. The liberated slaves had no land, and most squatted on the estates they had tended in bondage, and the colony entered a period of stagnation. There were no exports and no money to pay for new infrastructure.

The situation was only improved when planters realised they could grow coconuts with less labour and more profit than the traditional crops of cotton, sugar, rice, and maize. Soon, they also had a source of virtually free labour once again. The British took their anti-slavery stance seriously, and operated patrols along the East African coast, raiding Arab dhows transporting slaves to the Middle East. Slaves liberated south of the Equator were brought to Seychelles and apprenticed to plantation owners. They worked the land in return for rations and wages. Over a period of thirteen years from 1861, around 2,400 men, women and children were brought to Seychelles.

The town, called Victoria since 1841, began to grow. Licences granted in 1879 give some idea of the range of businesses in the town. There was a druggist, two auctioneers, five retailers, four liquor stores, a notary, an attorney, a jeweller, and a watchmaker.

There was a disaster on 12 October 1862, when torrential rain and strong winds hit Mahé. An avalanche of mud and rocks fell on the town from the hills. It has been estimated that over 70 people lost their lives.

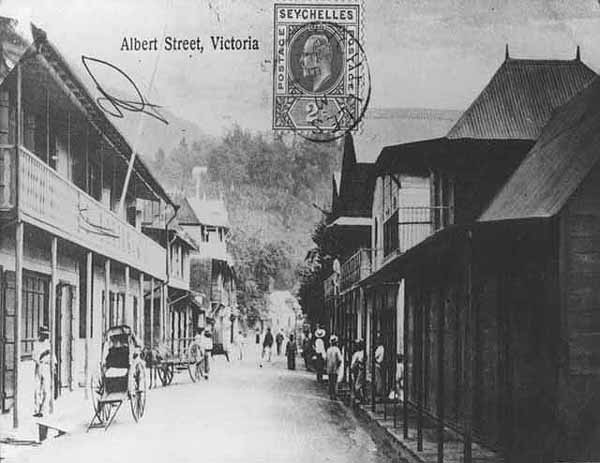
Albert Street Victoria Seychelles 1900s

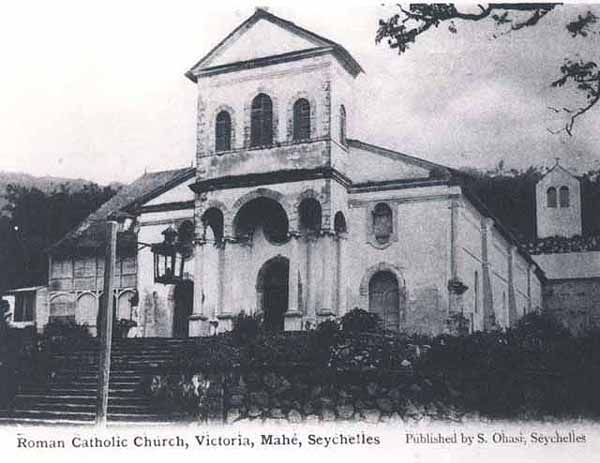
Church Victoria Seychelles 1900s

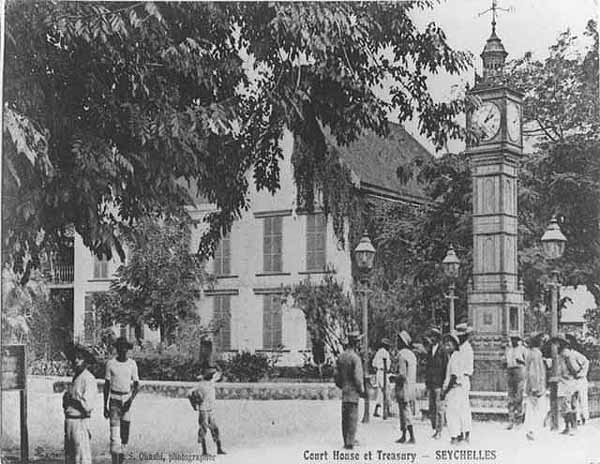
Clock court treasury Victoria Seychelles 1900s

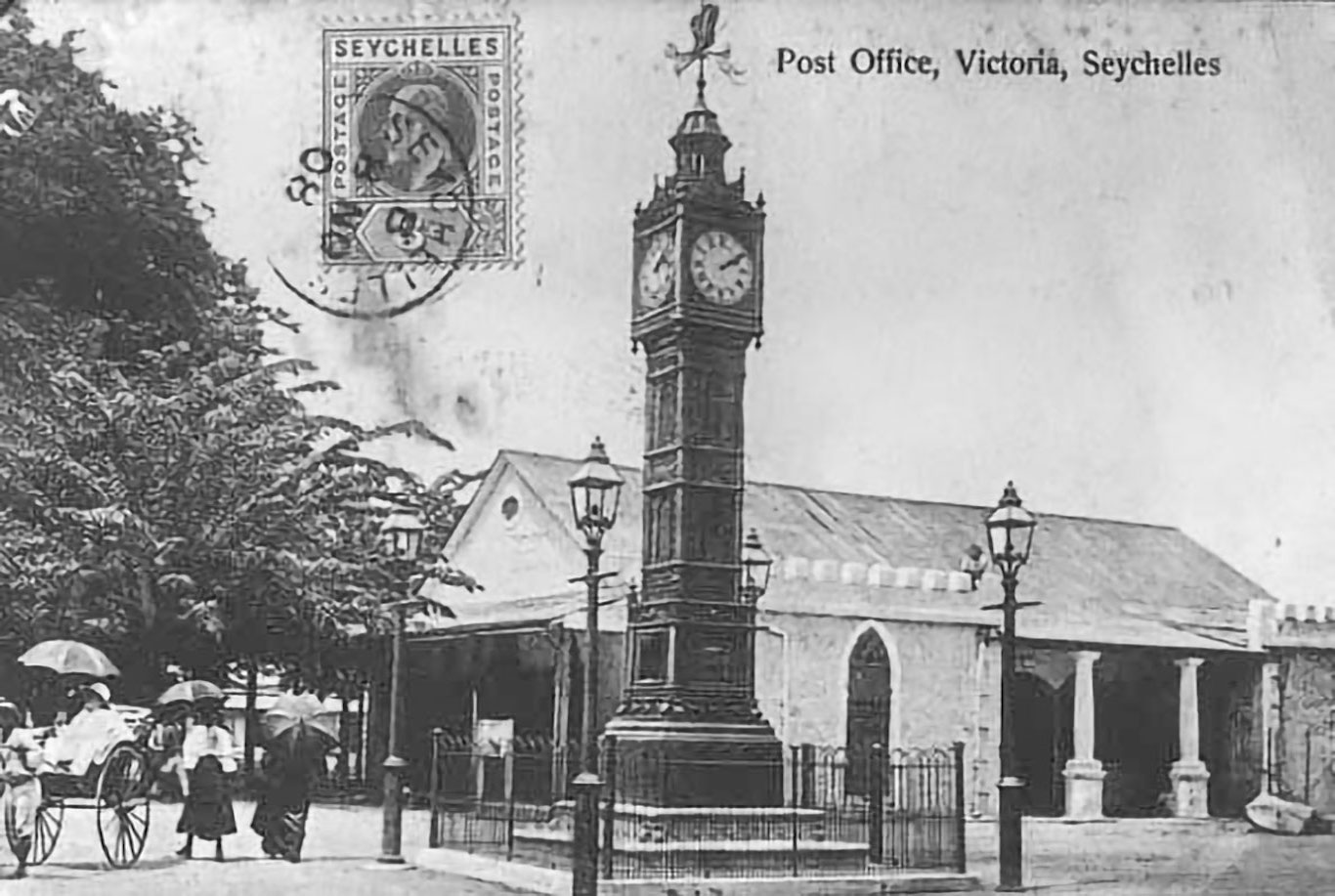
Post office clock tower, Victoria Seychelles 1900s

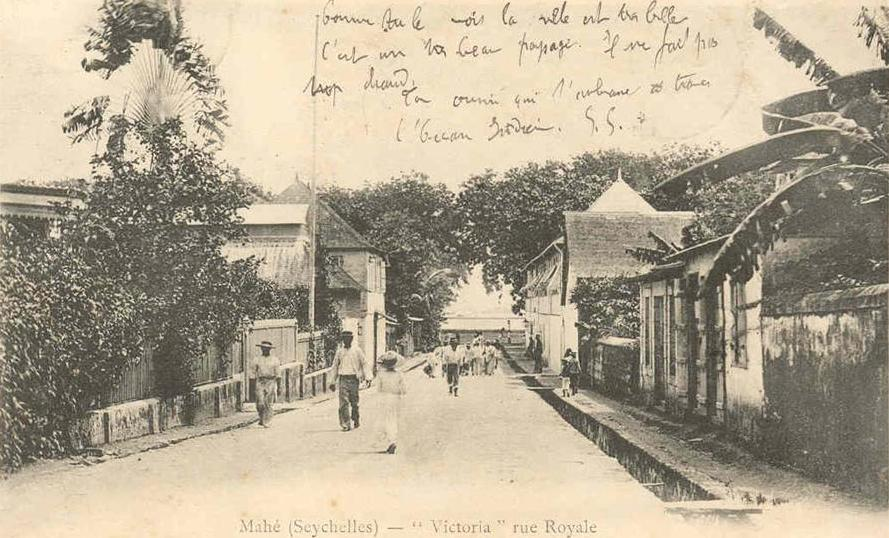
Postcard Mahe 1903

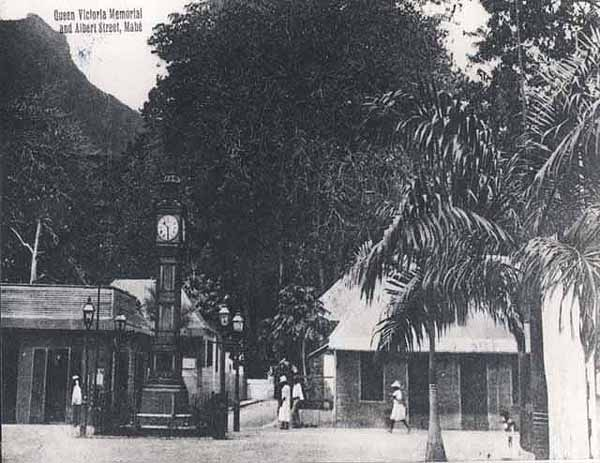
Queen Victoria Memorial Seychelles 1900s.jpg

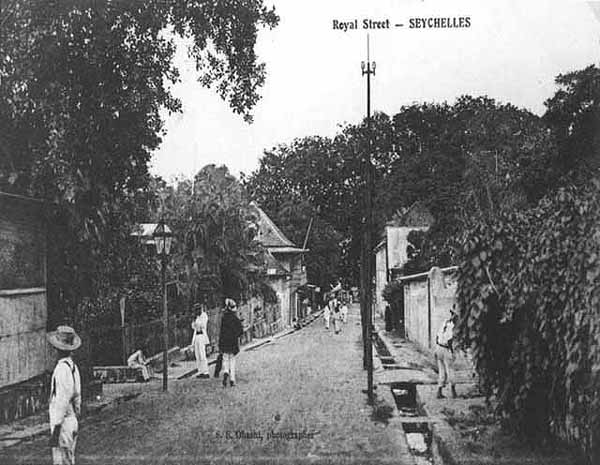
Royal Street Victoria Seychelles 1900s.jpg

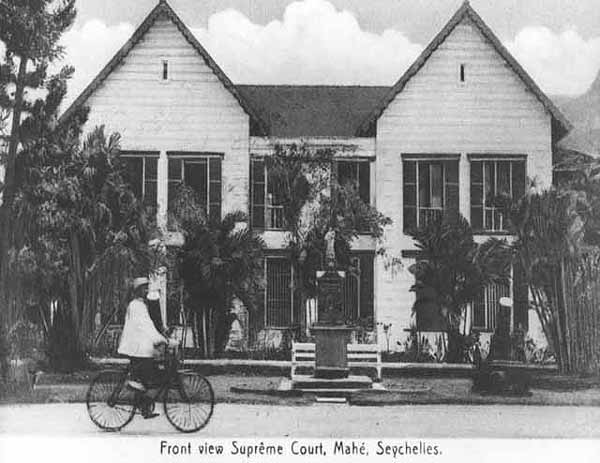
Supreme Court, Seychelles 1900s

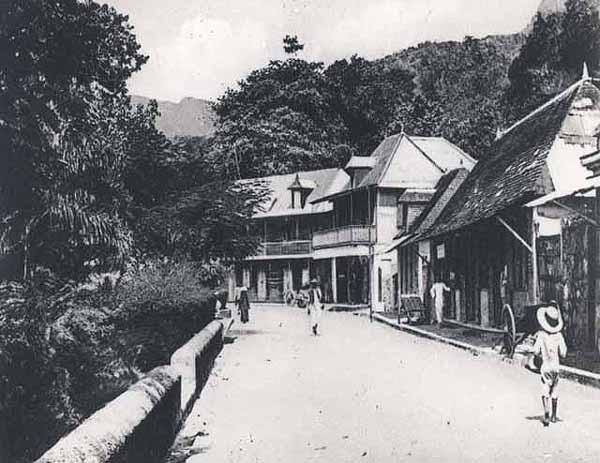
Victoria buildings, Seychelles 1900s

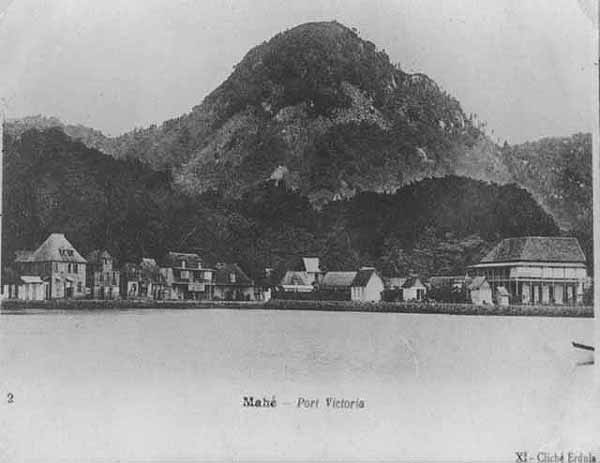
Victoria, Seychelles, 1900s

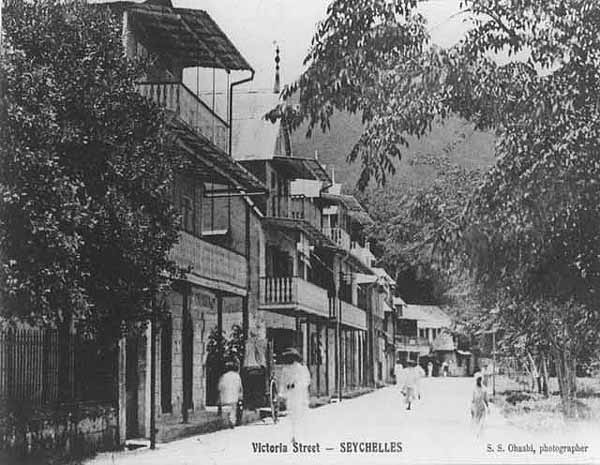
Victoria Street, Victoria, Seychelles 1900s

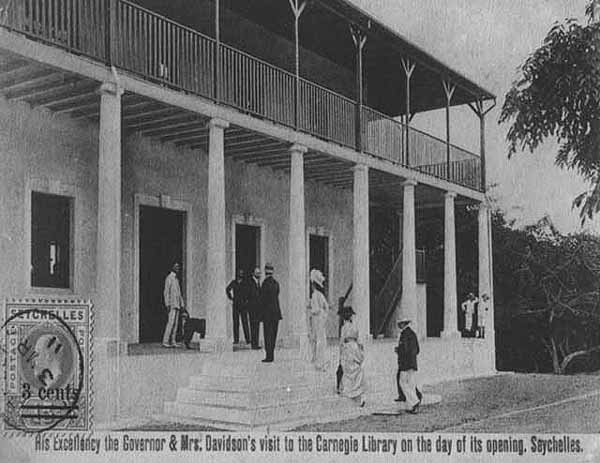
Library of Seychelles opening 1910.jpg

=== Crown Colony ===
Flag of Seychelles (1903–1961)

Seychellois officials wanted Seychelles to organised as a separate autonomous colony within the British Empire, and the authorities in the mother colony, Mauritius, supported them. Sir Arthur Gordon, the Mauritian governor, sent a petition on their behalf to London. Concessions were made, but Seychelles did not become a Crown Colony in its own right until 1903 when its first Governor, Sir Ernest Bickham Sweet-Escott took office. Befitting its new status, the colony acquired a botanical garden and a clock tower in the heart of Victoria. The French language and culture remained dominant, however.

The British, like the French before them, saw Seychelles as a useful place to exile troublesome political prisoners. Over the years, Seychelles became a home to prisoners from Zanzibar, Egypt, Cyprus and Palestine, to name but a few. The first in the line of exiles was Sultan Abdullah, a sultan in Perak including Lela Pandak Lam, the ex-chief of Pasir Salak in Perak who arrived in 1875 after their implication in the murder of the British Resident of Perak, JW Birch. Like many of the exiles who followed, they settled well into Seychelles life and became genuinely fond of the islands. Sultan Abdullah's son took home with him one of the popular local French tunes by the islanders, "La Rosalie" and incorporated it into the national anthem of his country. With new words, it later became Negaraku, the national anthem of Malaysia.

Perhaps the most famous of the political prisoners was Archbishop Makarios from Cyprus, who arrived in 1956. He likewise fell in love with his prison. "When our ship leaves harbour", he wrote, "we shall take with us many good and kindly memories of the Seychelles...may God bless them all."

World War I caused great hardship in the islands. Ships could not bring in essential goods, nor take away exports. Wages fell; prices soared by 150 per cent. Many turned to crime and the prisons were bursting. Joining the Seychelles Labour Contingent, formed at the request of General Smuts, seemed to offer an escape. It was no easy option, however. The force, 800 strong, was sent to East Africa. After just five months, so many had died from dysentery, malaria and beriberi that the corps was sent home. In all, 335 men died.

By the end of World War I, the population of Seychelles was 24,000 and they were feeling neglected by Great Britain. There was agitation from the newly formed Planters Association for greater representation in the governance of Seychelles affairs. After 1929, a more liberal flow of funds was ensured by the Colonial Development Act, but it was a time of economic depression; the price of copra was falling and so were wages. Workers petitioned the government about their poor working conditions and the burden of tax they had to bear. Governor Sir Arthur Grimble instigated some reforms, exempting lower income groups from taxation. He was keen to create model housing and distribute smallholdings for the landless. Many of his reforms were not approved until World War II had broken out, and everything was put on hold.

The Planters Association lobbied for the white landowners, but until 1937 those who worked for them had no voice. The League of Coloured Peoples was formed to demand a minimum wage, a wage tribunal and free health care for all. During World War II, a seaplane depot was established on St Anne to monitor regional shipping. A garrison was stationed in the islands and a battery built at Pointe Conan to protect the harbour. Some 2,000 Seychellois men served in the Pioneer Companies in Egypt, Palestine and Italy.

At home, Seychelles had turmoil of its own. The first political party, the Taxpayers Association, was formed in 1939. A British governor described it as "the embodiment of every reactionary force in Seychelles", and it was entirely concerned with protecting the interests of the plantocracy. After the war, they also benefited by being granted the vote, which was limited to literate property owners; just 2,000 in a population of 36,000. At the first elections, in 1948, most of those elected to the Legislative Council were predictably members of the Planters and Taxpayers Association.

In 1958, the French bought back the Glorioso islands from the Seychelles.

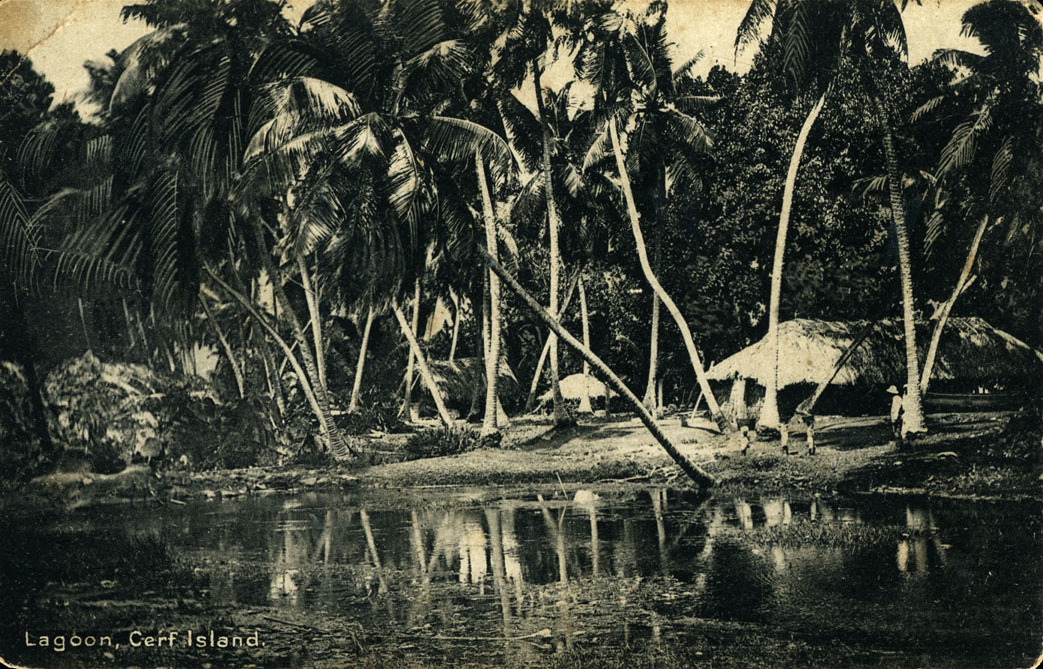
Lagoon at Cerf Island, 1941

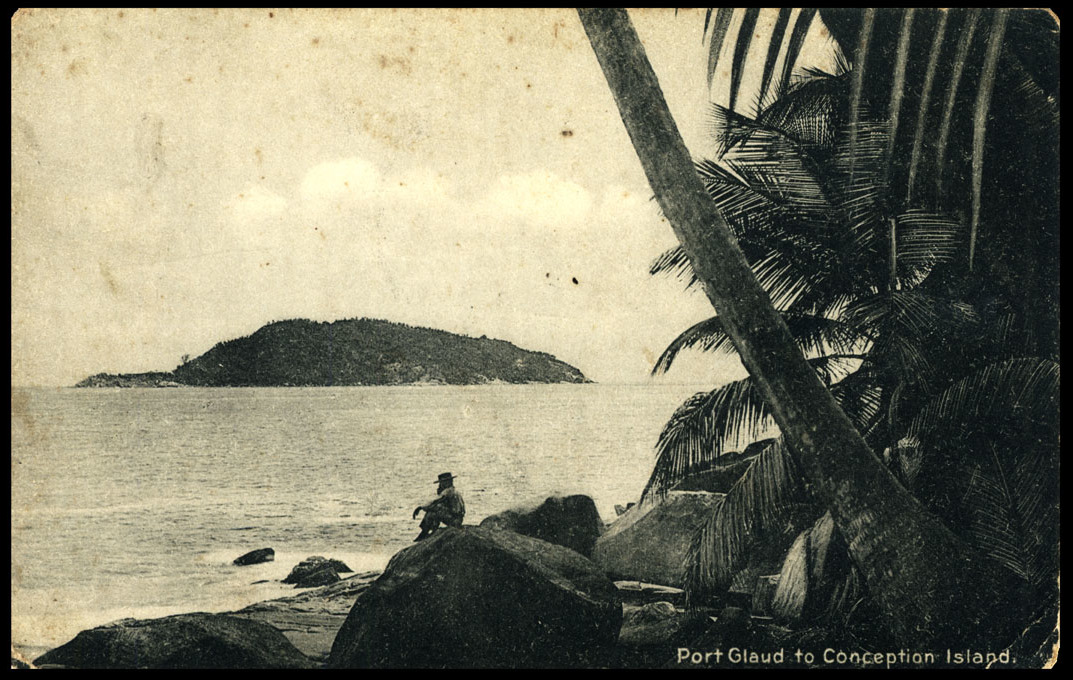
Port Glaud to Conception Island, 1941

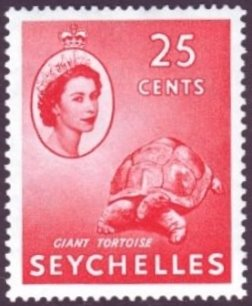
Postage stamp with portrait of Queen Elizabeth II, 1954

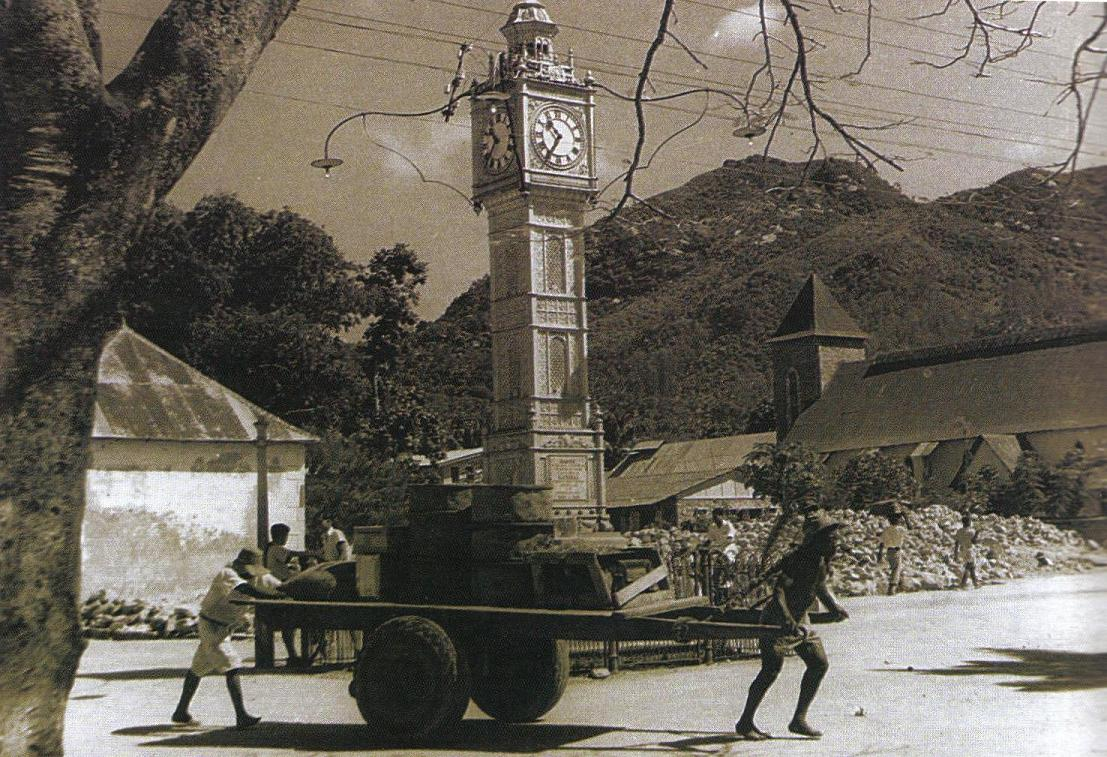
Victoria's clock tower in 1956

== Independence ==
Flag of Seychelles (1961–1976)

Flag of Seychelles (1976–1977)

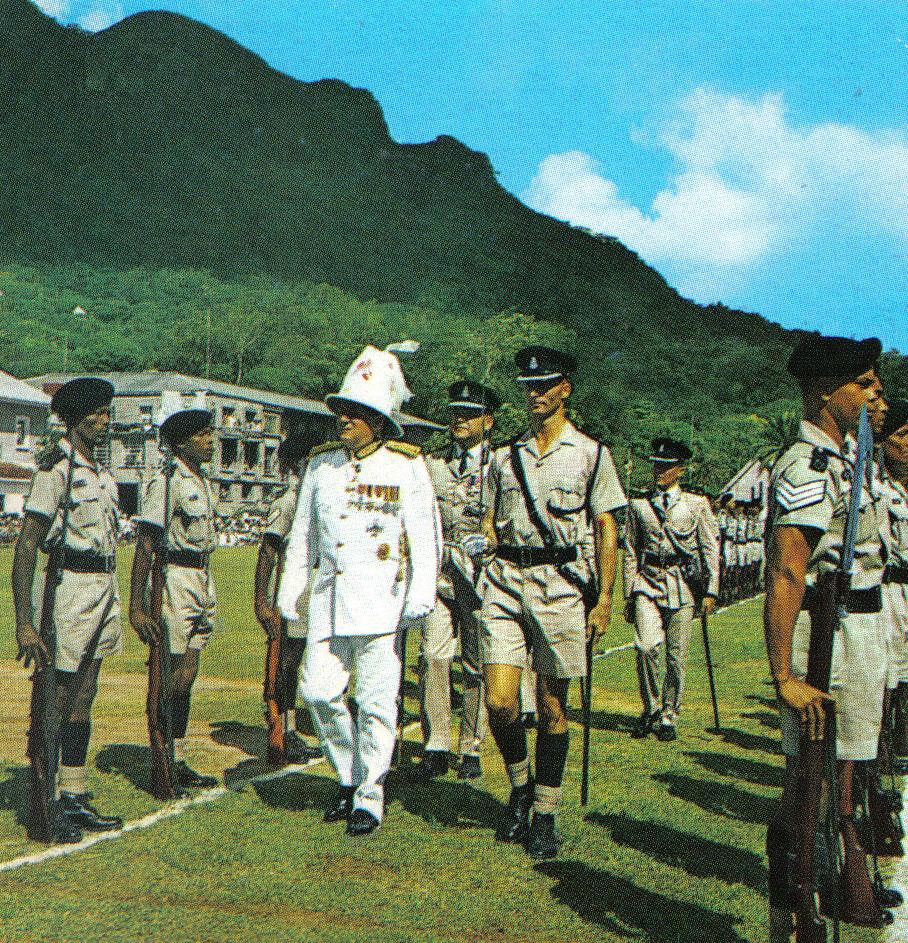
Colonial Governor of the Seychelles inspecting police guard of honour in 1972

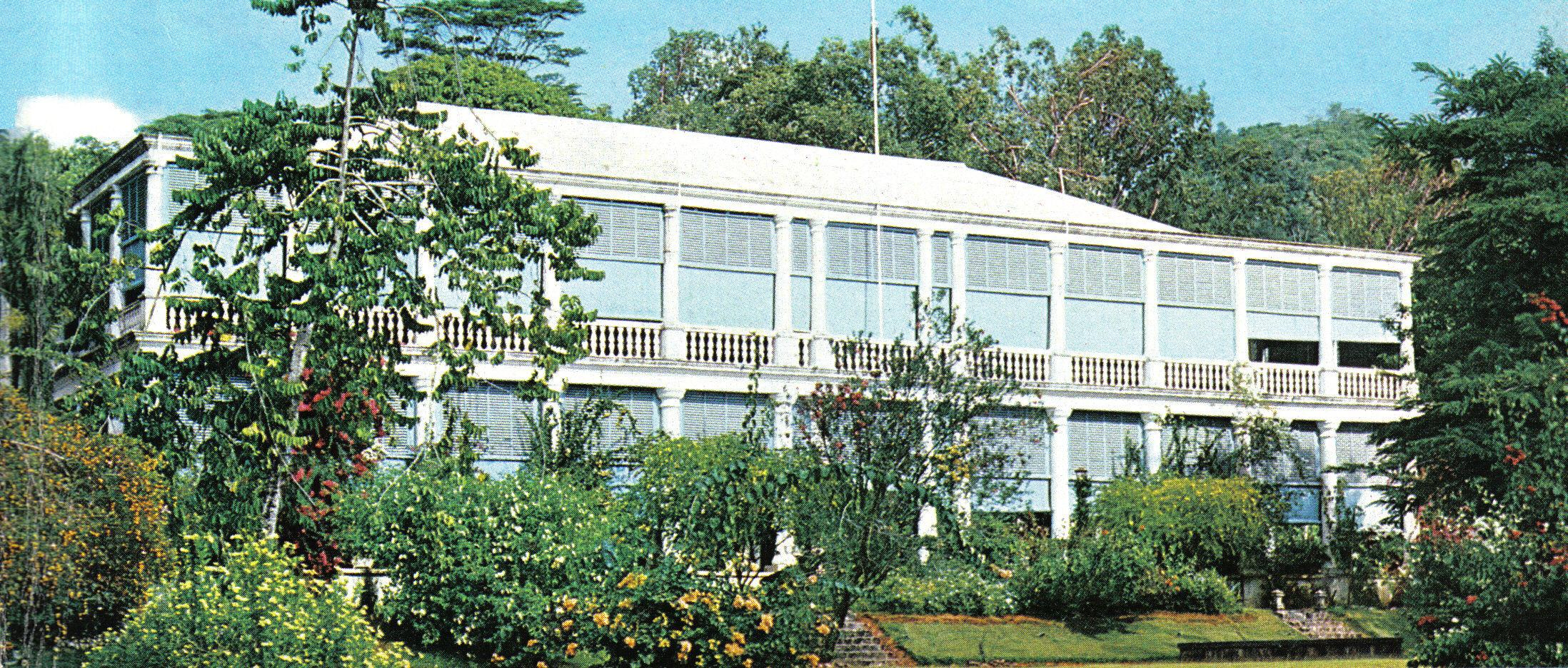
Victoria's State House in the 1970s

It was not until 1964 that any new political movements were created. In that year, the Seychelles People's United Party (SPUP, later Seychelles People's Progressive Front, SPPF) was formed. Led by France-Albert René, they campaigned for socialism and independence from Britain. The late James Mancham's Seychelles Democratic Party (SDP), created the same year, by contrast represented businessmen and planters and wanted closer integration with Britain.

Elections were held in 1966, won by the SDP.

In March 1970, colonial and political representatives of Seychelles met in London for a constitutional convention, with the Seychelles Democratic Party (SDP) of James Mancham advocating closer integration with the UK, and the Seychelles People's United Party (SPUP) of France-Albert René advocating independence. Further elections in November 1970 brought a new constitution into effect, with Mancham as Chief Minister. Further elections were held in April 1974, in which both major political parties campaigned for independence. Following this election, negotiations with the British resulted in an agreement under which the Seychelles became an independent republic within the Commonwealth on 29 June 1976. In 1970, Seychelles got a new constitution, universal adult suffrage, and a government council with an elected majority. Self-government was granted in 1975 and independence in 1976, within the Commonwealth of Nations. In 1975, a coalition government was formed with James R. Mancham as President and France-Albert René as Prime Minister. The newly knighted Sir James Mancham became the country's first President, with René as Prime Minister. These negotiations also restored the islands of Aldabra, Farquhar, and Des Roches, which had been transferred from Seychelles in November 1965 to form part of the new British Indian Ocean Territory (BIOT), to Seychelles upon independence.

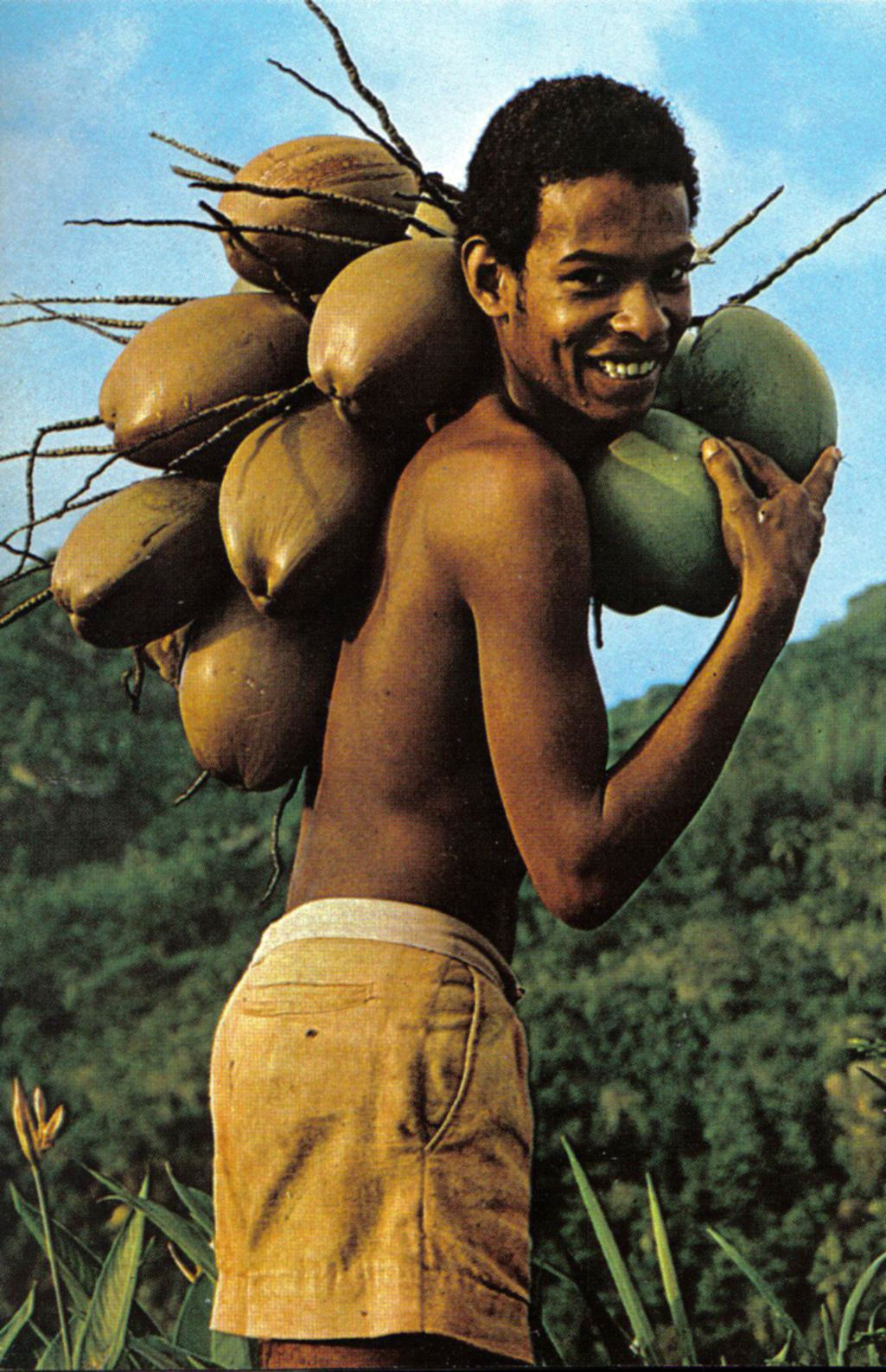
Boy with coconuts Seychelles

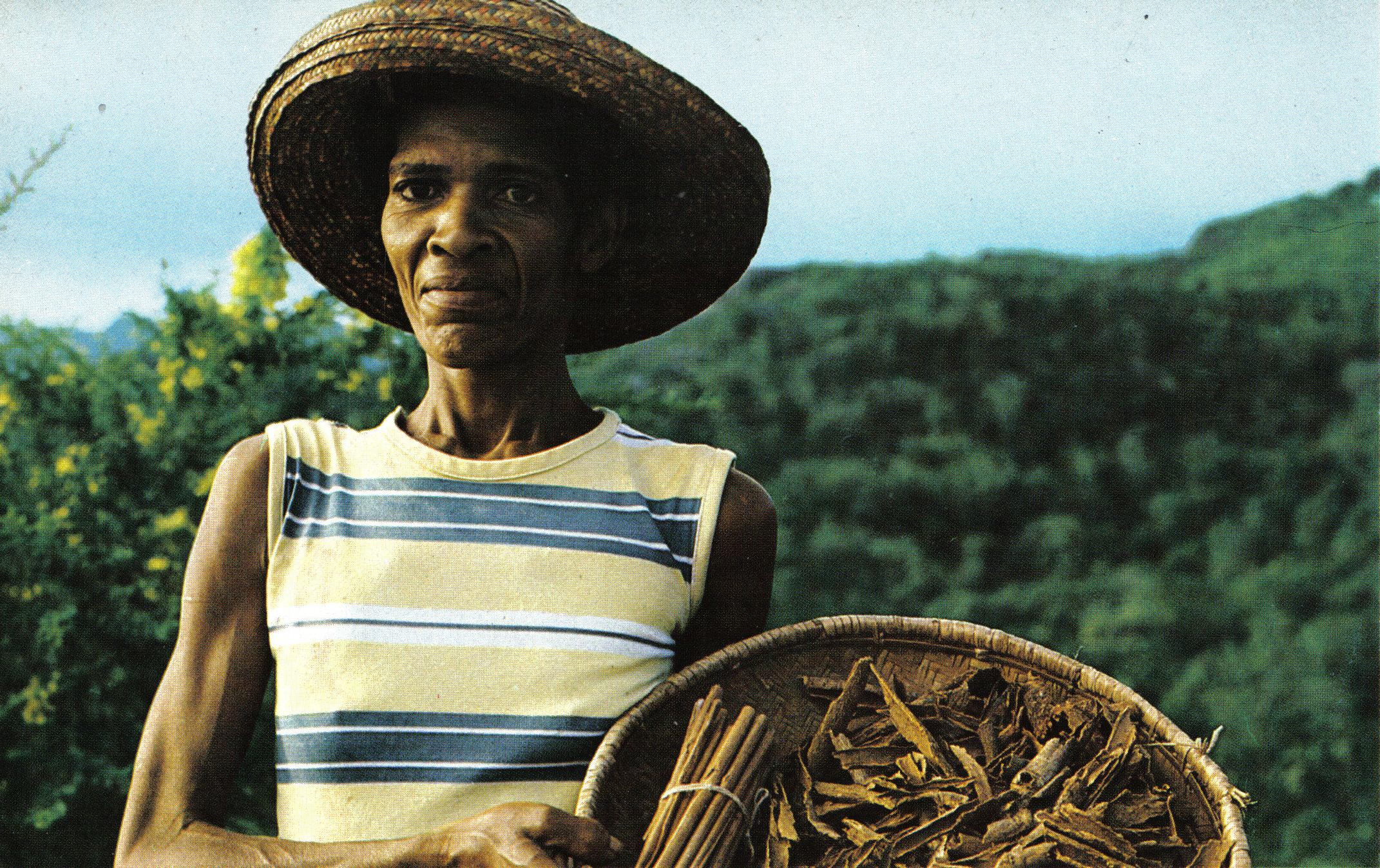
Cinnamon quill maker Seychelles

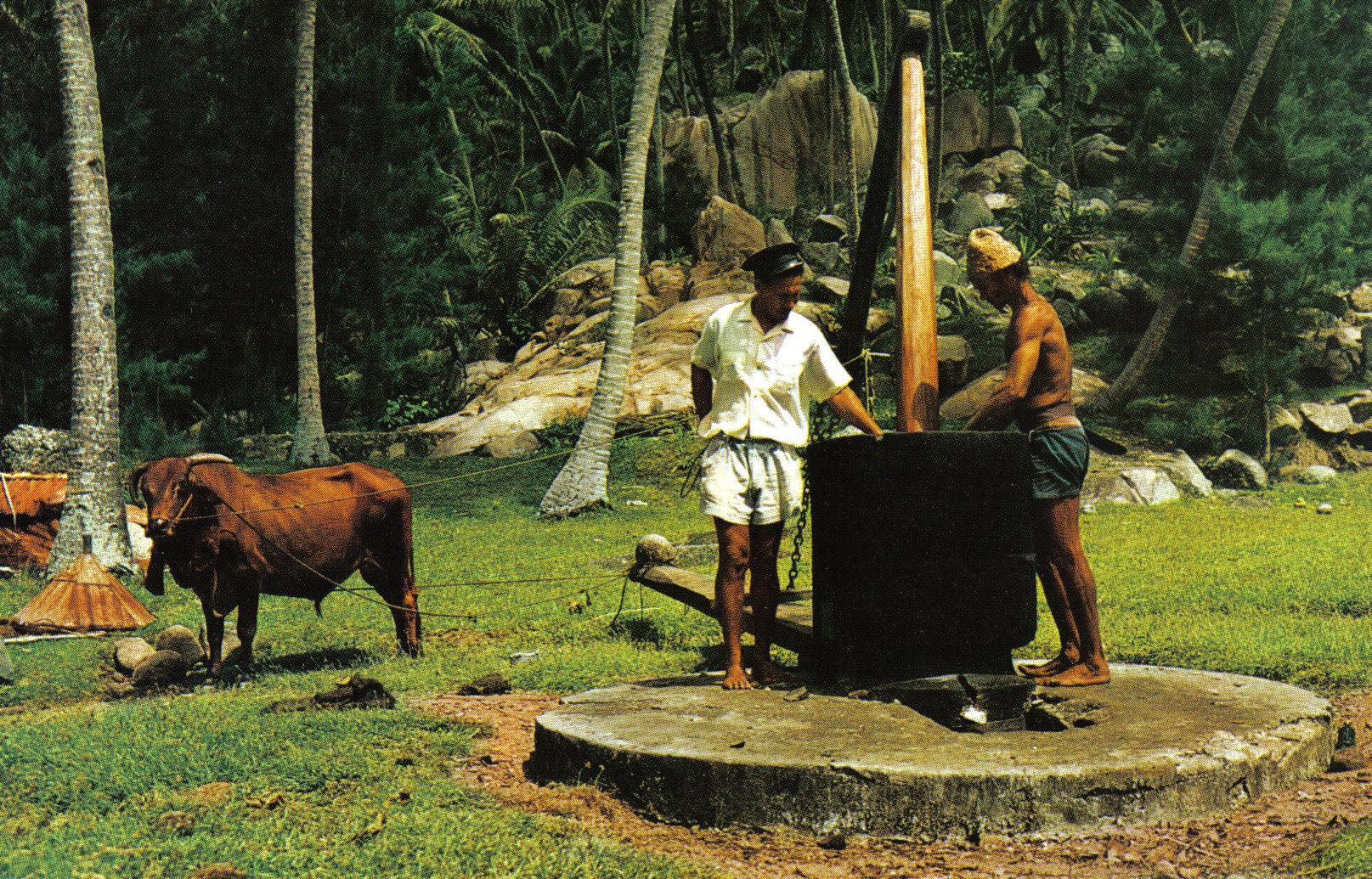
Coconut oil making Seychelles

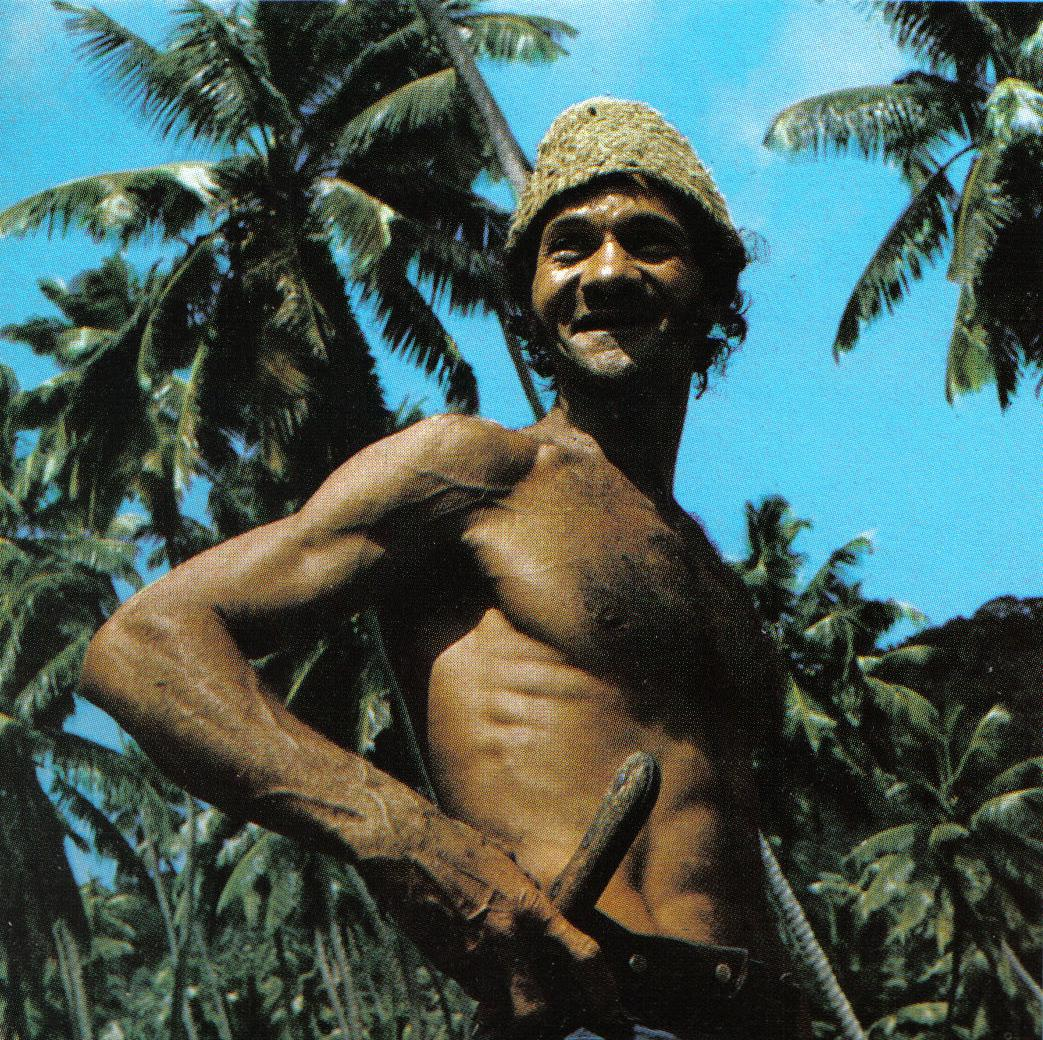
Coconut plantation worker Seychelles

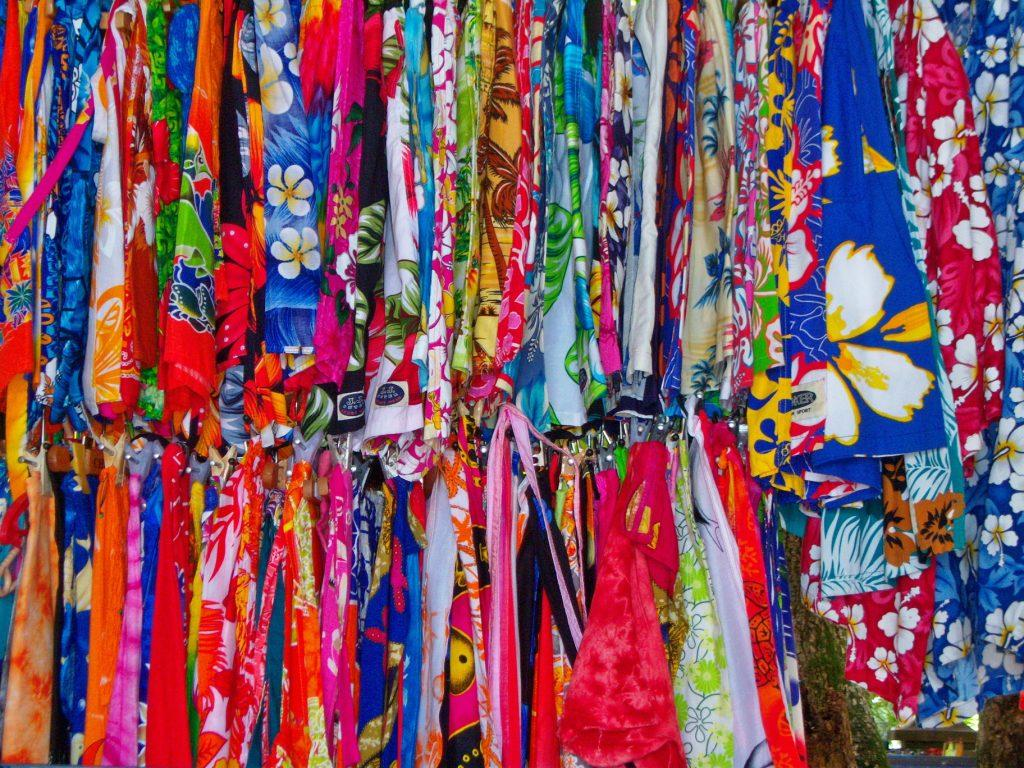
Colourful Skirts at Seychelles Market

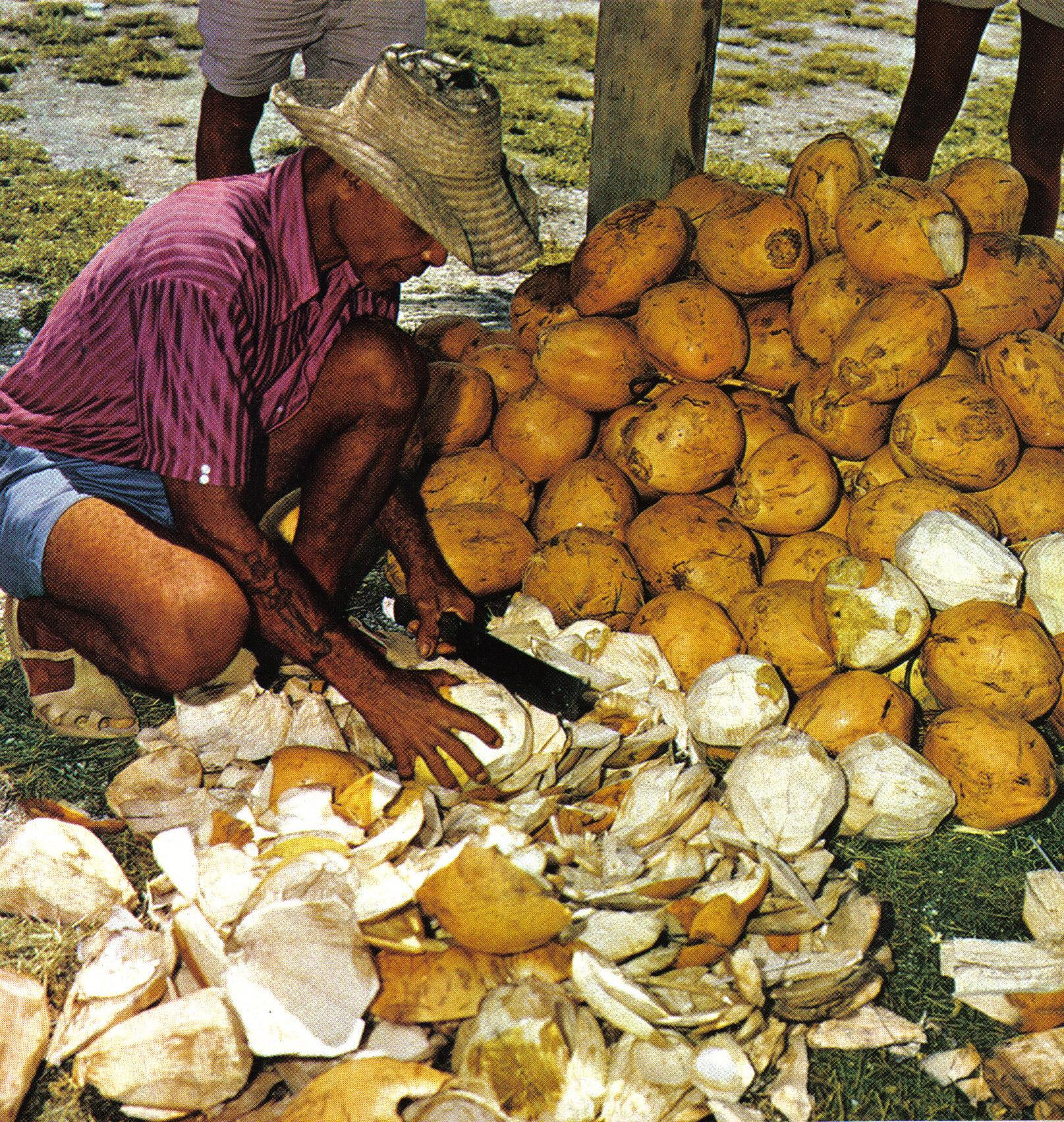
Cutting coconuts Seychelles

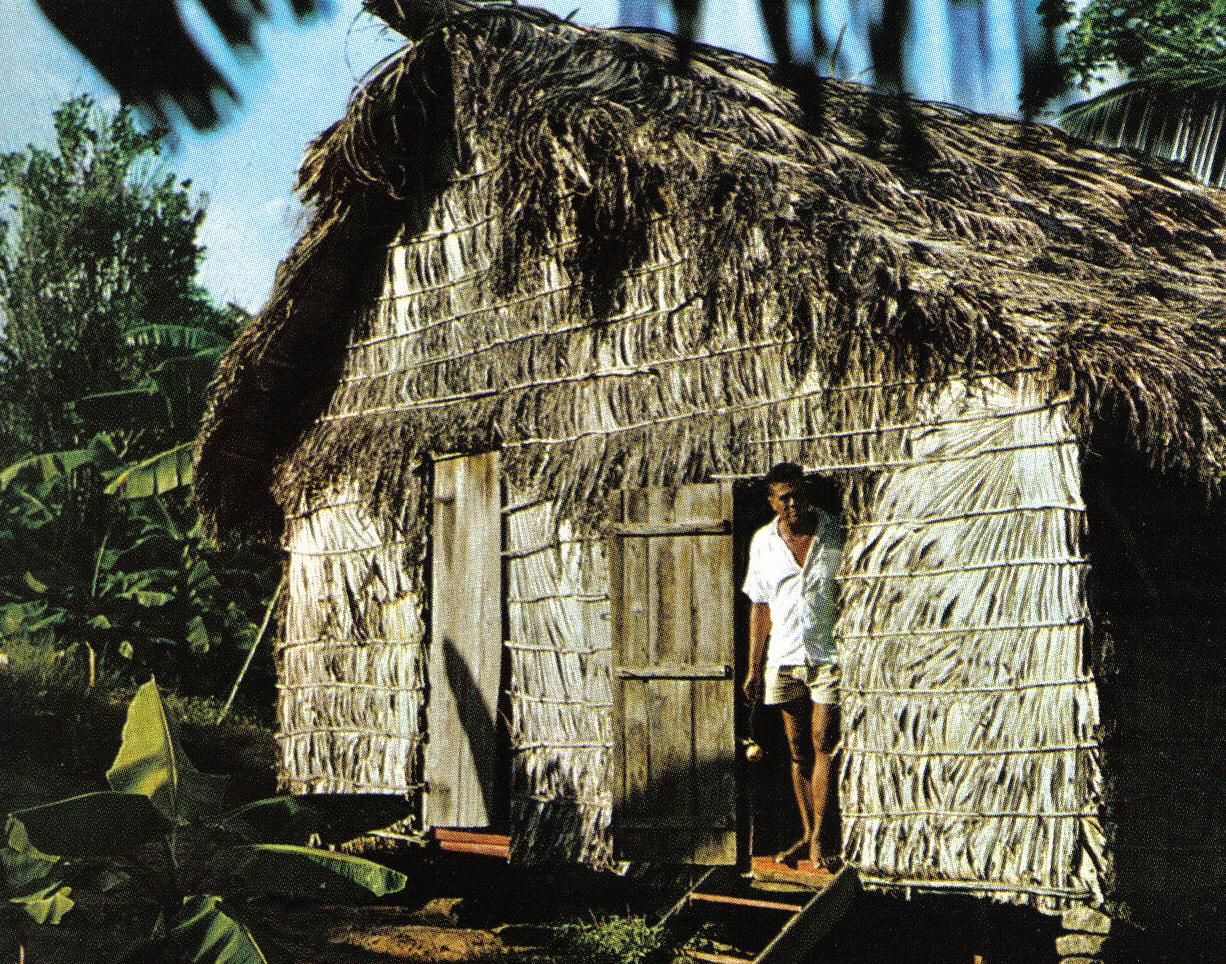
Farmer house Seychelles

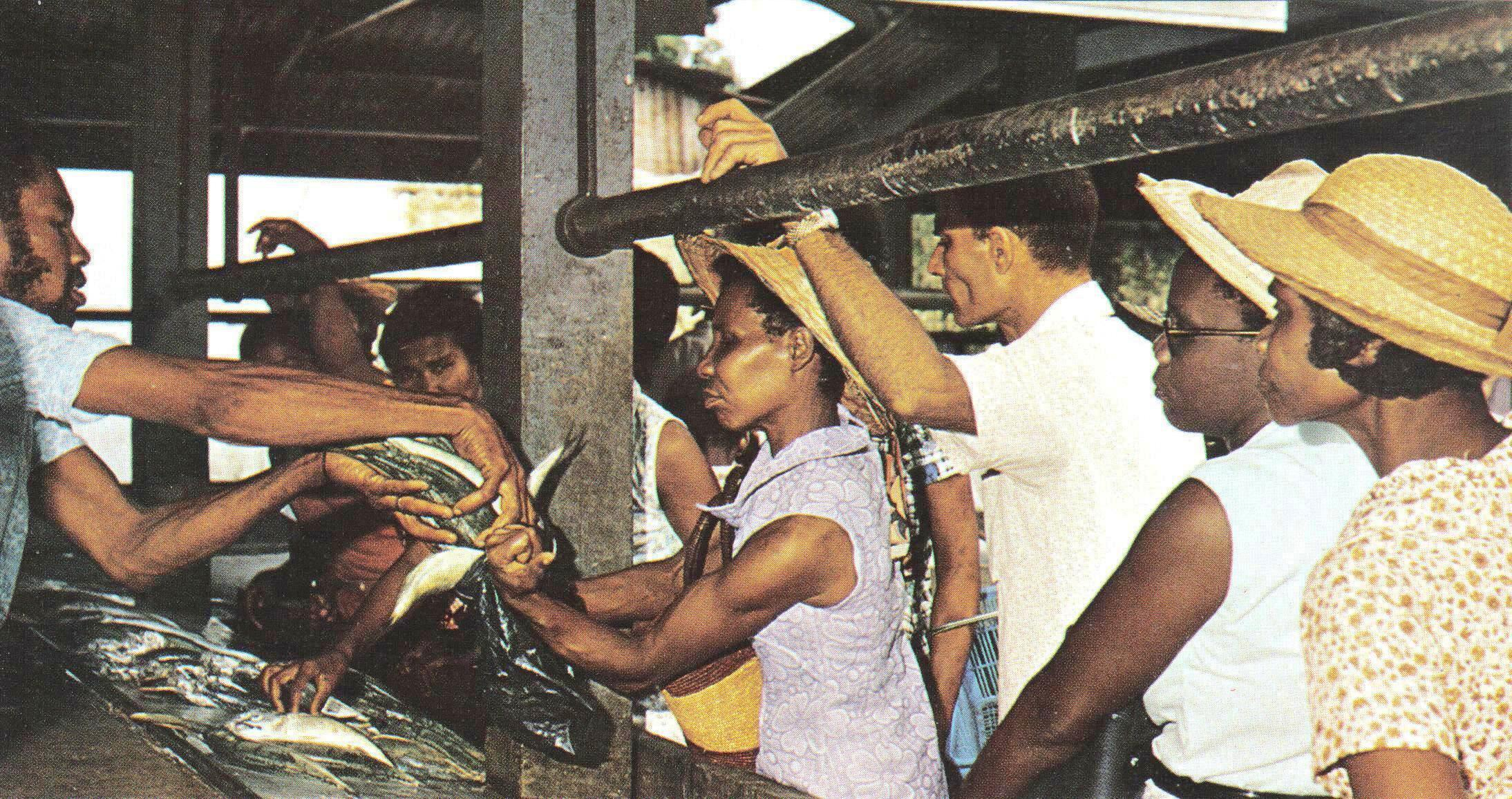
Fish market Seychelles

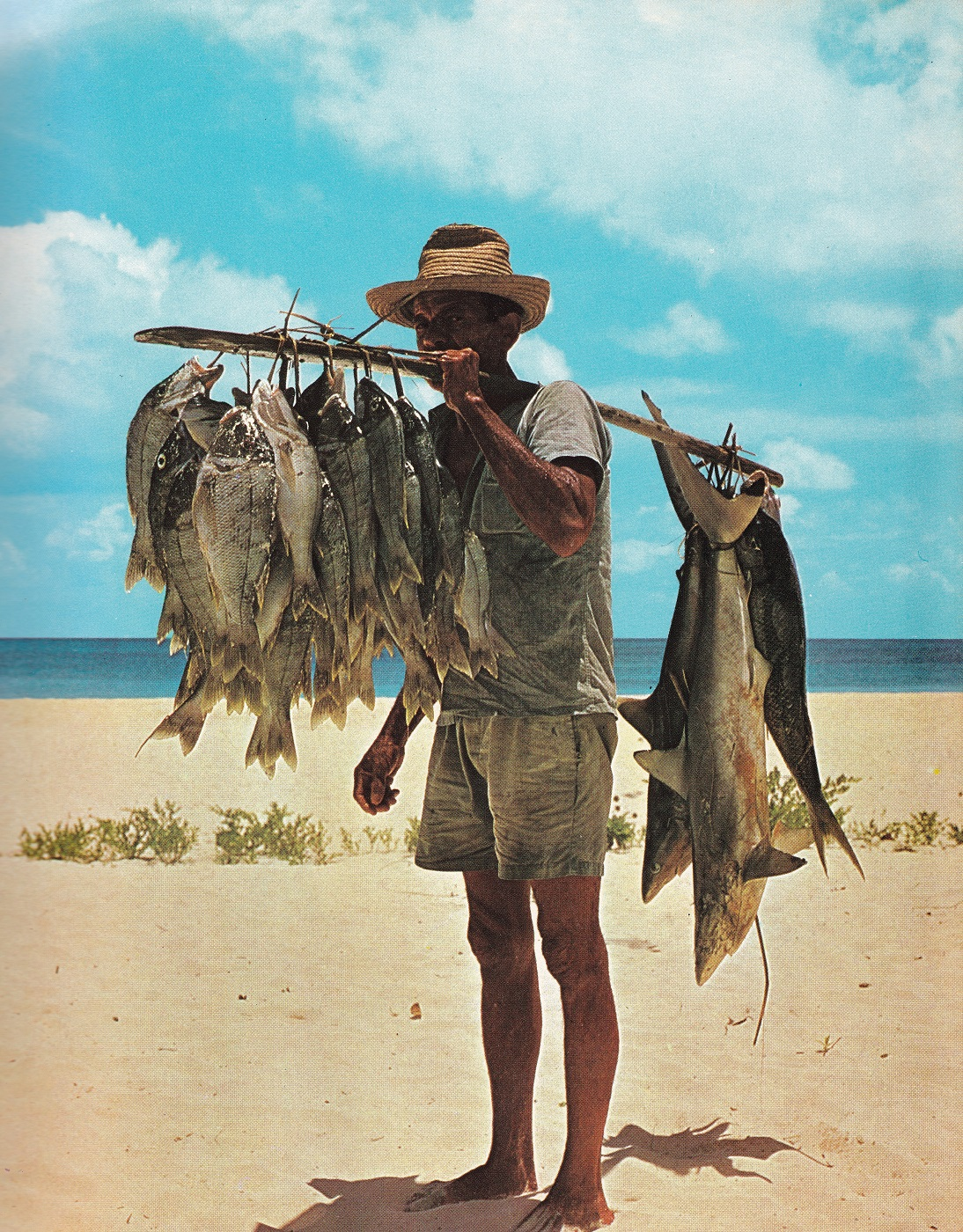
Fisherman and his catch

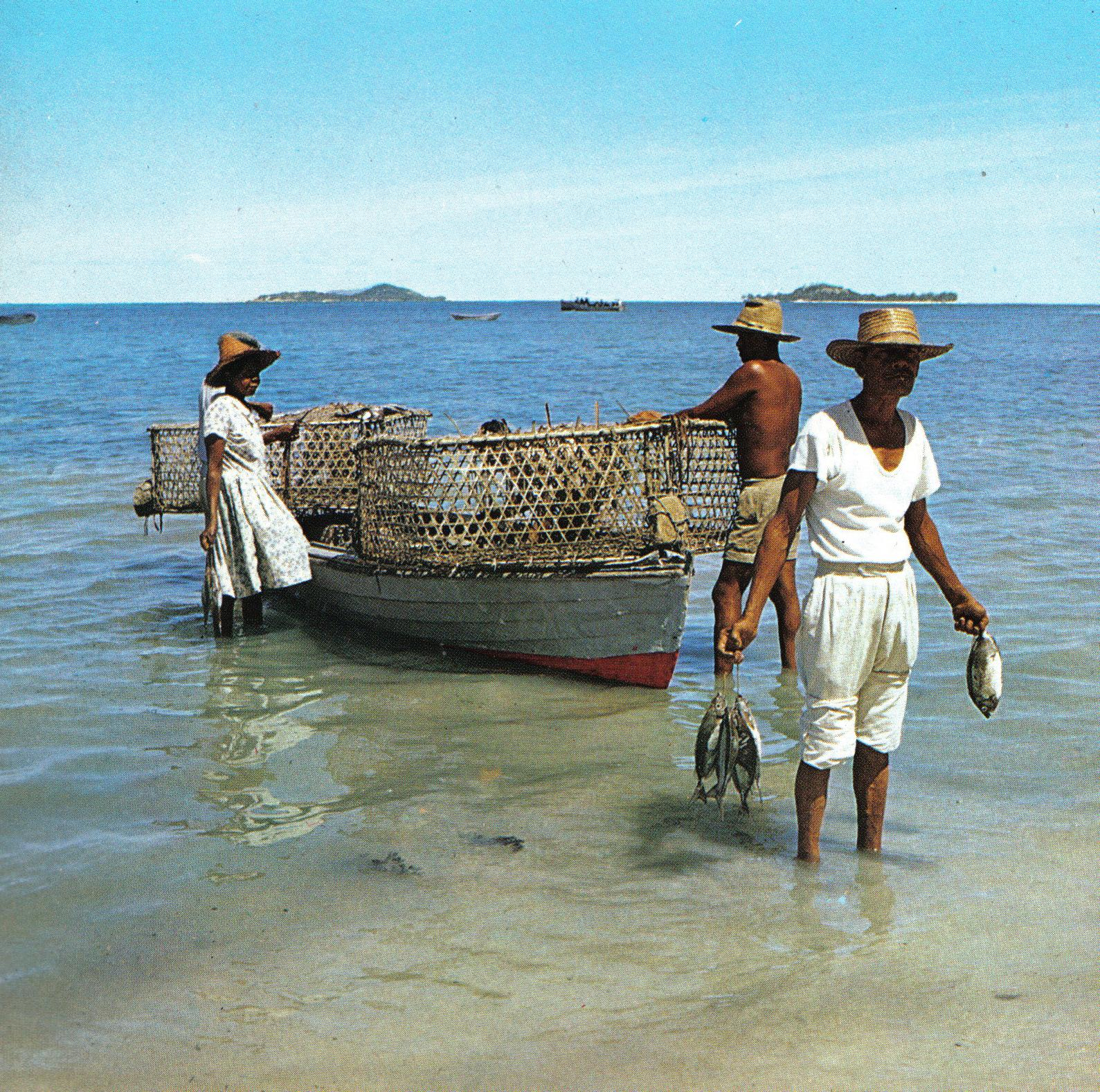
Fisherman Seychelles

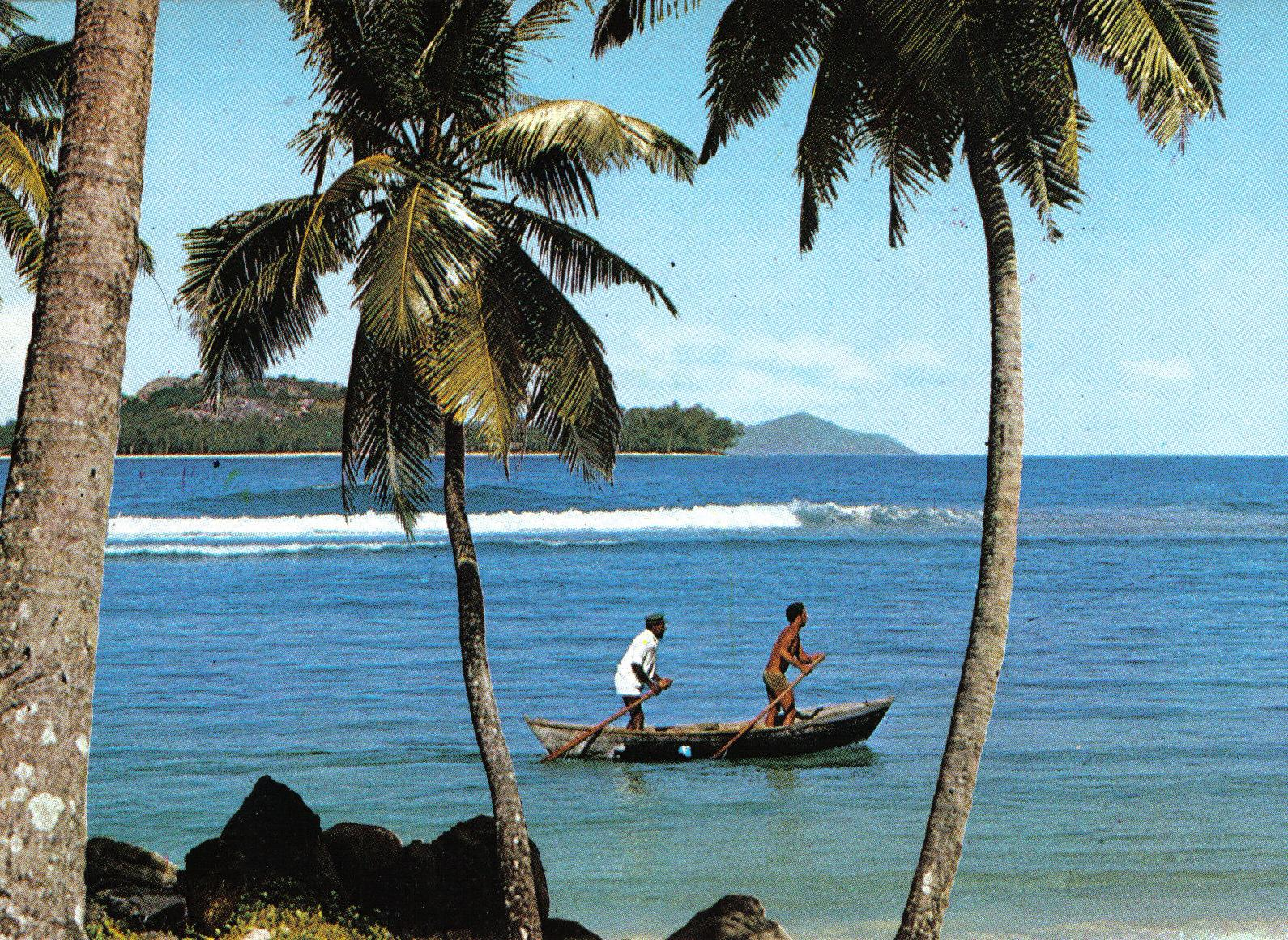
Fishermen pirogue Seychelles

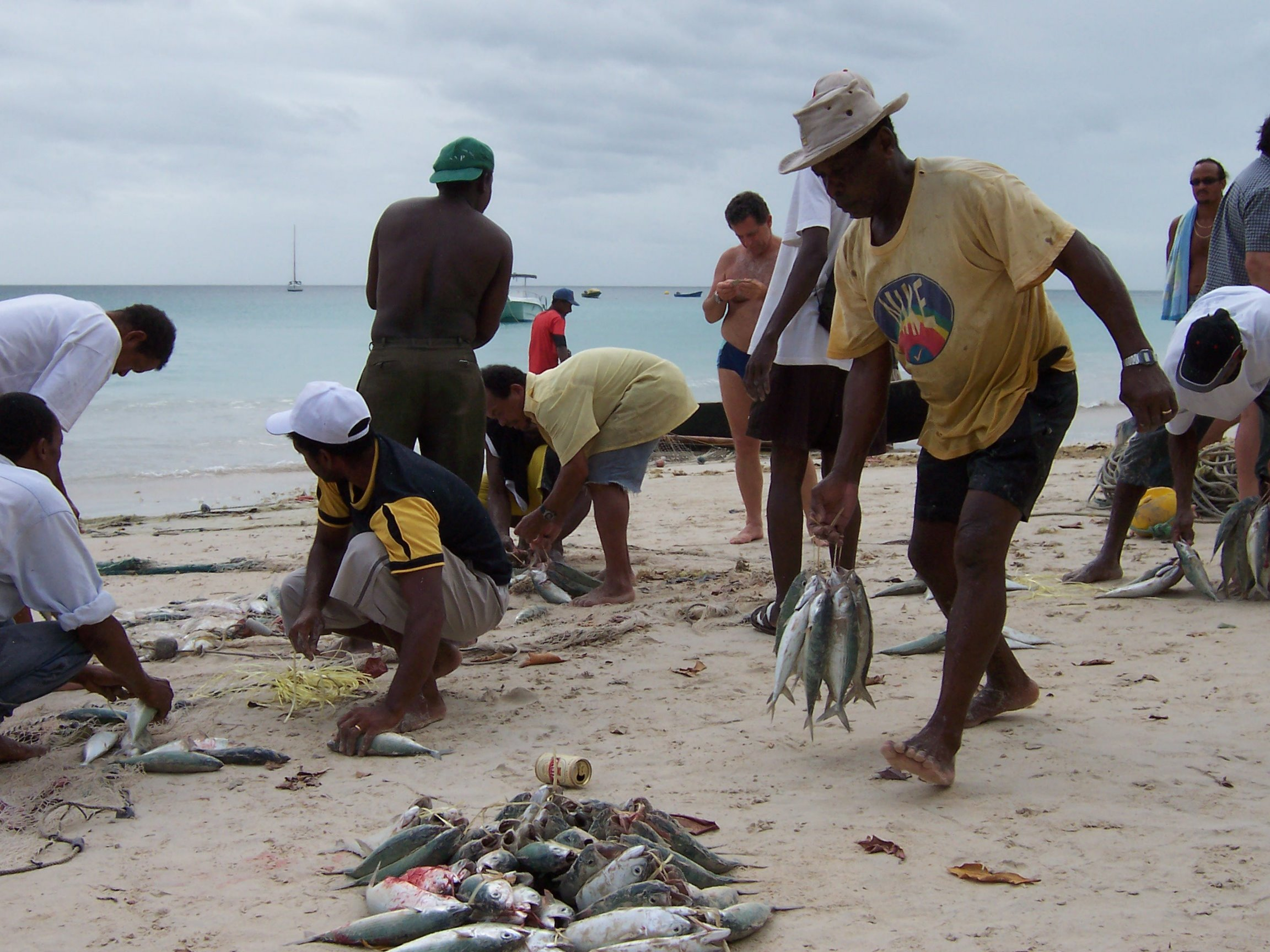
Mahé Beauvallon Fishing on the Beach

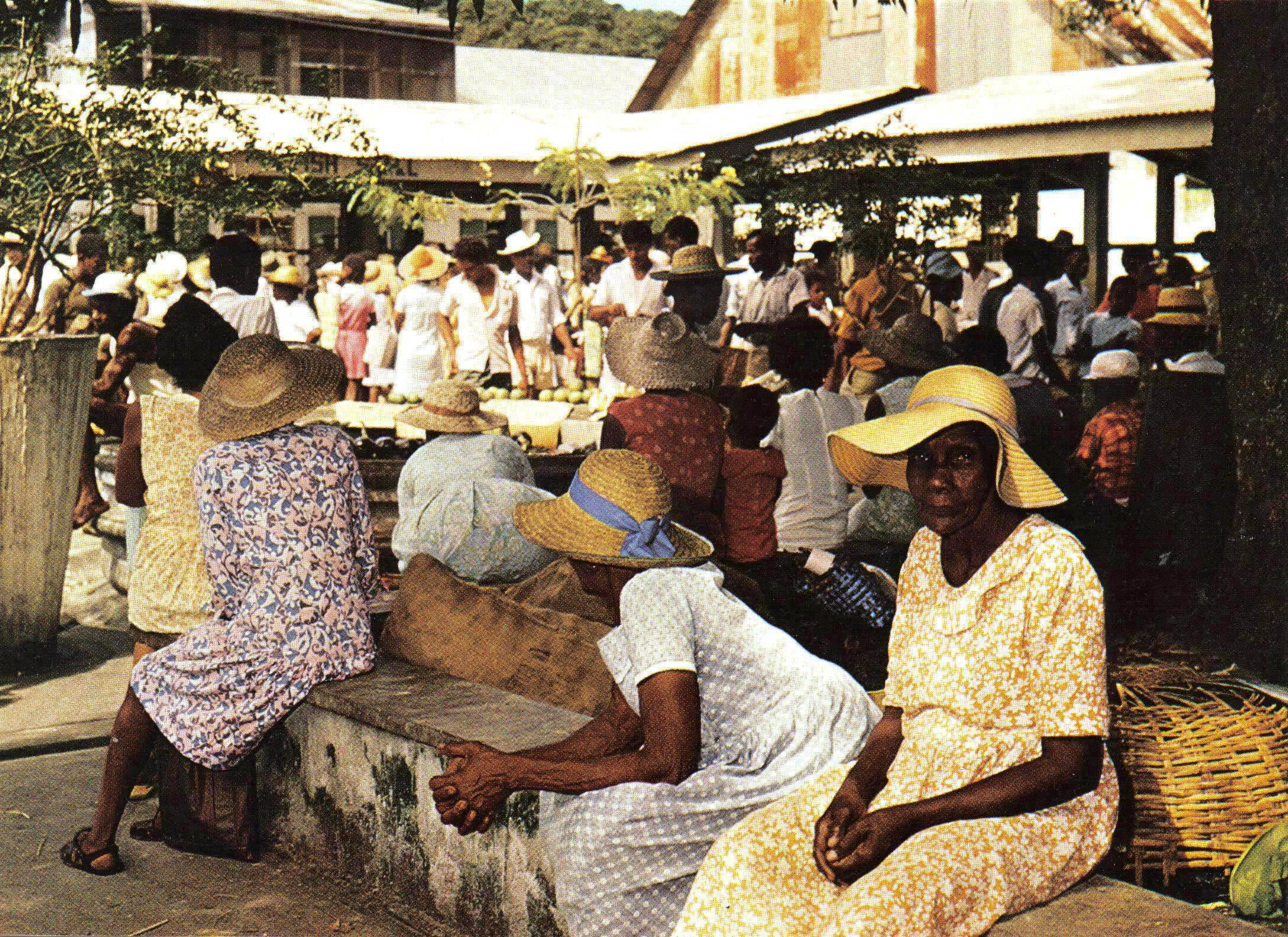
Market scene Seychelles

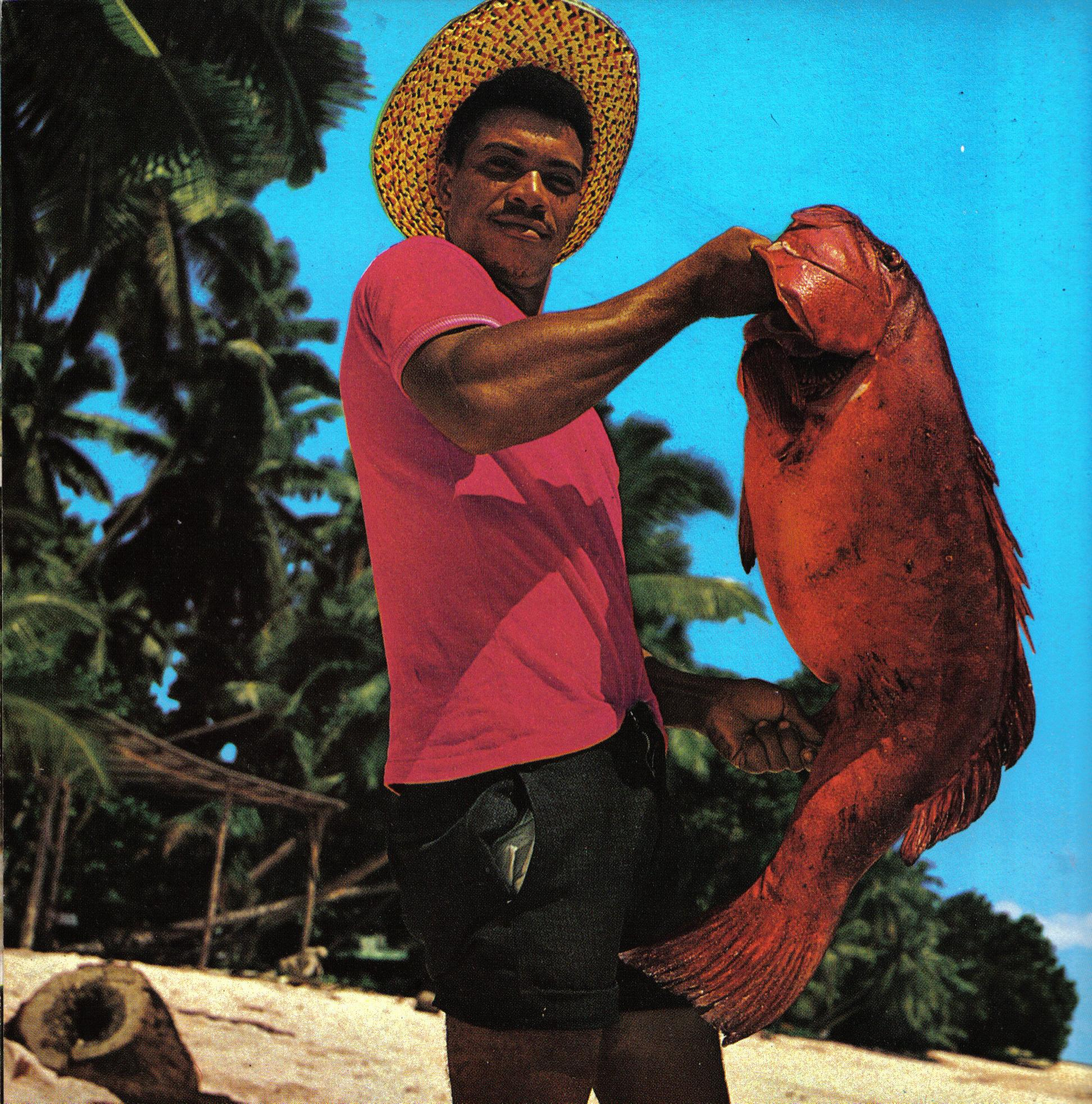
Seychelles man with fish

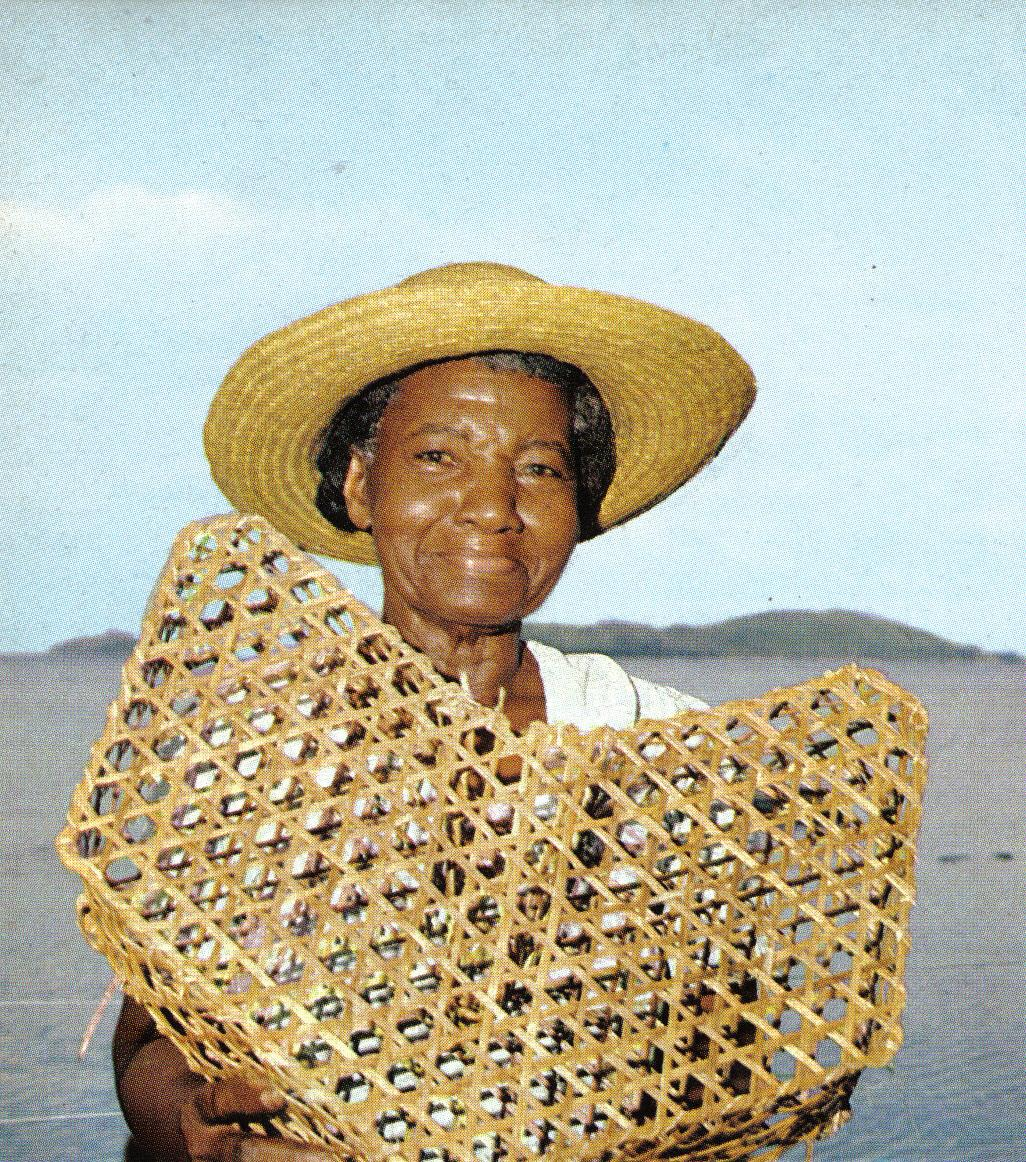
Seychelloise fish trap

== One-party state ==
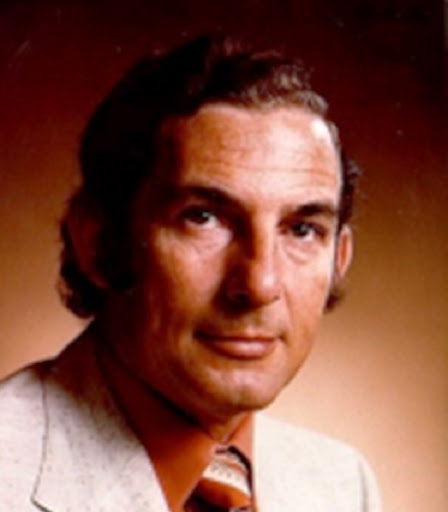
France-Albert René, Seychelles president (1977–2004)

On 5 June 1977, an almost bloodless coup d'état saw Mancham deposed while abroad and France-Albert René became president. The Seychelles became a one-party state from 1979 to 1991, with the SPUP becoming the Seychelles People's Progressive Front (SPPF). René was the only presidential candidate for elections in 1979, in 1984, and in 1989, which he won with over 90% of the vote.

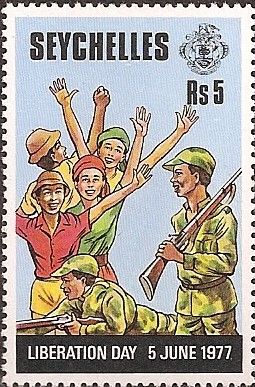
A post stamp commemorating the anniversary of the 1977 coup, called "Liberation Day"

In 1981, the country experienced a failed coup attempt by Mike Hoare and a team of South African-backed mercenaries. The author John Perkins has alleged that this was part of a covert action to re-install the pro-American former president in the face of concerns about United States access to its military bases in Diego Garcia.

The government was threatened again by an army mutiny in August 1982, but it was quelled after 2 days when loyal troops, reinforced by Tanzanian forces and several of the mercenaries that had escaped from the prison, recaptured the rebel-held installations.

Gérard Hoarau, of the exiled opposition, was head of the Mouvement Pour La Resistance (MPR). His opposition to the dictatorship of René was based in London and he was assassinated on 29 November 1985 by an unidentified gunman on the doorstep of his London home. Hoarau is buried in London.

The SPPF instituted a number of reforms, including universal access to education and healthcare, as well as environmental reforms. During this period, the Seychelles developed rapidly, to the point that it became the most developed country in Africa on the Human Development Index. The situation for Seychellois Creole people, who constitute the majority of the nation's population, also improved significantly due to domestic policies implemented by President René aimed at racial equity. However, the white minority (mainly Franco-Seychellois) still occupied most important posts (ministerial and parliamentary) in the state administration and dominated the ranks of the party leadership.

In 1985, after the assassination of Hoarau, the Seychelles community in exile put together a program titled SIROP (Seychelles International Repatriation and Onward Program).

In February 1992, Conrad Greslé, a local accountant, landowner and advocate of multi-party democracy in Seychelles was arrested and charged with treason for allegedly planning to overthrow President René's régime with the apparent aid of foreign mercenaries and with supposed CIA involvement. Greslé died in Seychelles in July 1993 and is survived by his wife Sylvia, son Neville and daughters Natasha and Yvette Greslé.

A number of Seychellois were displaced and exiled by the dictatorship. The Greslé family were one of a few landowners of largely French descent to remain after the coup d'état of 1977 – most had their land confiscated and were exiled. Any individual who publicly resisted the René régime was vulnerable to threats, intimidation, or exile throughout the 1980s. Disappearances and what appear to be politically motivated killing did take place but these are not officially documented or acknowledged. A number of Seychellois families are now calling for official acknowledgement of politically motivated violence subsequent to the 1977 coup.

== Democracy ==
Flag of Seychelles since 1996

Following the dissolution of the Soviet Union, at an Extraordinary Congress of the Seychelles People's Progressive Front (SPPF) on 4 December 1991, President René announced a return to the multiparty system of government after almost 16 years of one-party rule. On 27 December 1991, the Constitution of Seychelles was amended to allow for the registration of political parties. Among the exiles returning to Seychelles was James Mancham, who returned in April 1992 to revive his party, the Democratic Party (DP). By the end of that month, eight political parties had registered to contest the first stage of the transition process: election to the constitutional commission, which took place on 23–26 July 1992.

The constitutional commission was made up of 22 elected members, 14 from the SPPF and 8 from the DP. It commenced work on 27 August 1992, with both President René and Mancham calling for national reconciliation and consensus on a new democratic constitution. A consensus text was agreed upon on 7 May 1993, and a referendum to approve it was called for 15–18 June. The draft was approved with 73.9% of the electorate in favour of it and 24.1% against.

The first multiparty presidential and legislative elections held under the new constitution was held between 23–26 July 1993, as well as a resounding victory for President René. Three political groups contested the elections – the SPPF, the DP, and the United Opposition (UO) – a coalition of three smaller political parties, including Parti Seselwa. Two other smaller opposition parties threw in their lot with the DP. All participating parties and international observer groups accepted the results as "free and fair."

Three candidates contested the 20–22 March 1998 presidential election: France-Albert René of the SPPF, James Mancham of the DP, and Wavel Ramkalawan. President René and his SPPF won by a landslide. The president's popularity in elections jumped to 66.6% in 1998 from 59.5% in 1993, while the SPPF garnered 61.7% of the total votes cast in the 1998 National Assembly election, compared to 56.5% in 1993.

In 1999, Mancham switched to the centrist liberal Seychelles National Party (SNP) which emerged as the major opposition party, losing to the SPPF in 2002 parliamentary election with 42% of the vote. In 2004, René turned the presidency over to his former vice-president and long-time comrade, James Michel. Michel won the 2006 presidential election against SNP leader Ramkalawan with 53.5% of the vote. The former vice-president, Danny Faure, was sworn in as president on 16 October 2016, following the surprise resignation of James Michel.

On 26 October 2020, the opposition took power in the Seychelles for the first time since 1977, following its victory in the presidential election. Anglican priest Wavel Ramkalawan defeated President Danny Faure by 54.9% to 43.5%.

The election of the National Assembly was held on 22–24 October 2020. The Seychelles National Party, the Seychelles Party for Social Justice and Democracy and the Seychelles United Party formed a coalition, Linyon Demokratik Seselwa (LDS). LDS won 25 seats and the former ruling party United Seychelles (US) (Formerly Parti Lepep, Seychelles People's Progressive Front) won 10 seats of the 35 seats of the National Assembly. However, in the 2025 Seychellois general election United Seychelles won 15 out of 26 seats in the parliament.

In October 2025, the presidential runoff was won by former parliamentary speaker and main opposition leader, Patrick Herminie, meaning Herminie's party, United Seychelles (US) returned to power. On 26 October 2025, Patrick Herminie was sworn in as Seychelles’ sixth president.

== See also ==
- History of Africa
- List of colonial governors of Seychelles
- List of presidents of Seychelles
- Vice-President of Seychelles
- Politics of Seychelles
- Prime Minister of Seychelles
