= Languages of Mauritius =

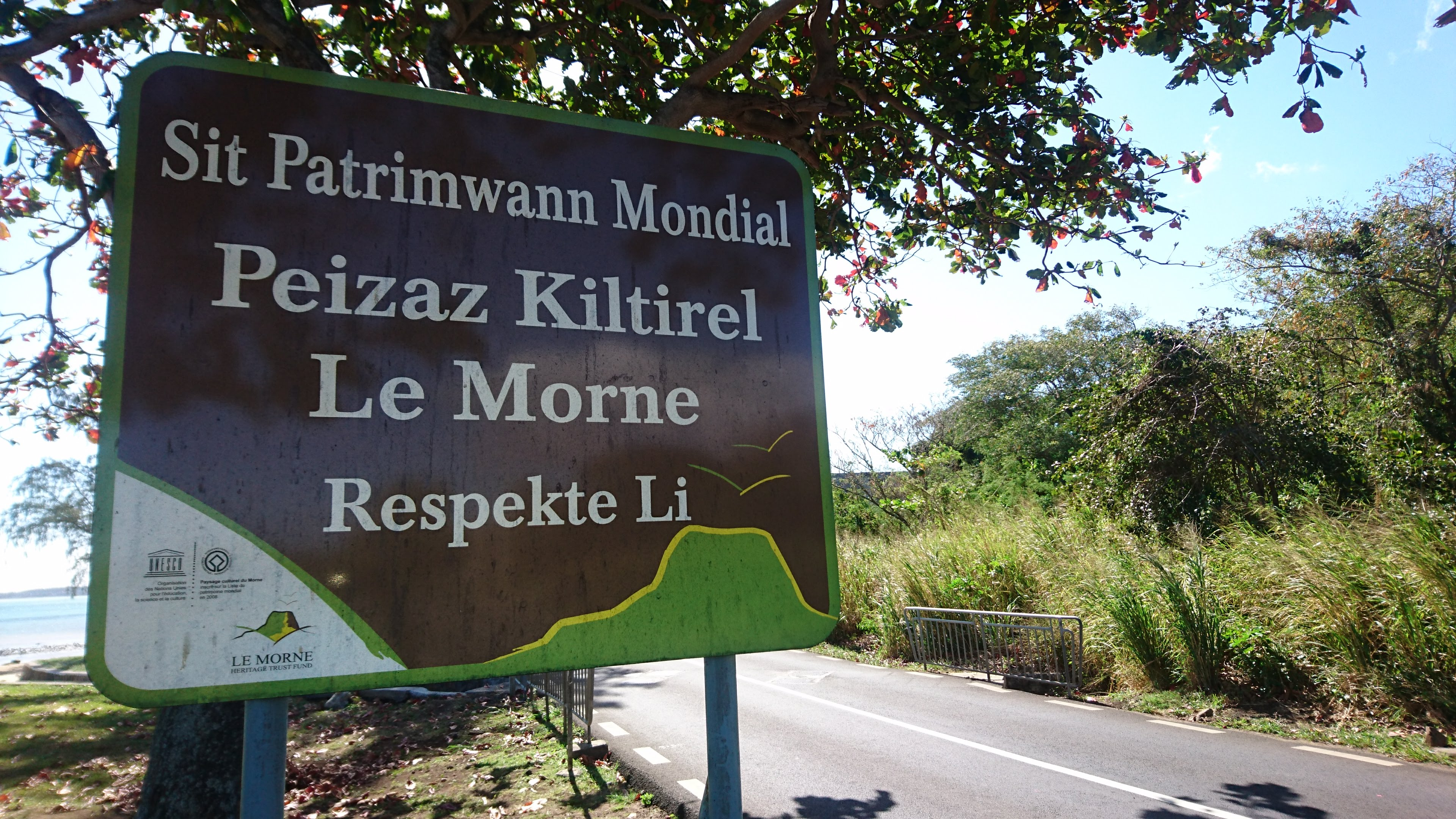
- Sign in Mauritian Creole
- National: Mauritian Creole
- Recognised: French and English
- Minority: Mauritian Bhojpuri, Tamil, Chinese, Telugu, Hindi-Urdu, Marathi
- Signed: Mauritian Sign Language
- Keyboard layout: QWERTY

Home languages in Mauritius as of 2022 Census
Languages	percent
Creole	90.0%
Bhojpuri	5.1%
French	4.4%
English	0.6%

The Constitution of the Republic of Mauritius does not mention any official language. The Constitution contains one statement in Article 49 that states that "the official language of the Assembly shall be English but any member may address the chair in French" which indicate that French and English are official languages of the National Assembly (parliament) only.

While the lingua franca is Mauritian Creole, French is spoken by a majority of Mauritians and is used in the media while English is used in government and education.

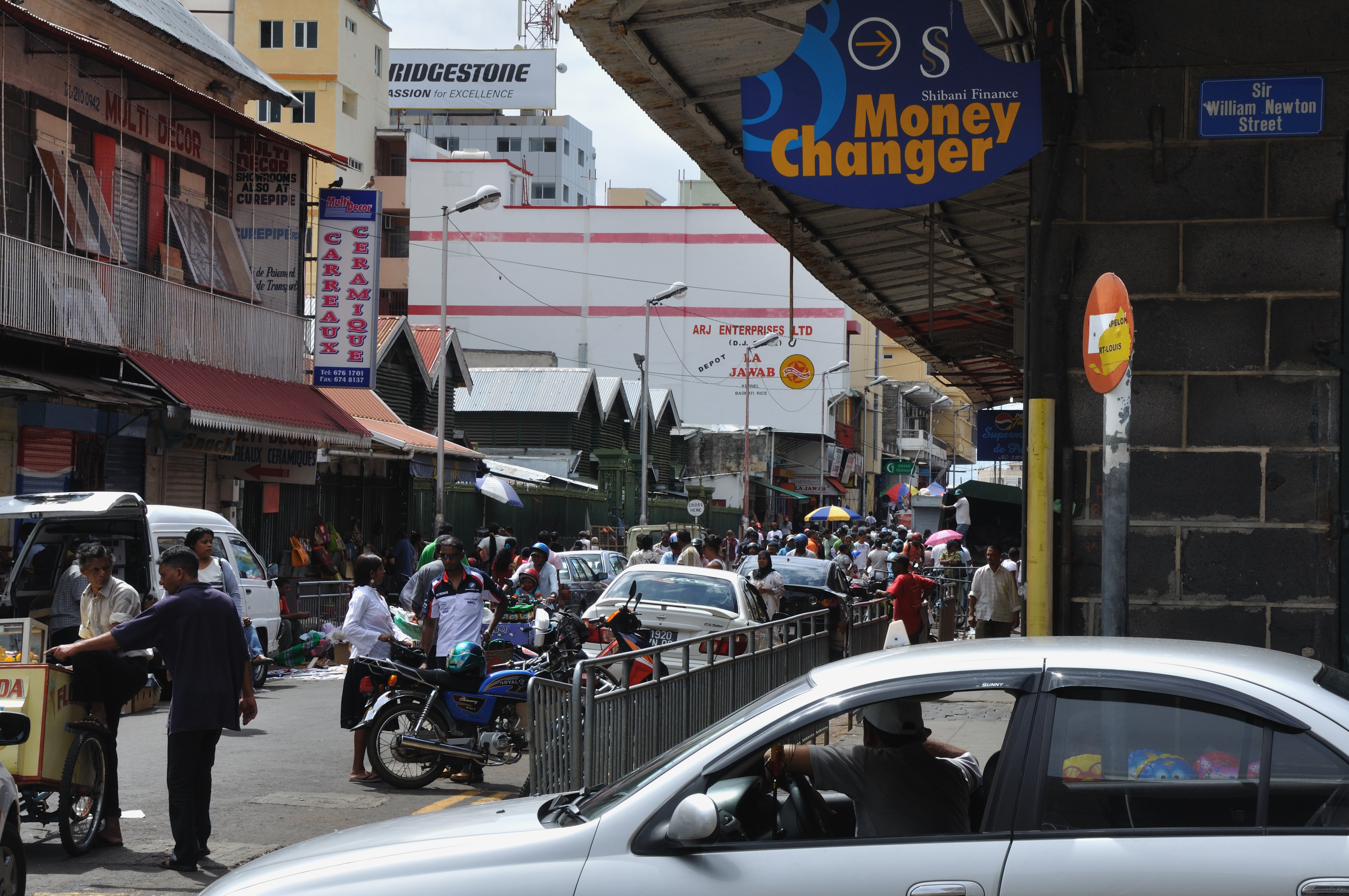
Both French and English are common languages on signages in Mauritius.

English is used as the prime medium of instruction in public schools while French is also a common language in education and the dominant language of media. According to the Organisation internationale de la Francophonie, 72.7% of the Mauritians were French speakers in 2005. Mauritius shares this distinction of being both French- and English-speaking with Canada, Cameroon, Dominica, Rwanda, Seychelles and Vanuatu. Being both a French-speaking and English-speaking nation, Mauritius is a member of both the Commonwealth of Nations and La Francophonie.

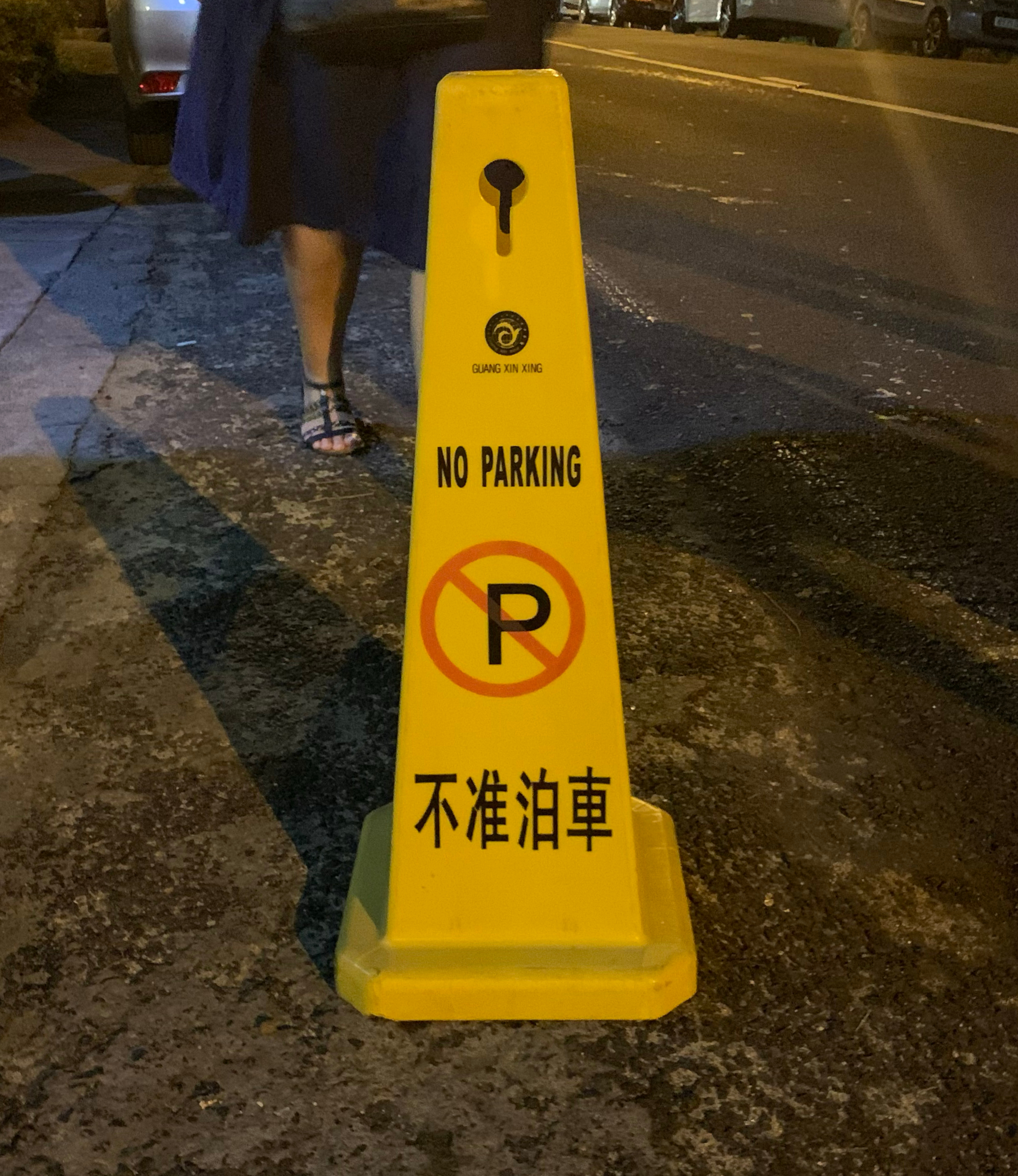
No-Parking traffic cone in English and Chinese, Flic-en-Flac

Other languages spoken in Mauritius mainly include Bhojpuri, Tamil, Telugu, Hindi-Urdu, Marathi and Chinese. The Mauritian Sign Language is the language of the deaf community. Most Mauritians are at least bilingual, if not trilingual or quadrilingual.

== See also ==
- Linguistic variety in Mauritius
- Demographics of Mauritius
- African French
- African English
