= Prime Minister of Seychelles =

Executive position in the government of Seychelles (1970–1977)

Prime Minister of the Seychelles
- Premier Ministre des Seychelles (French)
- Coat of arms of Seychelles
- Appointer: Governor of Seychelles (1970–1976) President of Seychelles (1976–1977)
- Formation: 12 January 1970; 56 years ago
- First holder: Sir James Mancham
- Final holder: France-Albert René
- Abolished: 5 June 1977; 49 years ago

The prime minister of Seychelles was an executive position in the government of Seychelles from 1970 until 1977.

== List of officeholders ==
Political parties

Seychelles Democratic Party (SDP)
Seychelles People's United Party (SPUP)

No.	Portrait	Name (Birth–Death)	Election	Term of office			Political party
No.	Portrait	Name (Birth–Death)	Election	Took office	Left office	Time in office	Political party
Chief Minister of the Crown Colony of Seychelles
1		Sir James Mancham (1939–2017)	1970; 1974	12 November 1970	1 October 1975	4 years, 323 days	SDP
Prime Minister of the Crown Colony of Seychelles
(1)		Sir James Mancham (1939–2017)	—	1 October 1975	28 June 1976 (Note: Become President.)	271 days	SDP
Prime Minister of the Republic of Seychelles
1		France-Albert René (1935–2019)	—	29 June 1976	5 June 1977 (Note: Deposed Mancham in the 1977 coup d'état and become President.)	341 days	SPUP
Post abolished (5 June 1977–present)

== Timeline ==
This is a graphical lifespan timeline of the prime ministers of Seychelles. They are listed in order of first assuming office.

The following chart lists prime ministers by lifespan (living prime ministers on the green line), with the years outside of their premiership in beige.

The following chart shows prime ministers by their age (living prime ministers in green), with the years of their premiership in blue.

== See also ==
- History of Seychelles
- Politics of Seychelles
- List of colonial governors and administrators of Seychelles
- List of presidents of Seychelles
- Vice-President of Seychelles
