= 1970 Seychellois parliamentary election =

- November 1970

All 15 seats in the Legislative Assembly 8 seats needed for a majority
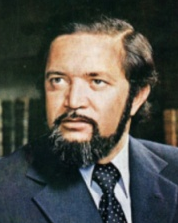

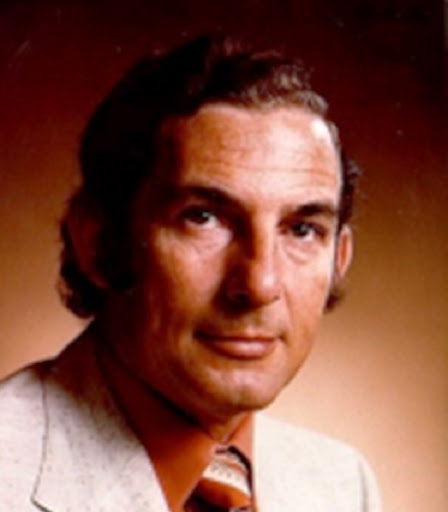
| | First party | Second party |
|---|---|---|
| Leader | James Mancham | France-Albert René |
| Party | Democratic | People's United |
| Last election | 48.94%, 4 seats | 48.16%, 3 seats |
| Seats won | 10 | 5 |
| Seat change | ▲6 | ▲2 |
| Popular vote | 18,972 | 15,834 |
| Percentage | 52.82% | 44.08% |
| Swing | ▲3.88pp | ▼4.09pp |
- Results by constituency
Chief Minister before election
Position established
Elected Chief Minister
James Mancham
Democratic

Parliamentary elections were held in the Seychelles in November 1970. The result was a victory for the Seychelles Democratic Party, which won 10 of the 15 seats.

== Results ==
| Party | Votes | % | Seats | +/– |
|---|---|---|---|---|
| Seychelles Democratic Party | 18,972 | 52.82 | 10 | +6 |
| Seychelles People's United Party | 15,834 | 44.08 | 5 | +2 |
| Liberal Party | 1,082 | 3.01 | 0 | New |
| Seychellois Christian Labour Party | 29 | 0.08 | 0 | New |
| Total | 35,917 | 100.00 | 15 | +7 |
Source: Sternberger et al.
