= Seychelles International Repatriation Onward Program =

Seychelles International Repatriation Onward Program (SIROP) is an exile/refugee return program conceived in 1986/87 by a faction of the Seychelles community in exile, Founder and Leader, Mr Mitchel J Edmond. They supported the return of the Seychelles exile without the use of force or military coup. The concept and programme involved putting together and promoting a strong economic package for the returning exile/refugee and the Seychelles economy amounting to $500 million - $800 million. It also required the return of multi-party politics among other agenda. It was supported by the International community. The other political parties involved were CDU Dr Maxime Ferrari, Mr Andre Uzice, DP Mr David Joubert, SDP & Mouvement Pour la Democracy Sir James Mancham, Alliance Mr Christopher Savy and Mr Lewis Betsey, SNP Mr Philippe Boullé, Seychelles National Party Mr Edmond Camille, Mr Gabriel Houreau, Mr Robert Frichot, Mr Paul Chow, Mr Ralph Volcer, also UKSCA Executives 1987. It also involved then Seychelles Opposition Underground Movements and political parties.

Contrary to what have been stated, the former President of Seychelles, Sir James Mancham had brought about multi-party by using Fax message to incite changes. The Opposition in Seychelles then, - Or that the Commonwealth of Nations brought pressure causing President FA Rene to adopt multi-party elections.

After almost sixteen years of one-party rule, President France-Albert René announced a return to the multiparty system of government at an Extraordinary Congress of the Seychelles People's Progressive Front on 4 December 1991. On 27 December 1991 the Constitution of Seychelles was amended by the Seychelles People's Assembly to allow for the registration of political parties.

The economic concept, impacts, social and political integration for the returning exile, refugee was evaluated by Indian Ocean Interdisciplinary Management Foundation and economists, politicians, executives as officials of World Economic Forum other such bodies in Europe, Asia, Latin America and Africa. Including economic advice from the international Christian communities. European Council on Refugees and Exiles, international refugee and exile organisations, migrant organisations, United Nations relevant bodies. Diplomatic communities in EU, European governments and relevant national institutions. Aspects of relevant EU institutions. Indian Ocean communities in Europe, refugee and exile organisations in Europe. Research carried out at International Institute for Strategic Studies, Chatham House also known as Royal Institute of International Affairs, the Runnymede Trust. Support from European political parties, their international bloc. European and International Trade Union. The Francophonie and the Commonwealth of Nations.

== Seychelles Arbitration Tribunal ==
Seychelles has begun to move to an environment where there is an unparalleled support for arbitration. Already a commercial list court has been set up by the Judiciary. The Bar Association believes that on the legislative front there is a need for very significant legislature reform of the Seychelles arbitration law and rules.

Seychelles Arbitration Law - International Arbitration

The Judiciary of Seychelles Annual report 2013

Correspondence, and application to the Seychelles Supreme Court -Palais de Justice to intervene, study the plaint, issues of that 1986/87 SIROP program we had addressed the Court. Chief Justice Chief Justice Egonda-Ntende recommendation.

== Committee on Truth, Reconciliation and National Unity ==
Among its objectives the committee would:

- Study different tools and methodology adopted by other countries to come up with a model suitable for Seychelles;

- Propose a structure to government which would study and analyse complaints by individuals affected with the aim of shedding light on those events which have taken place in the recent history of our country and that once and for all the truth will come out and those affected will find a solution and peace and closure to their suffering to allow the country to move forward with confidence in the future;

- Make recommendations on policies which would be adopted and action that could be taken to reduce political division in the country for national unity to foster.Committee on Truth, Reconciliation and National Unity

== Truth, Reconciliation and National Unity Commission ==
The mandate of the Commission is to investigate complaints of alleged human rights violations committed in relation to the 1977 coup. The purpose is to establish the truth about alleged violations, to try and bridge divisions caused by such violations, to recommend compensation and reparations to victims, and to determine whether to grant amnesty to perpetrators. The ultimate aim is to bring closure to victims and perpetrators and to unite the people of the Seychelles around a common agenda going forward. Basically, it's about reconciling people through acknowledging and accepting responsibility for the past.
