= 1963 Seychellois parliamentary election =

Parliamentary elections were held in the Seychelles between 12 and 14 August 1963 for the Legislative Council of Seychelles

== Campaign ==
For the first time, the Seychelles Taxpayers and Producers Association was challenged by another party, the Seychelles Islanders United Party.

== Results ==
A total of 2,187 voters participated in the elections.
