= Seychelles Sign Language =

Deaf sign language of the Seychelles

- Lalang Siny Seselwa
- Native to: Seychelles
- Native speakers: 100 (2021)
- Language family: unclear

Language codes
- ISO 639-3: lsw
- Glottolog: seyc1234

Seychelles Sign Language, also known as Lalang Siny Seselwa, is a sign language used by deaf and hard of hearing Seychellois Creole people. Formalization of the language began as an effort in 2008 between representatives of the Seychellois Association for People with Hearing Impairment and the Paris-based Institut National de Jeunes Sourds de Paris. In 2011, the Seychelles government, with support from UNESCO, began work on a standardization project for the language, which culminated in 2019 the first dictionary of Seychelles Sign. The language shows influence from French, American, and Mauritian Sign Language.
