= 2002 Seychellois parliamentary election =

Parliamentary elections were held in Seychelles on 6 December 2002. The result was a victory for the ruling Seychelles People's Progressive Front, which won 18 of the 25 constituency seats and five of the nine proportional representation seats.

== Results ==
| Party | Votes | % | Seats | | | |
| Party | Votes | % | FPTP | PR | Total | +/– |
|---|---|---|---|---|---|---|
| Seychelles People's Progressive Front | 28,075 | 54.27 | 18 | 5 | 23 | –7 |
| Seychelles National Party | 22,030 | 42.59 | 7 | 4 | 11 | +8 |
| Seychelles Democratic Party | 1,605 | 3.10 | 0 | 0 | 0 | –1 |
| Social Democratic Alliance | 16 | 0.03 | 0 | 0 | 0 | New |
| Independents | 4 | 0.01 | 0 | 0 | 0 | 0 |
| Total | 51,730 | 100.00 | 25 | 9 | 34 | 0 |
| Valid votes | 51,730 | 98.16 | | | | |
| Invalid/blank votes | 969 | 1.84 | | | | |
| Total votes | 52,699 | 100.00 | | | | |
| Registered voters/turnout | 62,350 | 84.52 | | | | |
Source: EISA
