= Mauritian Sign Language =

Deaf sign language of Mauritius

- Native to: Mauritius
- Native speakers: 1,000 (2021 DBS/DOOR/SIL)
- Language family: Language isolate

Language codes
- ISO 639-3: lsy
- Glottolog: maur1240

Mauritian Sign Language (MSL; French: Langue des signes mauricienne or mauritienne) is the indigenous deaf sign language of Mauritius.

== Bibliography ==
- Adone, Dany & Gebert, A. (2006). A dictionary and grammar for Mauritian Sign Language. Volume 1. Editions Le Printemps Ltée, Vacoas, République de Maurice.
