= James Mancham =

President of Seychelles

Sir James Mancham KBE
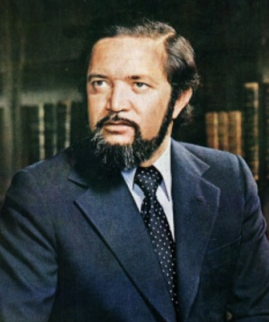
- Official portrait, 1976

1st President of Seychelles
- In office 29 June 1976 – 5 June 1977
- Prime Minister: France-Albert René
- Preceded by: Office established
- Succeeded by: France-Albert René

1st Prime Minister of Seychelles
- In office 1 October 1975 – 28 June 1976
- Preceded by: Office established
- Succeeded by: France-Albert René

Chief Minister of the Crown Colony of Seychelles
- In office 12 November 1970 – 1 October 1975
- Preceded by: Office established
- Succeeded by: Office abolished

Personal details
- Born: James Richard Marie Mancham; 11 August 1939 Victoria, British Seychelles
- Died: 8 January 2017 (aged 77) Glacis, Seychelles
- Party: Seychelles Democratic Party
- Spouses: Heather Jean Evans (m. 1963; div. 1974) Catherine Olsen (m. 1985)
- Children: 3
- Profession: Lawyer; politician; writer

Sir James Richard Marie Mancham KBE (11 August 1939 – 8 January 2017) was a Seychellois politician who founded the Seychelles Democratic Party and was the first President of Seychelles from 1976 to 1977.

== Political career ==
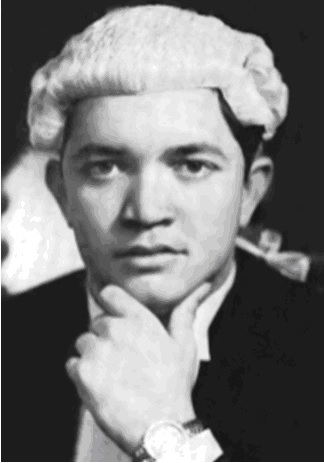
James Mancham in 1961

James's father, Richard Mancham, a successful businessman, sent James to law school in England. When Britain announced its intention to give independence to the colony, Mancham founded the Democratic Party (S.D.P.), and served as its leader until February 2005. France-Albert René founded an opposition party, the Seychelles People's United Party (S.P.U.P) with the support of the Soviet Union. As Chief Minister of the colony, Mancham promoted tourism to the Seychelles and arranged for the building of the airport that was to make the Seychelles accessible to the rest of the world. Tourism increased and the economy developed. In 1976, he won the popular vote when the British gave the Seychelles independence. Less than a year later, in June 1977, he was deposed in a coup by Prime Minister France-Albert René, who had the support of Tanzanian-trained revolutionaries and Tanzanian-supplied weapons, while Mancham was attending the 1977 Commonwealth Heads of Government Meeting in London.

Mancham lived in exile in London until April 1992. During this period, he was financially successful in several international business ventures and married Catherine Olsen, an Australian journalist working in London. When he returned to the Seychelles following the lifting of the ban on opposition, he resumed the promotion of tourism to the tropical islands.

He ran for president in July 1993 and finished second behind René with 36.72% of the vote. He was elected Leader of the Opposition from July 1993 to 1998. In March 1998, he ran again, receiving third place and 13.8% of the vote, behind René and Wavel Ramkalawan.

== Personal life and death ==
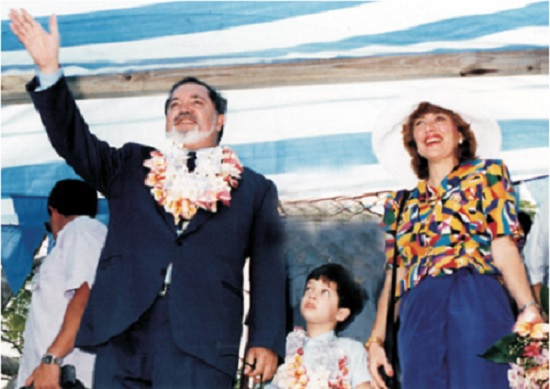
James Mancham in 1992

Mancham was born into a wealthy family, the eldest son of Richard and Evelyn (née Tirant) Mancham. He had Chinese ancestry through his father and French ancestry through his mother.

He married Heather Jean Evans in 1963 and the marriage was dissolved in 1974. One daughter named Caroline and one son named Richard were born from the union. In 1985, he married Australian journalist Catherine Olsen and had one son named Alexander.

Mancham died suddenly on 8 January 2017 of a possible stroke at age 77. He was buried in the State House cemetery next to Seychelles' last French Administrator, Jean-Baptiste Quéau de Quincy.

== Other activity ==
Mancham was the author of a number of books, including Paradise Raped about the June 1977 coup d'état in the Seychelles, War on America: Seen from the Indian Ocean, written after the 11 September 2001 attacks on the United States, his autobiography; Seychelles Global Citizen: The Autobiography of the Founding President, in 2009,; and Seychelles: The Saga of a Small Nation Navigating the Cross-Currents of a Big World, in 2015. Mancham also served on the advisory board of International Journal on World Peace and was a member of the World Future Council.

== Awards and honours ==
Knight Commander of the Order of the British Empire.

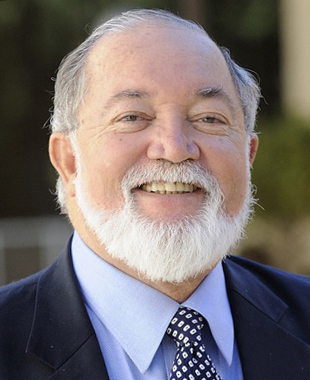
Mancham in 2014

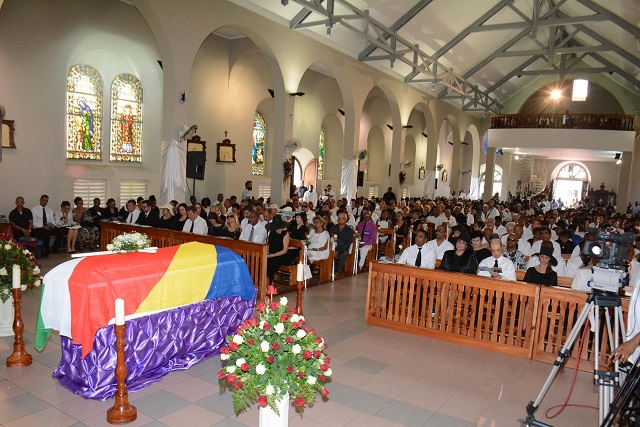
Memorial service in Immaculate Conception Cathedral, Victoria

Mancham received the 2010 International Jurist Award at the inauguration of the International Conference of Jurists at the Vigyan Bhawan, New Delhi, India. Under the theme International Terrorism, the event was jointly organised by the International Council of Jurists, the National Human Rights Commission of India, the All India Bar Association and Indian Council of Jurists. In a welcoming speech, Dr. Adish Aggarwala, President of the International Council of Jurists and Chairman of All India Bar Association, said the award for Mancham was to recognise his role in promoting world peace and the pivotal part he played in helping to settle international disputes.

Mancham was also one of the recipients of the Gusi Peace Prize in 2011.

Political offices
Preceded by post created	Prime Minister of Seychelles; 1970–1976	Succeeded by France-Albert René
Preceded by post created	President of Seychelles; 1976–1977	Succeeded by France-Albert René
