= Kyte (surname) =

- Language: English

Origin
- Meaning: Kite (bird); Cottage

Other names
- Variant forms: Kite, Keit, Keyte, Keet, Keat, Keate, Kett, Kight, Keates

Kyte is an English surname.

== Origins ==
Kyte is a variant spelling of Kite, which originated both as a nickname from the bird (Middle English kete or kyte), and as a toponymic surname from various places with names derived from Old English cyte 'cottage'.

== Statistics ==
The 1881 United Kingdom census found 509 people with the surname Kyte, throughout western and southern England. Statistics compiled by Patrick Hanks on the basis of the 2011 United Kingdom census and 2011 Irish census found 1,256 people on the island of Great Britain and 10 on the island of Ireland with this surname. The 2010 United States census found 1,230 people with this surname, making it the 21,307th-most-common name in the country, compared with 1,198 people (20,565th-most-common) in the 2000 Census. In both censuses, roughly nine-tenths of the bearers of the surname identified as non-Hispanic white.

== People ==
- Alun Kyte (born 1964), English murderer
- Ambrose Kyte (c. 1822–1868). Australian merchant and politician
- Andrew Kyte (born 1966), senior Royal Navy officer
- Darryl Kyte, Canadian lawyer
- Francis Kyte (fl. 1710–1744), English engraver and portrait painter
- George William Kyte (1864–1940), Canadian politician
- Jim Kyte (born 1964), Canadian ice hockey player
- Rachel Kyte (born 1965), British academic
- Sydney Kyte (1896–1981), British bandleader
- Tyler Kyte (born 1984), Canadian actor and musician

== See also ==
- KYTE (disambiguation)
