= Keate =

Keate is an English surname. Notable people with the surname include:

- John Keate (1773–1852), English schoolmaster
- Robert Keate (1777–1857), British surgeon
- Robert William Keate (1814–1873), English cricketer and British colonial administrator
