= Archibald Dalzel =

British doctor, slave trader and colonial administrator (1740–1818)

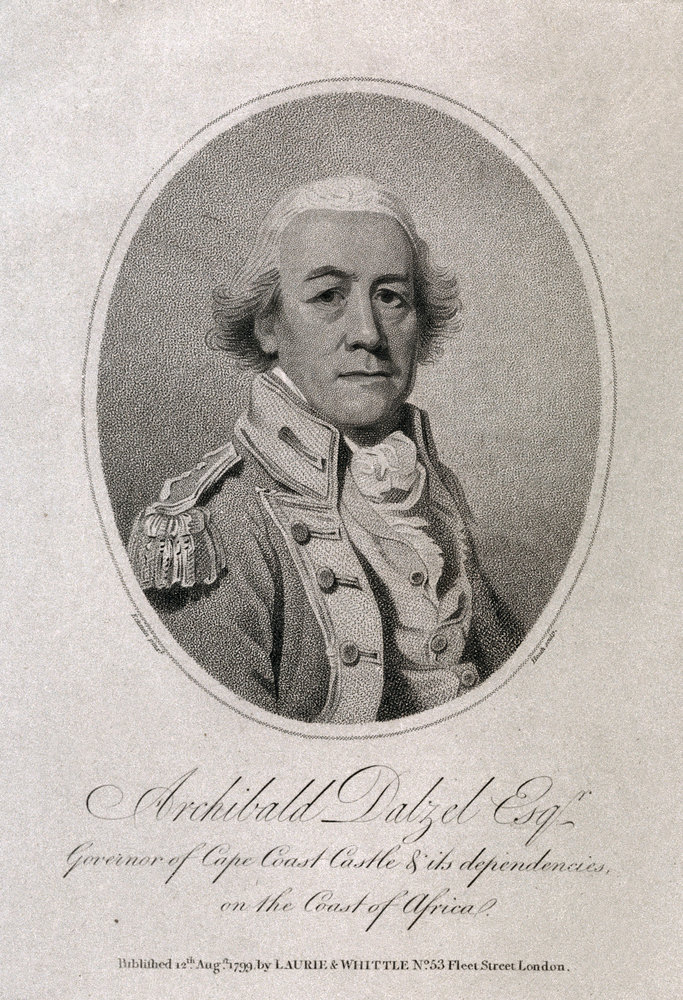
1799 portrait of Dalzel by John Eckstein

Archibald Dalzel (c. 1740–1818) was a British doctor, slave trader and colonial administrator who served as governor of the Committee of Merchants of the Gold Coast from 1792 to 1802. Between 1804 and 1808, he owned two slave ships. Dalzel died in 1818.

== Life ==
Archibald Dalzel was born c. 1740 in Kirkliston, the son of a local carpenter named William and his wife Alice. Dalzel trained to be a doctor in Edinburgh and served as a naval surgeon in the Royal Navy before decided to work in West Africa for financial reasons. In 1763 he went to West Africa in the employ of the African Company of Merchants to work as a surgeon but started trading slaves to add to his salary. Dalzel served for four years as governor of Whydah. He observed that the people at Whydah "pay a kind of veneration to a particular species of large snake, which is very gentle." Dalzal returned to England in 1770.

In 1775 Dalzel purchased the 60-ton schooner Nancy and on 19 September he returned to West Africa onboard her. At some point Dalzel purchased the ship Hannah to act as a ship's tender for Nancy. On 31 March 1792 Dalzel began serving as governor of the Committee of Merchants of the Gold Coast after having been appointed by the African Company of Merchants's African Committee which was then in charge of British trading posts in the Gold Coast region. Based out of the Cape Coast Castle, Dalzel served as governor until 16 December 1798 but began serving a second stint in the office on 28 April 1800 until being replaced again on 30 September 1802.

While serving as governor Dalzel had a daughter named Elizabeth in c. 1793; her mother is unknown but a later source presumed she was a white "wench". In the same year of Elizabeth's birth Dalzel published The History of Dahomy, a proslavery history of Dahomey which defended the Atlantic slave trade. In 1804 Dalzel purchased the slave ship Thames. She made two slave-trading voyages while under his ownership, delivering 486 captives to the West Indies. In 1805 Dalzel purchased a second slave ship, Chalmers, which made one complete slave-trading voyage under his ownership. Following the passage of the Slave Trade Act 1807, which banned British participation in the Atlantic slave trade, Dalzel sold Thames. Chalmers was wrecked in 1808 on her (by now illegal) second slave-trading voyage; her crew and enslaved captives were saved. Dalzel died in Britain in c. 1818.

Government offices
Preceded by John Gordon	Governor of the Committee of Merchants of the Gold Coast; 31 March 1792 – 16 December 1798	Succeeded by Jacob Mould
Preceded by John Gordon	Governor of the Committee of Merchants of the Gold Coast; 28 April 1800 – 30 September 1802	Succeeded by Jacob Mould
