= Governor Bannerman =

Governor Bannerman may refer to:

- Alexander Bannerman (1788–1864), Governor of Prince Edward Island from 1851 to 1854, Governor of the Bahamas from 1854 to 1857, and Governor of Newfoundland from 1857 to 1864
- James Bannerman (1790–1858), Acting Governor of the Gold Coast from 1850 to 1851
- John Alexander Bannerman (1759–1819), Governor of Prince of Wales' Island and Province Wellesley in 1817
