= Thames (1790 ship) =

History

Great Britain
- Name: Thames
- Builder: Southampton
- Launched: 1790
- Captured: 17 July 1811
- Fate: Burnt 17 July 1811

General characteristics
- Tons burthen: 221, or 222, or 225, on 232 (bm)
- Complement: 25
- Armament: 1798: 8 × 6-pounder + 4 × 4-pounder guns + 6 × 12-pounder carronades; 1806: 16 × 6-pounder guns; 1810: 16 × 6&4-pounder guns

Thames was launched at Southampton in 1790. Until 1798 she sailed across the Atlantic, trading primarily with The Bahamas. She then became a slave ship in the triangular trade in enslaved people. She made seven voyages transporting enslaved people. After the abolition of the British slave trade in 1807, Thames returned to trading with the West Indies. A French privateer captured Thames on 17 July 1811 and burnt her.

== Career ==
Thames first appeared in Lloyd's Register in 1791.

Year	Master	Owner	Trade	Source
1791	Selby	Hamilton	London–"Caron"	LR
1792	Selby; Gillespie	Hamilton; Captain & Co.	London–"Caron"; London–New Providence	LR
1798	Falconer; A.Chester	J.Gillespy; Shoolbred	London–Jamaica	LR
1799	A.Chester	Shoolbred	London–Africa	LR

1st voyage transporting enslaved people (1798–1799): Captain Andrew Chester sailed from London on 3 November 1798. In 1798, 180 vessels sailed from English ports, bound to Africa to acquire and transport enslaved people. Eight of these vessels sailed from London.

Thames acquired captives at Cape Coast Castle. She arrived at St Vincent on 25 April 1799 with 338 captives, that she sold there. She arrived back at Dover from St Kitts in September.

2nd voyage transporting enslaved people (1800–1801): Captain Chester sailed from London on 11 January 1800. In 1800, 133 vessels sailed from English ports, bound to Africa to acquire and transport enslaved people. Ten of these vessels sailed from London.

Thames acquired captives on the Gold Coast and then primarily at Whydah. She arrived at Demerara on 16 January 1801 with 213 captives.

Year	Master	Owner	Trade	Source
1801	Chester; G.Black	Shoolbred; Milles	London–Africa	LR

3rd voyage transporting enslaved people (1801–1802): Captain George Black sailed from London on 8 June 1801. In 1801, 147 vessels sailed from English ports, bound to Africa to acquire and transport enslaved people; 23 of these vessels sailed from London.

Thames acquired captives on the Gold Coast. She arrived in the West Indies in December, delivering captives first at St Vincent and then arriving with 80 captives at Tobago. She arrived back at London on 13 April 1802.

4th voyage transporting enslaved people (1802–1803): Captain Black sailed from London on 27 June 1802. In 1802, 155 vessels sailed from English ports, bound to Africa to acquire and transport enslaved people; 30 of these vessels sailed from London.

Thames acquired captives on the Gold Coast. She arrived at Trinidad on 1 March 1803 with 236 captives. She returned to London on 20 April 1803.

5th voyage transporting enslaved people (1803–1804): Captain Black sailed from London on 5 August 1803 and Portsmouth on 25 August. In 1803, 99 vessels sailed from English ports, bound to Africa to acquire and transport enslaved people; 15 of these vessels sailed from London.

Thames began acquiring captives at Gold Coast Castle on 9 December. She also acquired captives at Accra. She stopped at Barbados and arrived at Suriname on 11 May 1804 with 244 captives. She sailed for London on 13 July and arrived at London on 26 September.

In 1804 the slave trader Archibald Dalzel acquired Thames. (Note: Dalzel was a Scottish colonial administrator and slave trader who served as governor of the Gold Coast from 1792 to 1802.)

6th voyage transporting enslaved people (1805–1806): Captain Black sailed from London on 10 January 1805. On 7 March she was at Madeira. Thames acquired captives at Cape Coast Castle and Accra from 4 April. She arrived at Suriname on 2 October with 249 captives. Thames, David Glegg, master, sailed for London on 29 October (or 5 November) and arrived at Cork on 17 April, and London on 16 June 1806.

Year	Master	Owner	Trade	Source & notes
1807	R.Hall	R.Dalziel	London−Africa	LR; damages repaired 1806

7th voyage transporting enslaved people (1806–1808): Captain R. Hall sailed from London on 2 October 1806.

Thames acquired captives at Bane Island. She arrived at Trinidad on 25 July 1807 with 173 captives. Her master was now C. Anderson. She arrived back at London, with Adamson, master, on 25 May 1808.

The Slave Trade Act 1807 ended British participation in the trade in enslaved people. New owners returned Thames to the West Indies trade. Miller & Co. purchased Thames from Dalzel in order to sail her as a West Indiaman between London and Grenada.

Year	Master	Owner	Trade	Source & notes
1809	Clark	Miller & Co.	London–Grenada	LR; damages repaired 1806

Captain Joseph Clark acquired a letter of marque on 25 January 1810.

Year	Master	Owner	Trade	Source & notes
1809	Clark	Miller & Co.	London–Grenada	LR; damages repaired 1806 & small repairs 1808

== Fate ==
Lloyd's List reported that the privateer Duc de Dantzig, of 14 guns (18-pounder carronades) and 128 men, of Nantes, had captured Thames, J. Clark, master, on 17 July 1810, and Lady Penrhyn, Burgess, master on 22 July. Thames had been sailing from London to St Vincent's, and Lady Penrhyn from London to Grenada. Both vessels were in ballast, and Duc de Danzig burnt them after taking off the people on board them. She then captured the schooner Ann, which had set out from Barbados to Demerara. Duc de Dantzig put her prisoners aboard Ann and let her proceed; Ann arrived at Barbados on 26 July.
