= Robert William Keate =

British colonial governor

Commissioner of the Seychelles
- In office 1850–1852
- Preceded by: Charles Augustus Etienne Mylius
- Succeeded by: Charles William Bhering, Viscount Bhering

17th (British) Governor of Trinidad
- In office 26 January 1857 – 1864
- Preceded by: B. Brooks
- Succeeded by: John Henry Thomas Manners-Sutton

8th Lieutenant-Governor of the Colony of Natal
- In office 1867–1872
- Preceded by: John Bisset
- Succeeded by: Anthony Musgrave

Governor of the Gold Coast
- In office 7 March 1873 – 17 March 1873
- Monarch: Victoria
- Preceded by: Charles Spencer Salmon
- Succeeded by: Robert William Harley

Personal details
- Born: 16 June 1814 Westminster, London, UK, UK
- Died: 17 March 1873 (aged 58) Cape Coast Castle, Gold Coast
- Spouse: Thando Keate
- Relations: Robert Keate (father), John Keate (great-uncle)
- Education: Eton College, Christ Church, Oxford

Robert William Keate
Domestic team information
- Years: Team
- 1834–1837: Oxford University
- 1835–1848: Marylebone Cricket Club

Robert William Keate (16 June 1814 – 17 March 1873) was a career British colonial governor, serving as Commissioner of the Seychelles from 1850 to 1852, Governor of Trinidad from 1857 to 1864, Lieutenant-governor of the Colony of Natal from 1867 to 1872, and Governor of Gold Coast from 7 March 1873 to 17 March 1873.

== Early life and family ==
Keate was born in 1814 in Westminster, London, the second son and one of four children of Robert Keate, the brother of John Keate. His older brother Charles died soon after leaving school. Keate was educated at Eton College and later Christ Church, Oxford. He played some cricket at school, playing at Lord's in his final year against Winchester College and in the annual Eton v Harrow match. He graduated in 1836 and was awarded his master's degree in 1842 before being called to the bar at Lincoln's Inn in 1844.

== Cricket career ==
Keate made his debut for the Gentlemen in the 1832 Gentlemen v Players fixture before going up to Oxford later in the year. At university he played three matches for the university and in 1835 played the first of 21 matches for Marylebone Cricket Club (MCC). He also played for the Gentlemen of Kent, a Fast Bowlers team, the Gentlemen of England, Hampshire, and an England Eleven against Kent in 1840.

== Colonial service ==
=== Commissioner of the Seychelles ===
In 1850, Keate was appointed as the Commissioner of the Seychelles. This was a position he held from 1850 to 1852.

=== Governor of Trinidad ===
Keate later joined the colonial civil service upon, and was sent to the West Indies in 1857 as Governor of Trinidad, a position he held from 26 January 1857 to 1864.

=== Lieutenant-governor of Natal ===
In 1867, Keate was appointed the Lieutenant-governor of the Colony of Natal, a position he held from 1867 to 1872.

=== Governor of Cape Coast ===
In 1872, Keate was appointed the Governor of the Gold Coast from 7 March 1873 to 17 March 1873. Keate died at Cape Coast Castle in the Gold Coast on 17 March 1873, just ten days into his Governorship.

Government offices
Preceded by Charles Augustus Etienne Mylius	Commissioner of the Seychelles; 1850–1852	Succeeded by George Thompson Wade
Preceded by B. Brooks	Governor of Trinidad; 1857–1864	Succeeded by Sir John Henry Thomas Manners-Sutton
Preceded by John Bisset	Lieutenant-governor of the Colony of Natal; 1867–1872	Succeeded by Sir Anthony Musgrave
Preceded by Charles Spencer Salmon	Governor of the Gold Coast; 1873	Succeeded by Robert William Harley
