= Elizabeth Dickson =

British abolitionist (1793–1862)

- Born: Elizabeth Dalzel; 1793; Gold Coast
- Died: 30 April 1862 (aged 68–69); Tripoli, Libya
- Spouse: John Dickson

Elizabeth Dickson (born Elizabeth Dalzel; c. 1793 – 30 April 1862) was a British abolitionist who spent her life campaigning on behalf of white slaves who were enslaved by the Barbary slave trade.

== Life ==
Elizabeth Dalzel was born in Gold Coast in c. 1793. Her father, Archibald Dalzel, was a Scotsman who was then serving as governor of the Committee of Merchants of the Gold Coast, having first arrived in West Africa in 1763 as a surgeon. One later source presumes Elizabeth's mother to have been "a [white] wench". Archibald was a slave trader and purchased two slave ships in 1804 and 1805 respectively.

Elizabeth was sent to visit her brother Edward in Algiers. She was a teenager but her brother was an agent and consul for the Portuguese government. She was alarmed to hear of the white slaves enslaved by Barbary corsairs as part of the Barbary slave trade. The pirates there had Christian prisoners from Spain, France, Portugal and Britain. Together with those at Tripoli and Tunis there were thousands of captive slaves. Elizabeth's letters to British journalists attracted the attention of the Knights Liberators and Anti-Piratical Society. This organisation awarded her with membership and a gold medal.

The plight of these slaves was taken up by the MP Henry Brougham in the British Parliament and in August 1816 the Regency of Algiers was forced to release 3,000 Christian slaves following the bombardment of Algiers by an Anglo-Dutch fleet led by Lord Exmouth. By this time Dalzel had married John Dickson and she was a mother to at least one of the six children she is known to have had. Dickson died a widow in Tripoli on 30 April 1862.
