= Robert Keate =

British surgeon

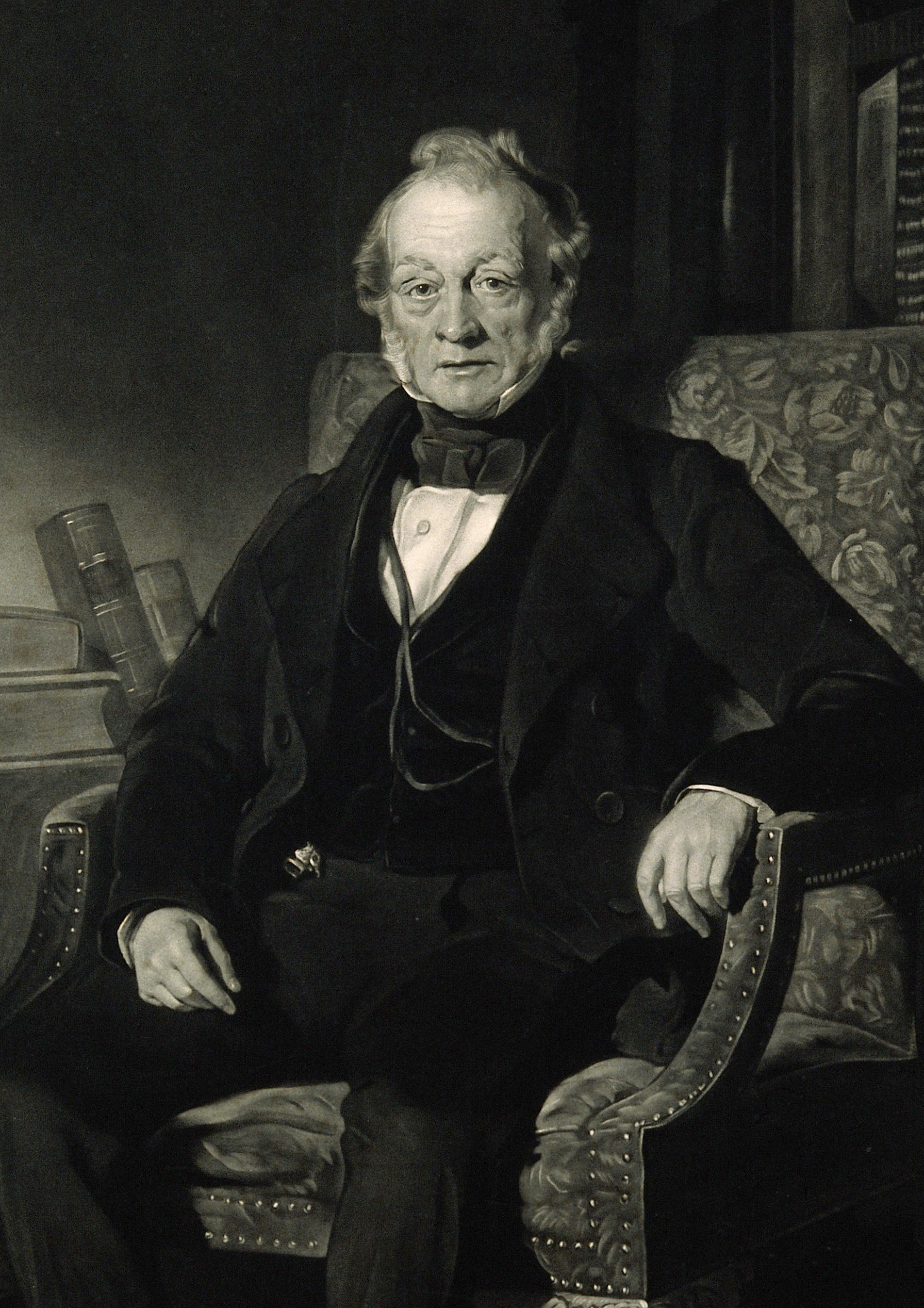
Robert Keate

Robert Keate FRCS (14 March 1777 – 2 October 1857) was a British surgeon, and Serjeant-Surgeon to King William IV and Queen Victoria.

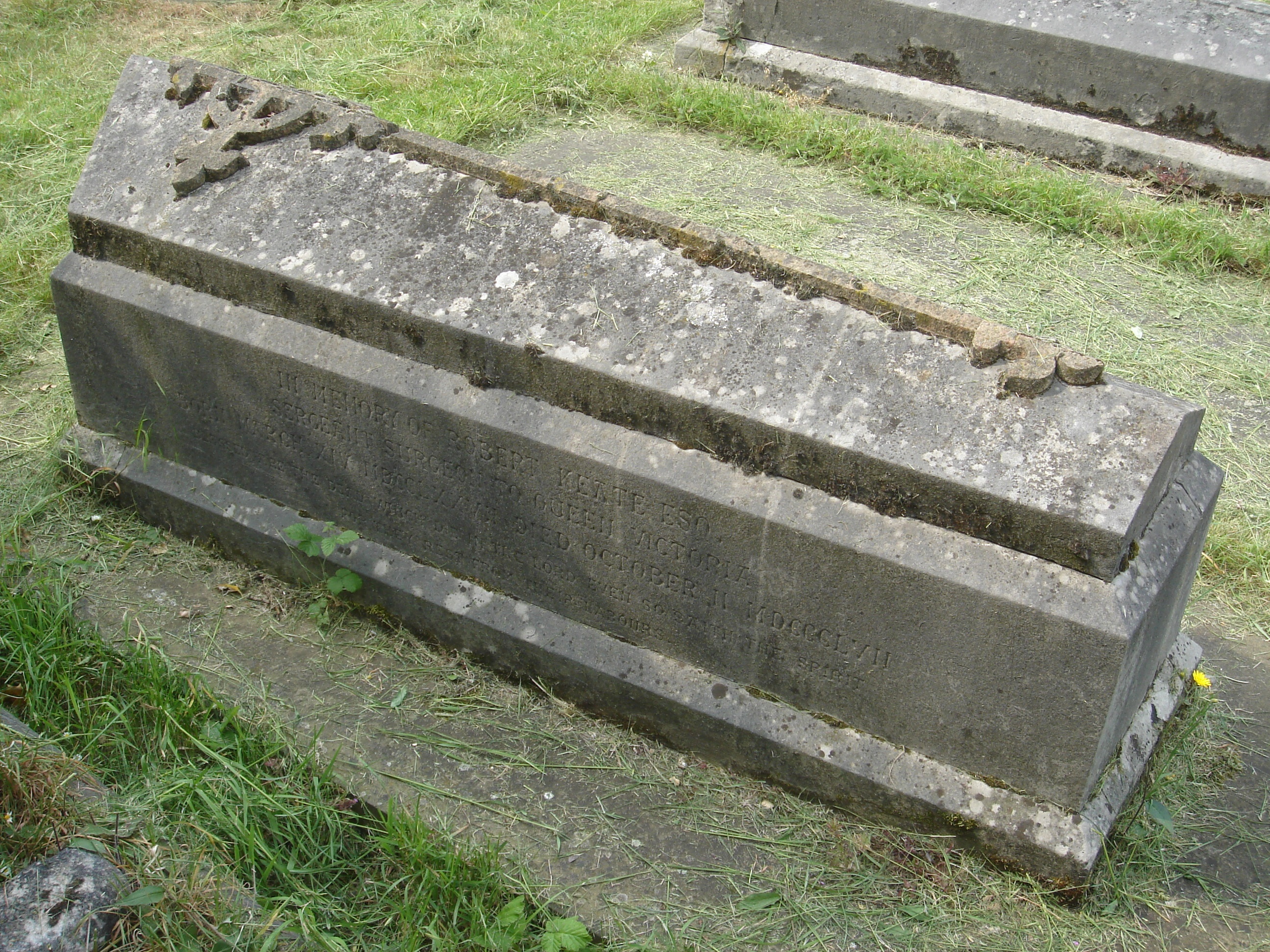
Funerary monument, Brompton Cemetery, London

== Early life ==
He was born in Laverton, Somerset, the fourth son of William Keate, rector of Laverton, and brother of John Keate (1773–1852), headmaster of Eton College. Keate was educated at Bath Grammar School.

== Personal life ==
Keate had four daughters and two sons. His son, Robert William Keate (1814–1873), was in turn Governor of Trinidad, Governor of Natal, and Governor of the Gold Coast.

== Publications ==
Keate wrote only two papers: –

- “History of a Case of Bony Tumour containing Hydatids Successfully Removed from the Head of a Femur.” – Med.-Chir. Trans., 1819, x, 278.
- “Case of Exfoliation from the Basilar Process of the Occipital Bone and from the Atlas after Excessive Use of Mercury.” – Lond. Med. Gaz., 1834–5, xvi, 13 (with drawing): Le Gros Clark referred to the specimen and reproduced the drawing in the Med.-Chir. Trans., 1849, xxxii, 68.
