= William Robert Wolseley Winniett =

Royal Navy officer and colonial administrator

Sir William Robert Wolseley Winniett (2 March 1793 – 4 December 1850) was a Royal Navy officer and colonial administrator who served as the governor general of Gold Coast at Cape Coast Castle. He worked to abolish the Atlantic slave trade on the Slave Coast of West Africa.

== Royal Navy ==
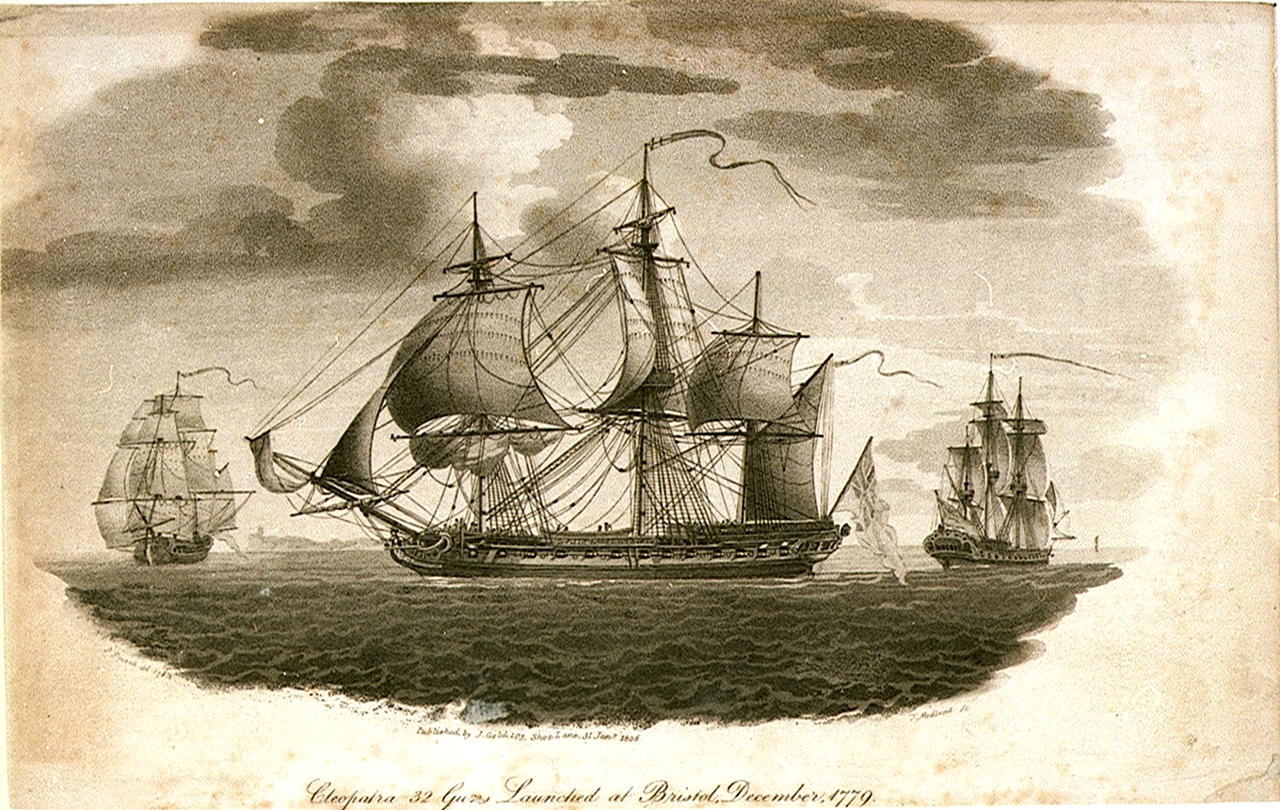
Winniett's first ship, HMS Cleopatra

Winniett joined the Royal Navy at Halifax, Nova Scotia in 1807 on HMS Cleopatra. While aboard Cleopatra, under the command of Samuel Pechell, Winniett fought in the action of 22 January 1809 and the Invasion of Martinique (1809).

He also served on the flagship HMS Tonnant under Sir Alexander Cochrane, Commander-in-Chief, North American Station (1814-1815). During that time, Winniett was involved in the Battle of Lake Borgne, in Louisiana in December 1814 and the Battle of New Orleans on 8 January 1815. Cochrane created a proclamation that invited Black slaves to freedom by joining the crews of the Royal Navy.

On 24 December 1818, he was assigned to Morgiana, which was on the African coastal patrol to suppress the slave trade. He commanded Viper (1837), Firefly (1839) and Lightning (1842).

== British Governor ==
On 24 October 1845 Winniett became lieutenant governor of the Gold Coast (Ghana), under the jurisdiction of the Governor of Sierra Leone. He went to the capital of Abomey (Benin) to try to abolish the slave trade (1847). (The Slave Trade Act 1807 outlawed the slave trade in the British Empire and the Slavery Abolition Act 1833 outlawed slavery altogether.)

In 1848 he led the West India Regiments and others to stop the murdering of Africans and Europeans by deposing Kaku Aka, the king of Amanahia [Apollonia] (also known as Kwaku Akka).

With Thomas Birch Freeman as his secretary, that same year, he went to persuade Ghezo, King of the Dahomey, in present-day Benin to stop the slave trade and abolish human sacrifice. (At the time Dahomey exported 8,000 slaves a year.) In September 1848, he visited the Ashanti Empire to convince Asantehene Kwaku Dua I to abolish human sacrifice.

He also purchased Dutch fortresses on the Slave Coast to end Dutch slave trade.

He was knighted by Queen Victoria on 29 June 1849 at Buckingham Palace.

He died 4 December 1850 at Jamestown/Usshertown, Accra and was interred in the cemetery at Fort Christiansborg (Ebenezer Presbyterian Church, Osu).

== Family ==
Winniett was the grandchild of Joseph Winniett (d. 1789) and the son of William Winniett (d.1824), both of Annapolis Royal, Nova Scotia. His family had seven boys and six girls. His great aunt Anne Cosby was married to Nova Scotia Council member Major Alexander Cosby. She freed her three black slaves in 1788.

He was the son-in-law of William Fenwick Williams.

Winniett was also the maternal grandson of New York Loyalist Joseph Totten, from whose family Tottenville, Staten Island was named.

== Legacy ==
The Royal Nova Scotia Historical Society placed a memorial at Sir Winniett's home in Annapolis Royal, Nova Scotia in 1880.

== See also ==
- List of governors of the Gold Coast
- Military history of Nova Scotia
- Black Nova Scotians

Government offices
Preceded by James Lelley	Governor of the Gold Coast; 1846–1849	Succeeded by James Coleman Fitzpatrick

Government offices
Preceded by James Coleman Fitzpatrick,	Governor of the Gold Coast; 1850	Succeeded by James Bannerman
