= George Maclean =

British colonial governor

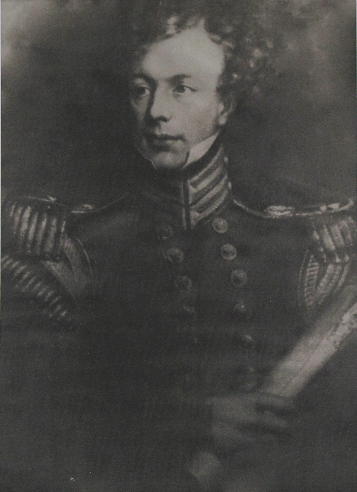
George Maclean, Governor of Gold Coast

George Maclean (24 February 1801 – 22 May 1847) was Governor of Gold Coast, now in Ghana, from 1830 until 1844.

== Life ==
Born in Keith, Banffshire, Scotland, he was the son of the minister, Rev, James Maclean, and his wife Elizabeth Tod, daughter of George Tod of Elgin. In the period 1815–7 he was an ensign in the 27th Foot, and then in the 91st Foot. In poor health, he retired from the Army in 1821.

Maclean was a member of the Royal African Colonial Corps, stationed in British West Africa from 1826 until 1828. In 1830 he became the Governor of Cape Coast, a position he retained until 1844.

In 1842 he was investigated by Richard Robert Madden, following the 1839 discovery by activists that British merchants operated from the Gold Coast were supplying slaving vessels. Madden found that Maclean had unfairly imprisoned 91 local people, some for as long as four years, on dubious grounds and without even the formality of a trial; and he also reported that Maclean illegally claimed that he had the authority to inflict capital punishment. Madden's enquiries, and subsequent parliamentary select committee, also concluded that Maclean lacked formal powers to act effectively against the trade, and the Colonial Office stepped in. Under the influence of James Stephen, the Gold Coast forts were detached from Sierra Leone and governed as a separate crown colony. Maclean came out of the investigation with credit.

Maclean was buried at Cape Coast Castle.

== Family ==
Maclean married poet Letitia Elizabeth Landon. They had no children. His half-brother, James (died 1877), a captain in the Gold Coast Corps, served under him.

Government offices
Preceded by John Jackson	Governor of the Committee of Merchants of the Gold Coast; 1830–1836	Succeeded by William Topp
Preceded by William Topp	Governor of the Committee of Merchants of the Gold Coast; 1838–1843	Succeeded by R. M. Worsley Hill as Governor of the Gold Coast
Police appointments
New title	Inspector General of Constabulary, Gold Coast; 1831–1844	Succeeded by Chief Frank Gilbert
