= Keates =

Keates is a surname. Notable people with the surname include:

- Albert Keates (1862–1949), British pipe organ builder
- Chris Keates (born 1951), British trade unionist
- Dean Keates (born 1978), British footballer
- Elizabeth Keates, British actress
- Jonathan Keates (born 1946), British writer, biographer and novelist
- Laura Keates (born 1988), British rugby union player
- Reginald Keates (born 1980), South African-born British cricketer
