= Kyte =

KYTE or Kyte may refer to:

== Places ==
- Kyte, Norway
- Kyte River, Illinois, United States

== Radio stations ==
- KYTE, a radio station (102.7 FM) licensed to Independence, Oregon, U.S.
- KUFO, a radio station (970 AM) licensed to Portland, Oregon, U.S., known as KYTE 1977–1990
- KXL-FM, a radio station (101.1 FM) licensed to Portland, Oregon, U.S., known as KYTE-FM 1977–1979, 1985–1989

== Other uses ==
- Kyte (band), English electronic indie pop group
- Kytes, German indie pop band
- Kyte (surname), including a list of people with the name
- Kyte (company), an American car rental company

== See also ==
- Kite
