= Robert William Harley =

British colonial administrator (1829-1892)

Sir Robert William Harley KCMG CB
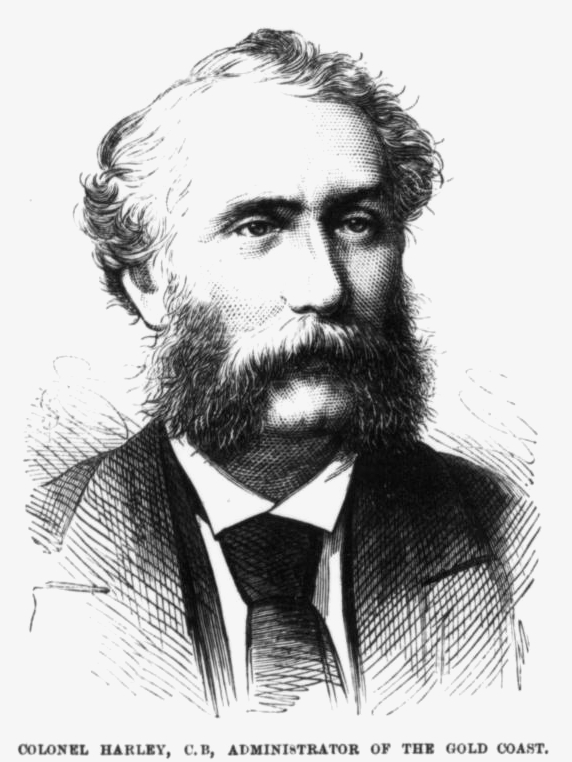

Governor of the Gold Coast
- In office September 1872 – 2 October 1873
- Monarch: Queen Victoria
- Preceded by: Robert William Keate
- Succeeded by: Garnet Joseph Wolseley

Lieutenant Governor of Tobago
- In office 1875–1877
- Preceded by: Herbert Taylor Ussher
- Succeeded by: Augustus Frederick Gore

Lieutenant Governor of Grenada
- In office 1877–1882
- Preceded by: Cyril Clerke Graham
- Succeeded by: Replaced by Administrator of Grenada

Lieutenant Governor of British Honduras
- In office 1883–1884
- Preceded by: Frederick Palgrave Barlee
- Succeeded by: Replaced by Governor of British Honduras

Personal details
- Born: 1829 Dublin, Ireland
- Died: 23 August 1892 (aged 62–63) Kensington, London

Colonel Sir Robert William Harley KCMG CB (1829 – 23 August 1892) was a British colonial administrator. He served as governor-in-chief of the Gold Coast, between September 1872 and 2 October 1873.

Harley was born in 1829 and joined the Army in 1847. In 1860 he was a captain in the 3rd West India Regiment. He died on 23 August 1892 at the age of 62.

Government offices
Preceded by Robert William Keate	Governor of the Gold Coast; 1872–1873	Succeeded by Garnet Joseph Wolseley
Preceded by Herbert Taylor Ussher	Lieutenant Governor of Tobago; 1875–1877	Succeeded by Augustus Frederick Gore
Preceded by Cyril Clerke Graham	Lieutenant Governor of Grenada; 1877–1882	Succeeded by Replaced by Administrator of Grenada
Preceded by Frederick Palgrave Barlee	Lieutenant Governor of British Honduras; 1883–1884	Succeeded by Replaced by Governor of British Honduras
