= Edmund Bannerman =

Journalist, newspaper proprietor and lawyer in the Gold Coast (c. 1832–1903)

- Born: 1832; Accra, Gold Coast
- Died: 17 April 1903 (aged 71); Jamestown, Accra, Gold Coast
- Occupations: Journalist; newspaper proprietor; solicitor
- Parent(s): James Bannerman and Yaa Hom
- Relatives: Osei Yaw Akoto (grandfather)

Edmund Bannerman (1832 – 17 April 1903) was a journalist, newspaper proprietor, solicitor and man of public affairs in the British colony of the Gold Coast. He was one of many members of the Bannerman family who flourished in the 19th-century Gold Coast in various public activities.

== Biography ==
Edmund Bannerman was born in about 1832 in Accra, Gold Coast, the third son of James Bannerman and Yaa Hom, daughter of the Asantehene (king of Asante) Osei Yaw Akoto. Bannerman was sent at the age of six to public school in his grandfather's native United Kingdom, where his older brothers Charles and James were also being educated.

Bannerman returned from Britain in 1847 and served for about nine years as secretary to several Gold Coast governors. He was known as the "Boss of Tarkwa", or "B of T", after his imposing residence, Tarqua(h) (Tarkwa) House, in Jamestown, Accra, and "he became popular with the Ga people for his agitation against policies of the colonial regime."

In March 1858, Bannerman was appointed as Civil Commandant of Keta by the Secretary of State for the Colonies, and was made a Justice of the Peace. In 1860, he was transferred to Winneba in a similar capacity. In 1864, after leaving government service, he was admitted to practise as advocate and attorney in the Courts of the Settlements. In 1877, he practised as a solicitor and in 1879 was made a Commissioner of Oaths.

After the death of his brother Charles, he succeeded him as the proprietor and editor of the West African Herald. Bannerman was also a special correspondent to the West African Times.

Bannerman died at the age of 71, on 17 April 1903, at his residence in Jamestown, Accra.

== See also ==
- Gold Coast Euro-Africans
