= Kite (surname) =

Kite is a surname. Notable people with the surname include:

- Bertram Kite (1857–1939), Dean of Hobart
- Brent Kite, Australian Rugby League player
- Fred Kite (1921–1993), highly decorated British soldier in World War II
- Gloria Kite (born 1998), Kenyan middle- and long-distance runner
- Greg Kite (born 1961), American former basketball player
- Harold Kite (1921–1965), NASCAR driver
- Jimmy Kite (born 1976), American race car driver
- John Kite, 16th century clergyman
- Jonathan Kite, American actor and impressionist
- Kelly Kite (born 1947), American politician
- Lucy Kite (born 1977), British TV presenter
- Marilyn S. Kite (born 1947), a justice of the Wyoming Supreme Court
- Melissa Kite, British journalist
- Phil Kite (footballer) (born 1962), English football goalkeeper
- Phil Kite (rugby union) (born 1993), Tongan rugby player
- Robert Kite, Lord Mayor of London in 1766
- Ross Kite, Australian rugby league footballer
- Sione Kite (born 1988), Australian rugby player
- Stephen Kite, American basketball player
- Tom Kite, American golfer
- William Kite, Victorian showman made famous in the song "Being for the Benefit of Mr. Kite!" by the Beatles

Fictional characters

- Fred Kite, bolshie shop steward played by Peter Sellers in the British comedy film I'm All Right Jack
