= James Bannerman =

Former governor of Ghana

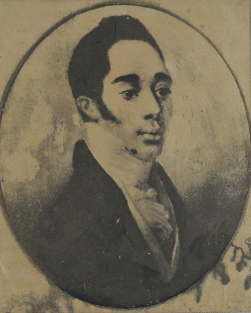
James Bannerman

James Bannerman (12 March 1790 – 18 March 1858) was a lieutenant and acting governor of the Gold Coast (part of modern Ghana) from 4 December 1850 to 14 October 1851.

== Life ==
James Bannerman was born a native of the Gold Coast in 1790 to a Fanti mother and a British father from Scotland, Colonel Henry Bannerman. Bannerman was educated in the Gold Coast and in Europe. Returning to the Gold Coast as a merchant, he was appointed a Justice of the Peace and was Civil Commandant of Christiansborg, Accra, from 1850 to 1857. He succeeded Governor William Winniett, who had died, as Lieutenant-Governor of the colony, and helped to introduce the Legislative Council of the Gold Coast.

He married an Ashanti princess, Yaa Hom or Yeboah, daughter of Osei Bonsu who was taken prisoner at the Battle of Katamanso in 1826. Together they had six children including Charles (who in 1857 founded the Accra Herald, later called the West African Herald), Edmund and James Junior. Thomas Hutton-Mills, Sr., was a grandson, and Charles Edward Woolhouse Bannerman a great-grandson.

Government offices
Preceded by Sir William Winniett	Governor of the Gold Coast; 1850–1851	Succeeded by Stephen John Hill
