= Reginald Keates =

South African-born English cricketer

Personal information
- Full name: Reginald Leslie Keates
- Born: 27 June 1980 (age 46); Johannesburg, Transvaal, South Africa
- Batting: Right-handed
- Bowling: Right-arm off break

Domestic team information
- Years: Team
- 2002–2005: Dorset

Career statistics
Competition	LA
Matches	3
Runs scored	3
Batting average	1.50
100s/50s	–/–
Top score	2
Balls bowled	120
Wickets	3
Bowling average	27.33
5 wickets in innings	–
10 wickets in match	–
Best bowling	2/48
Catches/stumpings	–/–
- Source: Cricinfo, 20 March 2010

Reginald Leslie Keates (born 27 June 1980) is a former South African born English cricketer. Keates was a right-handed batsman who bowled right-arm off break.

In 2002, Keates made his debut for Dorset in the Minor Counties Championship against Oxfordshire. From 2002 to 2005, he represented the county in 8 Minor Counties Championship matches, with his final match for the county coming against Herefordshire in 2005.

In 2002, Keates also made his List-A debut for Dorset against the Worcestershire Cricket Board in the 1st round of the 2003 Cheltenham & Gloucester Trophy, which was played in 2002. Keates represented the county in a further 2 List-A matches against Buckinghamshire in the 1st round of the 2004 Cheltenham & Gloucester Trophy which was played in 2003 and against Yorkshire in the 2nd round of the 2004 Cheltenham & Gloucester Trophy which was played in 2004.
