= Kight =

Kight is a surname. Notable people with the surname include:

- Charlotte Kight (born 1988), New Zealand netball player
- Dylan Kight (born 1984), American singer-songwriter
- E.G. Kight (born 1966), American Chicago blues singer, guitarist and songwriter
- Kelvin Kight (born 1982), American football player
- Lenore Kight (1911–2000), American swimmer
- Morris Kight (1919–2003), American gay rights activist
- Richard T. Kight (1913–2001), commander of the U.S. Air Rescue Service from 1946–1952
