= Keyte =

Keyte is a surname. Notable people with this surname include:

- David Keyte (born 1954), British businessman and football chairman
- Greg Keyte (living), New Zealand polo player
- Jared Keyte (living), American football coach and former player
- Jennifer Keyte (born 1960), Australian journalist and news presenter
- Lawrence Keyte (born 1963), Canadian modern pentathlete
- Naomi Keyte, member of The Transatlantics

== See also ==
- Keytesville, Missouri
- Keytesville Township, Chariton County, Missouri
- Daniel Sandford (scholar) (1798–1838; middle name Keyte), Scottish classical scholar
