= John Keate =

English schoolmaster (1773–1852)

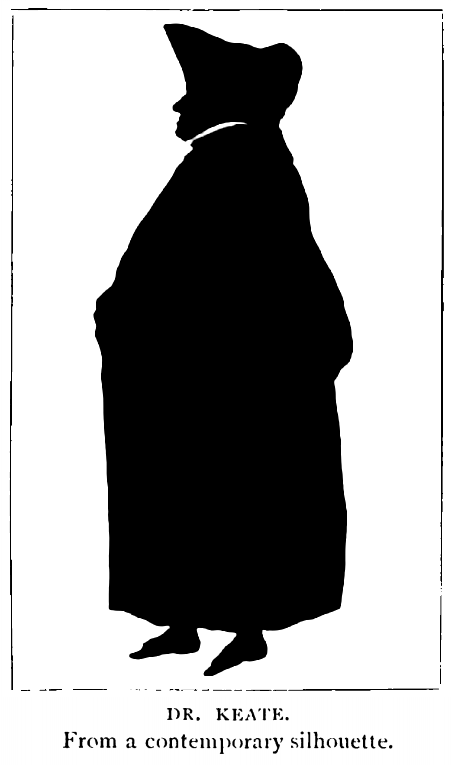
John Keate, silhouette

John Keate (30 March 1773 – 5 March 1852) was an English schoolmaster, and Head Master of Eton College.

He was born at Wells, Somerset, the son of Prebendary William Keate, rector of Laverton, Somerset, and brother of Robert Keate FRCS (1777–1857), Serjeant-Surgeon to King William IV and Queen Victoria.

He was educated at Eton, and was admitted to King's College, Cambridge in 1792, winning the Browne Medal in 1793, 1794 and 1795, and the Craven scholarship in 1794, graduating B.A. 1796, M.A. 1799, D.D. (per literas regias) 1810.

Taking holy orders, he became, about 1797, an assistant master at Eton College. In 1809 he was elected headmaster, having been "Under Master". Although his predecessor had been somewhat relaxed, and the teacher-pupil ratio was extremely low, the discipline of the school was not improved by the harsh measures that he took as headmaster, including large-scale floggings with the birch, resulting in mass rebellions by the boys. Following an attempted rebellion, Keate flogged more than 80 boys on a single day, 30 June 1832, an event known as the great flogging. He retired in 1834.

Keate was made a canon of the eighth stall of Windsor in 1820. He died at Hartley Wespall, Hampshire, of which parish he had been rector since 1824.

Academic offices
Preceded by Joseph Goodall	Head Master of Eton College; 1809–1834	Succeeded by Edward Craven Hawtrey
