= List of governors of the Gold Coast =

This is a list of colonial administrators in the Gold Coast (modern Ghana) from the start of English presence in 1621 until Ghana's independence from the United Kingdom in 1957. In addition to the Gold Coast Colony, the governor of the Gold Coast was for most of the period also responsible for the administration of the Ashanti Colony, the Northern Territories of the Gold Coast Protectorate and the League of Nations/United Nations mandate/trust territory of British Togoland.

== Governors of the Gold Coast (1621–1751) ==
Portrait	Name	Took office	Left office
	Sir William St John	1621	1623
	William Greenhill	1660	Unknown
	Henry Greenhill	1680	1685
	Henry Nurse	1685	1695
	John Bloome	1691	1697
	Baggs	1697	1701
	Sir Dalby Thomas	1703	1711

== Governors of the Committee of Merchants of the Gold Coast (1751–1822) ==
Portrait	Name	Took office	Left office
	Thomas Melvil	23 June 1751	23 January 1756
	William Tymewell	23 January 1756	17 February 1756
	Charles Bell	17 February 1756	15 October 1757
	Nassau Senior	15 October 1757	10 May 1761
	Charles Bell	10 May 1761	15 August 1763
	William Mutter	15 August 1763	1 March 1766
	John Hippersley	1 March 1766	11 August 1766
	Gilbert Petrie	11 August 1766	21 April 1769
	John Crossle	21 April 1769	11 August 1770
	Richard Miles	20 January 1777	25 March 1780
	John Roberts	25 March 1780	20 May 1781
	John B. Weuves	20 May 1781	29 April 1782
	Richard Miles	29 April 1782	29 January 1784
	James Morgue	29 January 1784	24 January 1787
	Thomas Price	24 January 1787	27 April 1787
	Thomas Morris	27 April 1787	20 June 1789
	William Fielde	20 June 1789	15 November 1791
	John Gordon	15 November 1791	31 March 1792
	Archibald Dalzel	31 March 1792	16 December 1798
	Jacob Mould	16 December 1798	4 January 1799
	John Gordon	4 January 1799	28 April 1800
	Archibald Dalzel	28 April 1800	30 September 1802
	Jacob Mould	30 September 1802	8 February 1805
	George Torrane	8 February 1805	4 December 1807
	Edward White	4 December 1807	21 April 1816
	Joseph Dawson	21 April 1816	19 January 1817
	John Hope Smith	19 January 1817	27 March 1822

== Governors of the Gold Coast (1822–1828) ==
- Sir Charles MacCarthy, 27 March 1822 – 17 May 1822, first time
- James Chisholm, 17 May 1822–December 1822, first time
- Sir Charles MacCarthy, December 1822–21 January 1824, second time
- James Chisholm, 21 January 1824 – 17 October 1824, second time
- Edward Purdon, 17 October 1824 – 22 March 1825
- Major-general Sir Charles Turner, 22 March 1825 – 8 March 1826
- Sir Neil Campbell, 18 May 1826 – 15 November 1826
- Major Henry John Ricketts, 15 November 1826 – 11 October 1827, first time
- Hugh Lumley, 11 October 1827 – 10 March 1828
- George Hingston, 10 March 1828 – 5 June 1828
- Major Henry John Ricketts, 5 June 1828 – 25 June 1828, second time

== Governors of the Committee of Merchants of the Gold Coast (1828–1843) ==
- John Jackson, 25 June 1828 – 19 February 1830
- George Maclean, 19 February 1830 – 26 June 1836, first time
- William Topp, 26 June 1836 – 15 August 1838
- George Maclean, 15 August 1838 – 1843, second time

== Governors of the Gold Coast (1843–1960) ==
In 1843 a governor was appointed subordinate to the Governor of Sierra Leone until 1850. After the Third Anglo-Ashanti War of 1873–74, the Gold Coast was formally declared a crown colony.

- Henry Worsley Hill, 1843–8 March 1845
- James Lelley, 8 March 1845 – 15 April 1846
- William Winniett, 15 April 1846 – 31 January 1849, first time
- James Coleman patrick, 31 January 1849 – 13 January 1850
- Sir William Winniett, 13 January 1850 – 4 December 1850, second time
- James Bannerman, 4 December 1850 – 14 October 1851
- Stephen John Hill, 14 October 1851–December 1854
- Henry Connor, December 1854–March 1857, acting
- Sir Benjamin Chilley Campbell Pine, March 1857–April 1858
- Henry Bird, April 1858–20 April 1860, acting
- Edward B. Andrews, 20 April 1860 – 14 April 1862
- William A. Ross, 14 April 1862 – 20 September 1862, acting
- Richard Pine, 20 September 1862 – 1865
- Rokeby Jones, 1865, acting
- William Elliot Mockler, 1865, acting
- Edward Conran, April 1865–February 1867
- Herbert Taylor Ussher, February 1867–April 1872, first time
- John Pope Hennessy, April 1872 – 1872
- Charles Spencer Salmon, 1872–September 1872, acting
- Robert William Keate 7 Mar 1873 – 17 Mar 1873
- Robert William Harley, September 1872–2 October 1873
- Garnet Joseph Wolseley, 2 October 1873 – 4 March 1874
- James Maxwell, 4 March 1874 – 30 March 1874, acting
- Charles Lees, 30 March 1874–June 1874, acting, first time
- George Cumine Strahan, June 1874–7 April 1876
- Charles Lees, 7 April 1876–December 1876, acting, second time
- Sanford Freeling, December 1876–13 May 1878, acting to 5 June 1877
- Charles Lees, 13 May 1878–June 1879, acting, third time
- Herbert Taylor Ussher, June 1879–1 December 1880, second time
- William Brandford Griffith, 1 December 1880 – 4 March 1881, acting, first time
- Sir Samuel Rowe, 4 March 1881 – 29 April 1884
- W. A. G. Young, 29 April 1884 – 24 April 1885
- William Brandford Griffith, 24 April 1885 – 7 April 1895, second time
- William Edward Maxwell, 7 April 1895 – 6 December 1897
- Frederick Mitchell Hodgson, 6 December 1897 – 29 August 1900, acting to 29 May 1898
- W. Low, 29 August 1900 – 17 December 1900, acting
- Sir Matthew Nathan, 17 December 1900 – 9 February 1904
- Herbert Bryan, 9 February 1904 – 3 March 1904, acting, first time
- John Pickersgill Rodger, 3 March 1904 – 19 September 1910
- Herbert Bryan, 19 September 1910 – 20 November 1910, acting, second time
- James Jamieson Thorburn, 21 November 1910 – 29 June 1912
- Herbert Bryan, 29 June 1912 – 26 December 1912, acting, third time
- Sir Hugh Charles Clifford, 26 December 1912 – 1 April 1919
- Alexander Ransford Slater, 1 April 1919 – 8 October 1919, acting, first time
- Frederick Gordon Guggisberg, 9 October 1919 – 24 April 1927
- Sir James Crawford Maxwell, 24 April 1927 – 5 June 1927, acting
- John Maxwell, 5 June 1927–July 1927, acting
- Sir Alexander Ransford Slater, July 1927–5 April 1932, second time
- Geoffry Northcote, 5 April 1932 – 29 November 1932, acting, first time
- Sir Shenton Thomas, 30 November 1932 – 13 May 1934
- Geoffry Northcote, 13 May 1934 – 23 October 1934, acting, second time
- Sir Arnold Weinholt Hodson, 24 October 1934 – 24 October 1941
- Sir George Ernest London, 24 October 1941 – 29 June 1942, acting, first time
- Sir Alan Cuthbert Maxwell Burns, 29 June 1942 – 2 August 1947
- Sir George Ernest London, 2 August 1947 – 12 January 1948, acting, second time
- Sir Gerald Hallen Creasy, 12 January 1948 – 15 February 1949
- Sir Robert Scott, 15 February 1949 – 28 March 1949, acting, first time
- Thorleif Rattray Orde Mangin, 28 March 1949 – 11 June 1949, acting
- Sir Robert Scott, 11 June 1949 – 11 August 1949, acting, second time
- Sir Charles Noble Arden-Clarke, 11 August 1949 – 6 March 1957.

== Governor-General of Ghana (1957–1960) ==
- William Hare, 5th Earl of Listowel, March 1957 – July 1960

In 1957, the Gold Coast Colony, the Ashanti Colony, the Northern Territories of the Gold Coast Protectorate and the British Togoland Trust Territory, became an independent realm within the British Commonwealth of Nations called Ghana. The Governor-General of Ghana served as the representative of the Queen of Ghana, whose formal title in Ghana was ‘Her Majesty Elizabeth the Second, Queen of Ghana and of Her other Realms and Territories, Head of the Commonwealth’. The entire dominion formed part of Her Majesty's dominions until the country became a republic in 1960.

== See also ==
- History of Ghana
- List of heads of state of Ghana
- List of Ghana governments
- List of colonial heads of Sierra Leone
- Lists of incumbents

== Sources ==
- http://www.rulers.org/rulg1.html#ghana
- http://www.worldstatesmen.org/Ghana.html
- http://www.britishempire.co.uk/maproom/goldcoast/goldcoastadmin.htm
