= Cape Coast Castle =

Former fortified colonial trading post in Ghana

UNESCO World Heritage Site
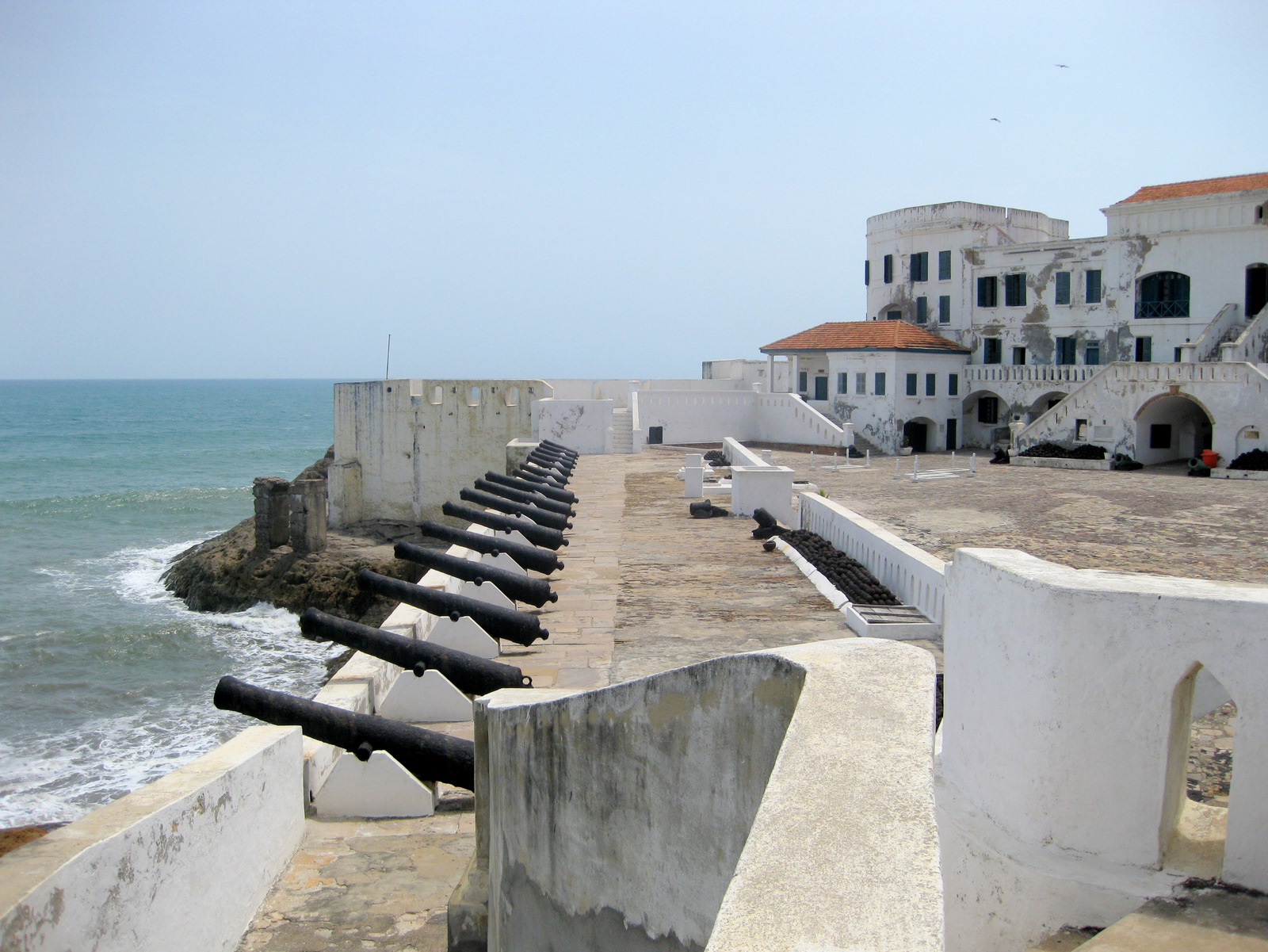

- Location within Ghana
- Official name: Cape Coast Castle
- Location: Central Region
- Part of: Forts and Castles, Volta, Greater Accra, Central and Western Regions
- Criteria: Cultural: (vi)
- Inscription: 1979 (3rd Session)
- Coordinates: 5°06′13″N 1°14′28″W

Cape Coast Castle (Swedish: Carolusborg) is one of about forty "slave castles", or large commercial forts, built on the Gold Coast of West Africa (now Ghana) by European traders. Cape Coast Castle is located in the Central Region of Ghana. It was originally a Portuguese "feitoria" or trading post, established in 1555, which was named Cabo Corso, meaning "Short Cape."

In 1653, a timber fort was constructed by the Swedish Africa Company. The fort originally was named Carolusborg after Charles X Gustav and was built as a center for timber and gold trade. In the 18th century, its dungeons were used in the Atlantic slave trade. Other Ghanaian slave castles include Elmina Castle and Fort Christiansborg. They were used to harbor enslaved Africans before they were loaded onto ships and sold in the Americas, especially the Caribbean. This "gate of no return" was the last stop before crossing the Atlantic Ocean. Cape Coast Castle, along with other forts and castles in Ghana, are included on the UNESCO World Heritage List because of their testimony to the Atlantic gold and slave trades.

The large quantity of gold dust found in Ghana was what primarily attracted European traders, and many natives of Cape Coast used this to their advantage. In exchange for gold, mahogany, and other locally produced goods and enslaved captives, local Africans received clothing, blankets, spices, sugar, silk and many other items. Cape Coast Castle was a market where this barter trade took place. In addition, the "Account of the Limits and Trade of the Royal African Company" stated the agent-general at Cape Coast Castle would supply trading forts with goods intended to be traded for gold, ivory, and slaves.

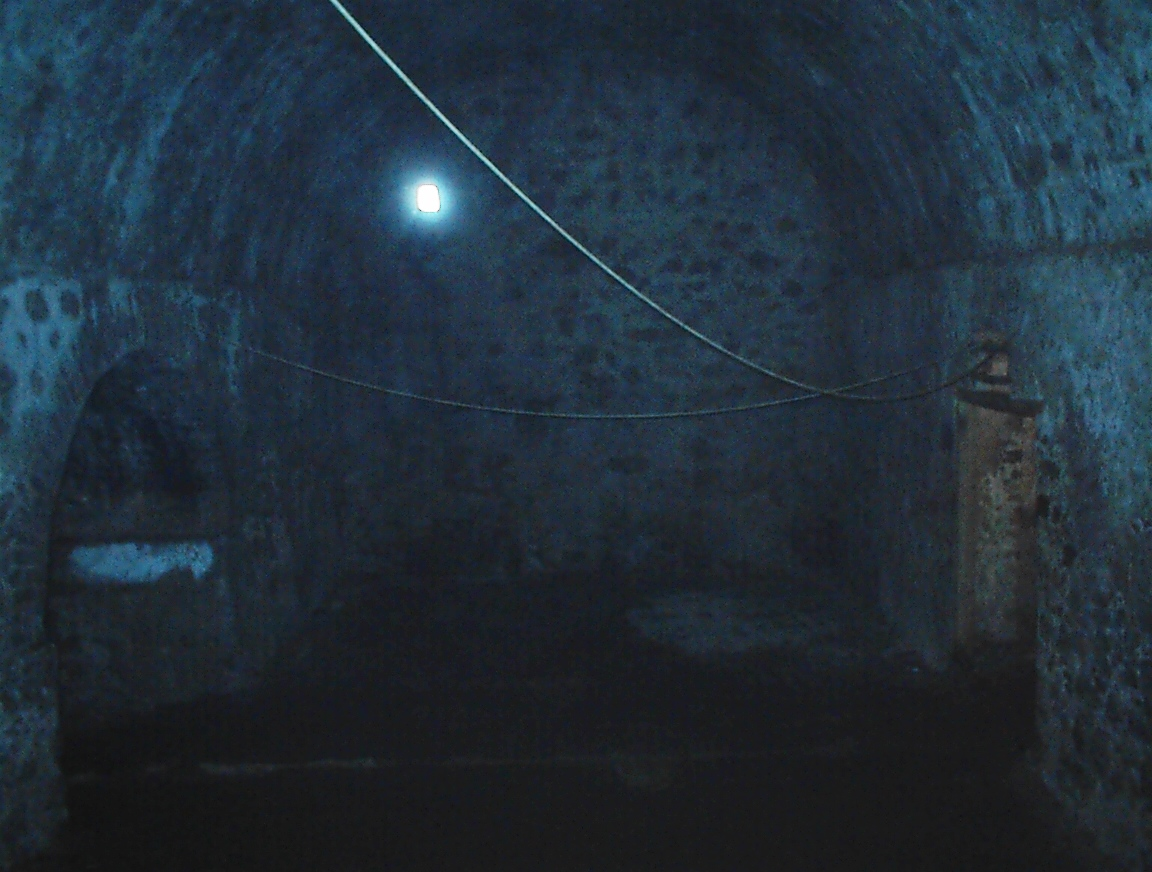
Inside the dungeon of Cape Coast Castle, where hundreds of enslaved people were held in cramped conditions before being transferred to boats bound for the western hemisphere

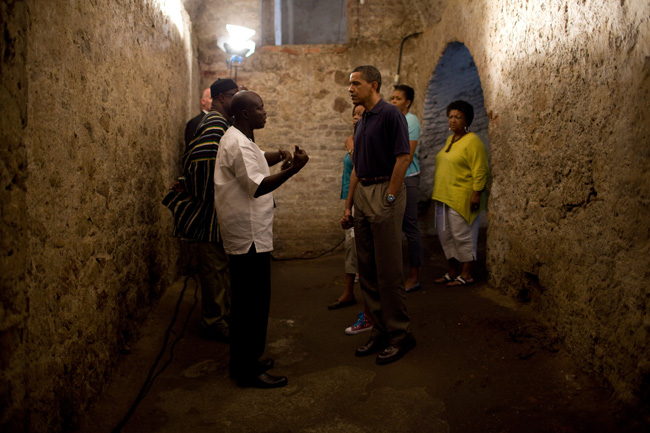
U.S. President Barack Obama and his family inside one of the dungeons during a visit to the Cape Coast Castle in 2009

Enslaved Africans were a valuable commodity in the Americas, the Middle East, and elsewhere, and enslaved people were the main trade in Cape Coast. Due to this, many changes were made to the fort. One of the alterations was the addition of large, underground dungeons that could hold as many as a thousand enslaved people awaiting export. Many European nations flocked to the area in order to get a foothold in the slave trade. The business was very competitive, which led to conflict and for this reason, the forts changed hands many times during the course of its commercial history.

In 1672, the "Royal African Company of England was given a legal monopoly on English trade ‘for a thousand years’ along the entire western coast of Africa from the edge of the desert in the north to the Cape of Good Hope in the south," and the company would expand Cape Coast Castle in the decades to come. The Royal African Company found itself unable to enforce its monopoly due to a loss of ships from pirates and privateers and unafflicted slave captains who could undercut their prices because they "paid nothing towards the costs of the Castle and the forts”.

Slaves were valuable enough that the French were forbidden from trading "in Africa, at cape Appollonia, or between it and the river Volta, where, and at Popo and Whidah, to the eastward of that river," where slaves were obtained for sugar plantations. Such that, the "late company’s governor" at Cape Coast Castle upon seeing a French ship, sent a messenger with the following message, "You are ordered on board the French vessel, to tell the master, the governor and council do not make trade with the subjects of France, nor do they suffer the natives to trade with them. But as there subsists a good friendship and alliance between the king of Great Britain and the French king, if the master should be distressed for water, or such like necessaries, he might have it upon application, by admitting an officer on board, to prevent his having intercourse with the natives, or others, till he should have received such supplies; but that he should not be allowed to trade to the westward of the river Volta, which if he attempted, proper measures would be taken to prevent and obstruct his commerce. Therefore, should he neglect those orders, and receive any damage thereby, it would be his own fault; as the governor and council held the trade of the Gold Coast, the indubitable right and property of the Royal African company of England."

In 1750, the Royal African Company was abolished by the African Company Act 1750 (24 Geo. 2. c. 49), with Parliament also removing the monopoly of trading in Africa that had previously belonged to the Royal African Company. In its place, "Parliament provided a public subsidy to the slaving industry as a whole in the form of a block grant to a private sector body, the Company of Merchants Trading to Africa, who took over the Castle, the forts, and the previous employees." The company's committee consisted of important members of the slaving industry in London, Bristol, and Liverpool.

In 1777, the African Company of Merchants at Cape Coast Castle experienced stagnation by attempting to lower the price of slaves. Their plan was disrupted by a French ship that arrived at Annamaboa, and Captain Cotton intended on driving away the French ship to proceed with the company's intentions to lower the price of slaves.

== Living conditions ==
In Cape Coast Castle, the underground dungeon was a space of terror, death, and darkness. This stood as a direct juxtaposition to the European living quarters and commanding heights of the administrative quarters above, whose occupants lived relatively luxuriously. The basement of this imposing fortress was often the last experience enslaved people had of their homeland before being shipped off across the Atlantic, as this signified the beginning of their journey.

The dungeon was built into the rock foundation of the slave castle and is described as "[c]ut into the rock, beneath the parade ground” that formed part of the castle’s large, open courtyard, the facility “consist of[ed] of large vaulted cellars, divided into several apartments which [could] easily hold a thousand slaves.” It was unknown exactly when the dungeon was built. However, the dungeon is estimated to have been built by 1682.

Jean Barbot, a French traveler described the dungeon as "a very handsome place of arms, well paved; under which a spacious mansion, or place to keep slaves in, cut out of the rocky ground, arch’s, and divided into several rooms; so that it will conveniently contain a thousand Blacks, let down at an opening made for the purpose. The keeping of the slaves thus underground is a good security to the garrison against any insurrection."

In the first decade of the 18th century, Cape Coast Castle was determined to be overcrowded. In addition, the shackles were considered to be uncomfortable. The chief agent at Cape Coast Castle stated about the shackles, "Double Irons are too painful for ye Slaves."

Cape Coast Castle, among other slave castles and coasting slave ships, were locations intended on transforming its captives into slaves, along the lines of "a scientific empiricism always seeking to find the limits of human capacity for suffering."

However, not all slaves at Cape Coast Castle were slaves intended for the Atlantic slave trade. The Royal African Company distinguished between "shipping slaves," or "slaves in chains," slaves who were intended for the slave trade and "castle slaves," or "Arda slaves," slaves who lived and worked the Royal African Company at Cape Coast Castle.

At Cape Coast Castle, in January 1682, nine chests of corn were allocated daily for feeding the eight "chain slaves," in addition to one-fifth a bushel of grain. However, the supply of corn and its daily allocation depended on the local price of corn and the budget of the slave castle, and occasionally, the Cape Coast Castle could not feed all its prisoners. In June 1683, Cape Coast Castle had six chests of corn and an inability to acquire corn in the local market lead to its prisoners starving. The factor wrote, "Beg a supply within this week, else must send what slaves I have to Cabo Corso in the 5-hand canoe for they will be starved else.”

In 1777, Cape Coast Castle was reported to house 12 soldiers, and 288 castles slaves: 157 men, 96 women, and 35 children.

== Building history ==
The first fort established on the present site of Cape Coast Castle was built by Hendrik Caerloff for the Swedish Africa Company. Caerloff was a former employee of the Dutch West India Company who had risen to the rank of fiscal administrator before employing himself with the latter company established by Louis de Geer. As a former high-ranking officer of the Dutch, Caerloff had the friendly relations with the local chiefs necessary to establish a trading post. In 1650, Caerloff succeeded in getting the permission of the king of Fetu to establish a fort at Cabo Corso (meaning "short cape" in Portuguese, later corrupted to English Cape Coast). The first timber lodge was erected at the site in 1653 and named Carolusborg after King Charles X of Sweden.

Caerloff returned to Europe in 1655, leaving Johann Philipp von Krusenstjerna in charge of Carolusborg. Louis de Geer had, however, died in the meantime, and Caerloff got himself involved in a serious dispute with his heirs. In Amsterdam, he convinced merchants to give a financial injection to the Danish West India Company, for which he set sail to the Gold Coast in 1657, with the goal in mind to capture for Denmark the Swedish lodges and forts he had established himself. With the help of the Dutch, Caerloff succeeded in driving the Swedes out, leaving the Gold Coast on the captured ship Stockholm's Slott, and with Von Krusenstjerna on board as a prisoner.

Caerloff had left Samuel Smit, also a former employee of the Dutch West India Company, in charge of Carolusborg. The Dutch were able to convince Smit in 1659 of the rumor that Denmark had been conquered by Sweden, upon which Smit rejoined the Dutch West India Company, handing over all Danish possessions to the Dutch. The King of Fetu was displeased with this, however, and prevented the Dutch from taking possession of the fort. A year later, the King decided to sell it to the Swedes. After the King died in 1663, the Dutch were finally able to occupy the fort.

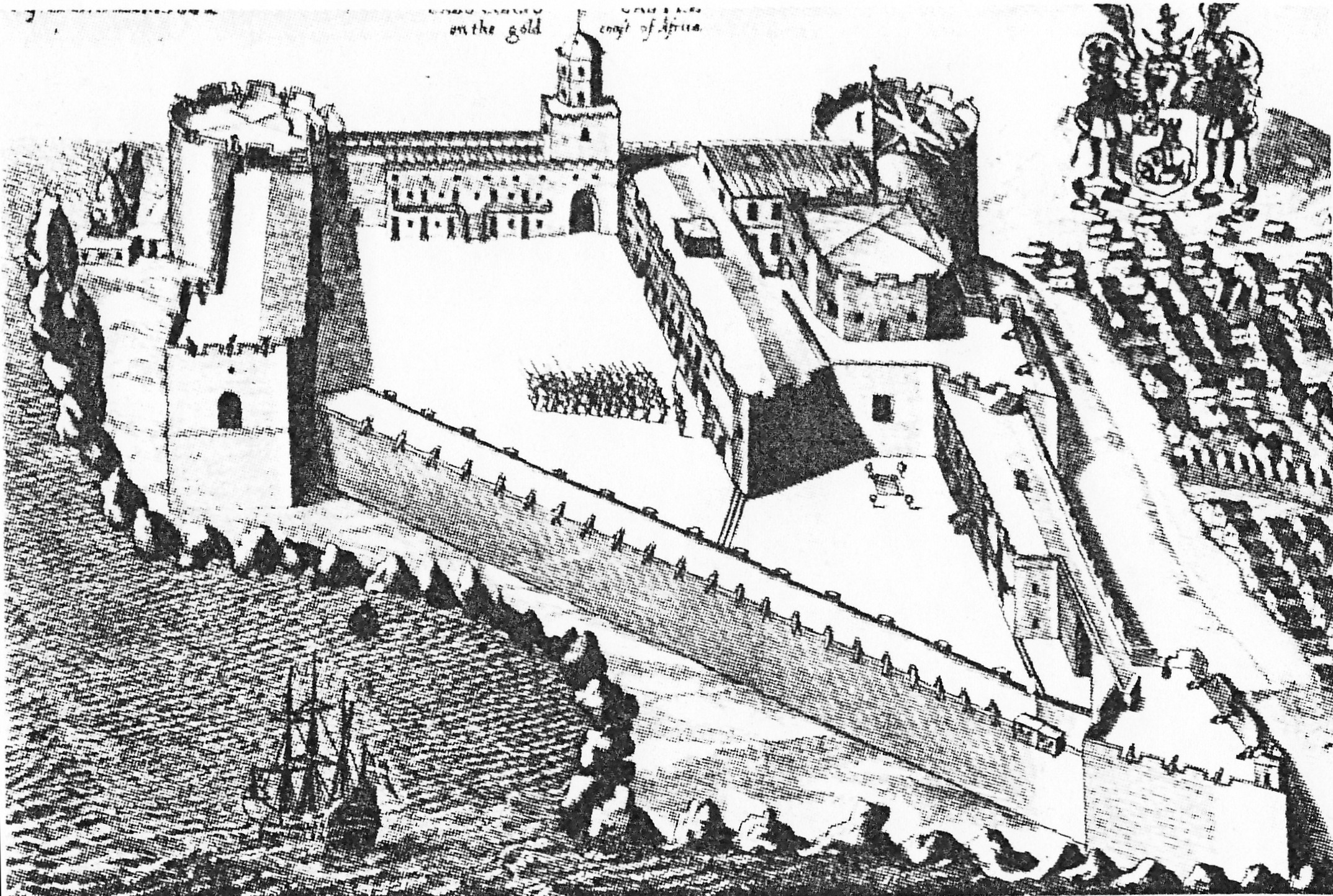
The English Castle in 1682

The Danes had in the meantime established another fort, Fort Frederiksborg (1661), just a few hundred meters east from Carolusborg. Although situated perfectly to launch an attack on Carolusborg, the English capture of Carolusborg (1664) during the prelude to the Second Anglo-Dutch War, prevented the Danes from challenging them; the English had reinforced the fort, which they named Cape Coast Castle, to such an extent that even Dutch Admiral Michiel de Ruyter deemed it impossible to conquer. The castle was described as "a strong regular [f]fortification," with "four bulwarks, seventy guns, and two hundred and fifty men."

In 1664, Sir Robert Holms captured Cape Coast Castle along with the "[F]orts of Tekorari ..., Aaia, and Anemabo," on behalf of the Royal African Company. In 1665, Admiral Ruyter recaptured Fort Cormann/ Fort Amsterdam. He had intended on recapturing Cape Coast Castle, but the English "possessed themselves of a place where a hundred men might beat off a thousand," an indication that the English fortifications at Cape Coast Castle were stronger than the Dutch forces, and Ruyter's design "was laid aside."

As the Dutch had captured the former English headquarters at Kormantsin and had rebuilt it as Fort Amsterdam, Cape Coast became the new capital of the English possessions on the Gold Coast.

In 1689, the pirate Duncan Mackintosh was hanged at the Castle with a few of his crew, though he would not be the last pirate hanged at the fort. In 1722, the fort was the site where 54 men of the crew of the pirate Bartholomew Roberts were condemned to death, of whom 52 were hanged and two reprieved.

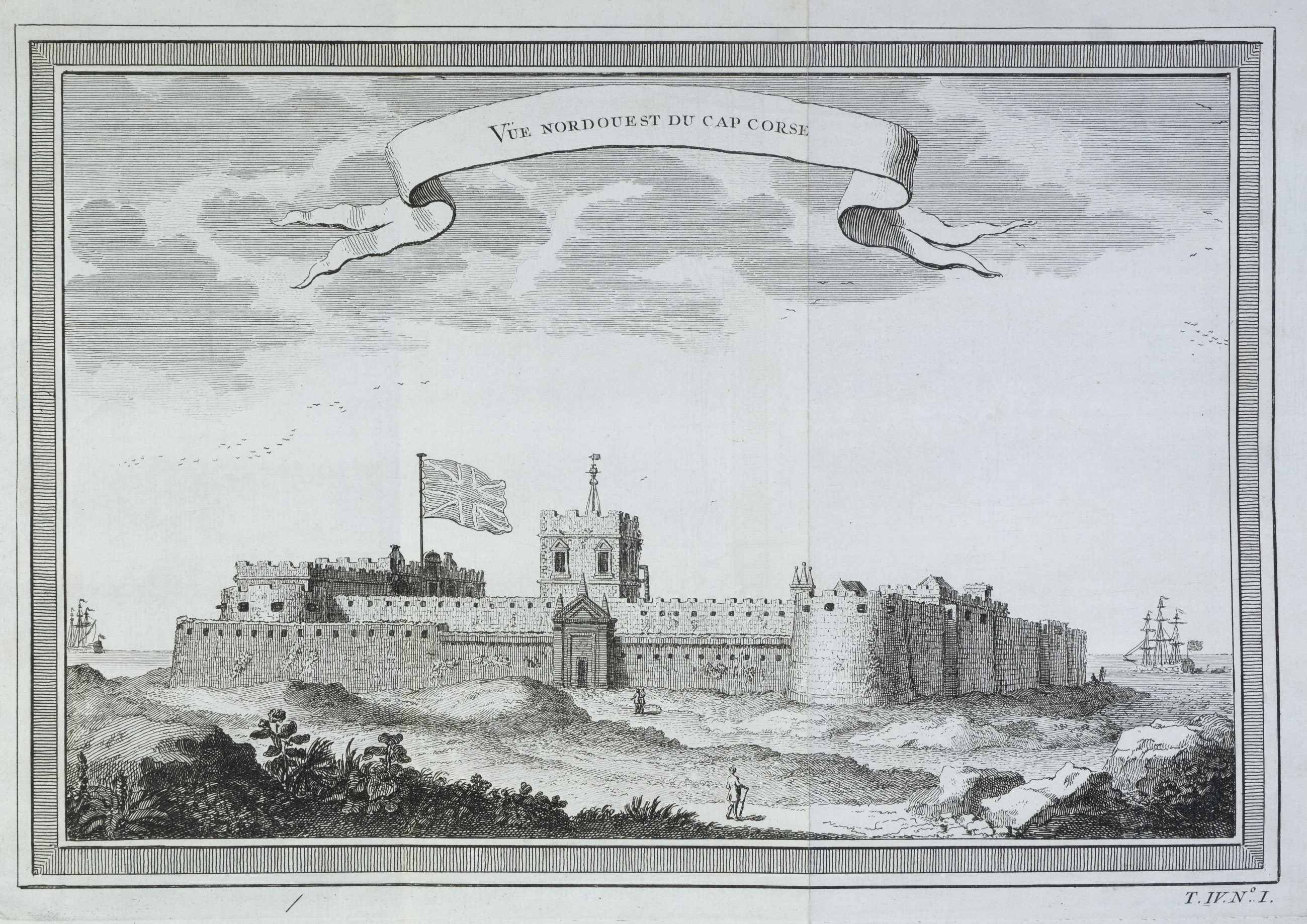
Cape Coast in 1747

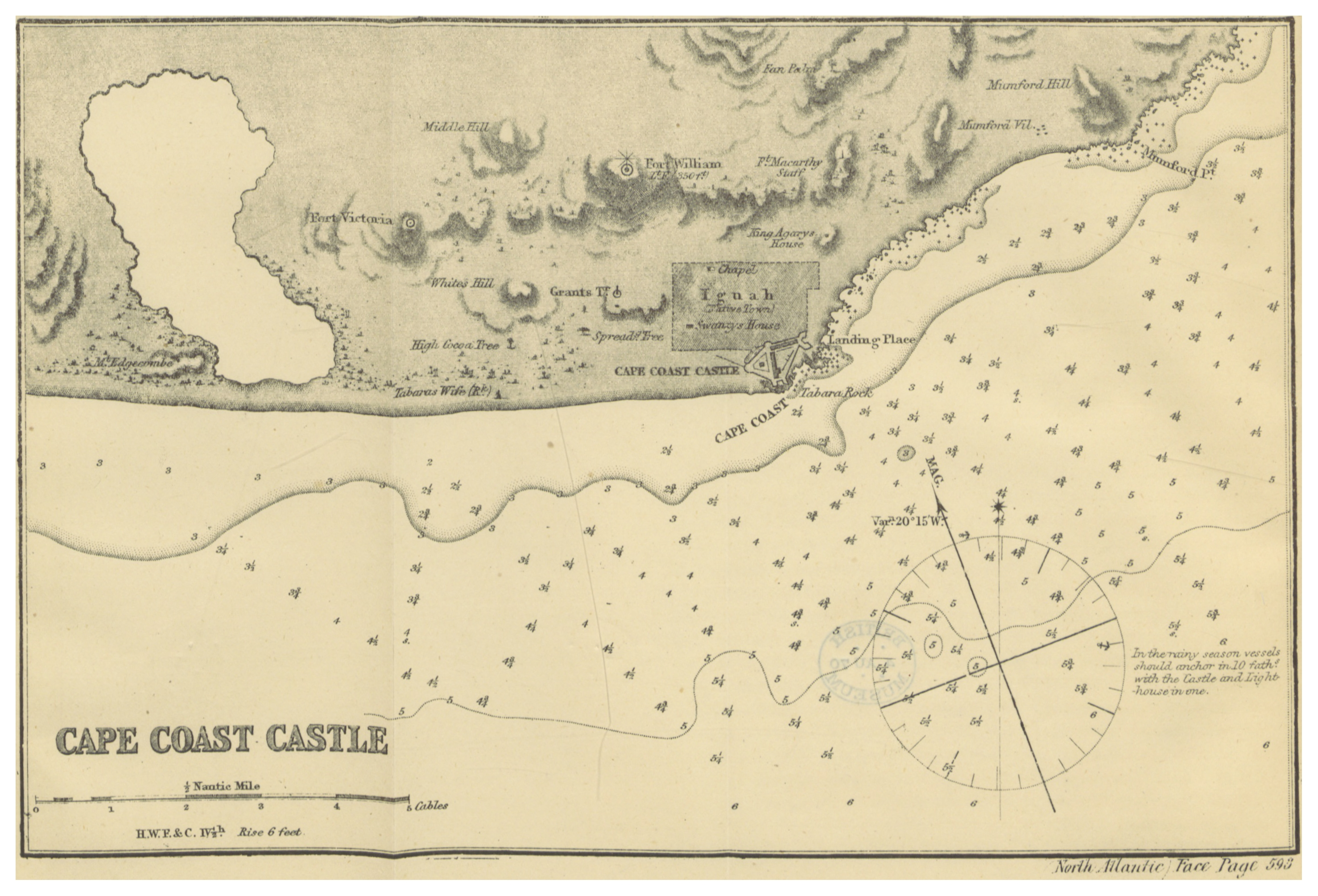
Map of Cape Coast Castle (1869)

In 1757, during the Seven Years' War, a French naval squadron badly damaged and nearly captured Cape Coast Castle. This event was likely one of the most important reasons to entirely reconstruct the Castle, which was quite notorious for its collapsing walls and leaking roofs. In 1762, an extensive spur ending in a tower was built on the western side and in 1773, a high building along the north curtain was erected, during which the last remnants of the 17th-century fort were demolished. Greenhill Point, a bastion to the east of the castle, was replaced by two new bastions, with a sea gate in the middle. To the south, two new bastions, named Grassle's Bastions, replaced an old round tower as the main defensive work. The tower, which now had no military use, was extended in the 1790s with two stories, now becoming the governors' apartments. The space below Grassle's Bastions was used as the new slave dungeons.

== Gold Coast ==
Starting as the Gold Coast, now the Republic of Ghana, due to the vast supplies and marketing of gold, Europeans took over and built forts and castles, one such as Carolusborg, on the "Gold Coast" and used the enslaved Africans to work and protect the trade, to obtain the abundance of gold. Heading into the 17th century and continuing into the 19th century, cacao, cocoa beans, started to become the major shift of trade resources, turning away from gold.

== Siege of Carolusborg (1652) ==
After the construction of Carolusborg in 1652, the Dutch saw it as a clear threat to their trade monopoly and began plotting a way to drive the Swedes away, a siege was organized in 1652, but it ended in failure as the Swedes refused to surrender.

== Republic of Ghana ==
Originally the Gold Coast, Ghana is located in West Africa, bordering the Gulf of Guinea and has 261 districts, which are divvied into 16 regions. Cape Coast falls under the Central Region of Ghana. The Central Region is along the southern most exterior of Ghana and is surrounded by the Western, Western North, Ashanti, Eastern, and Greater Accra Regions. As becoming what we know today as Ghana, Kwame Nkrumah led the colony to independence on March 6, 1957. This breaking away inspirited other African countries to do the same for the next decade.

== Notable governors ==
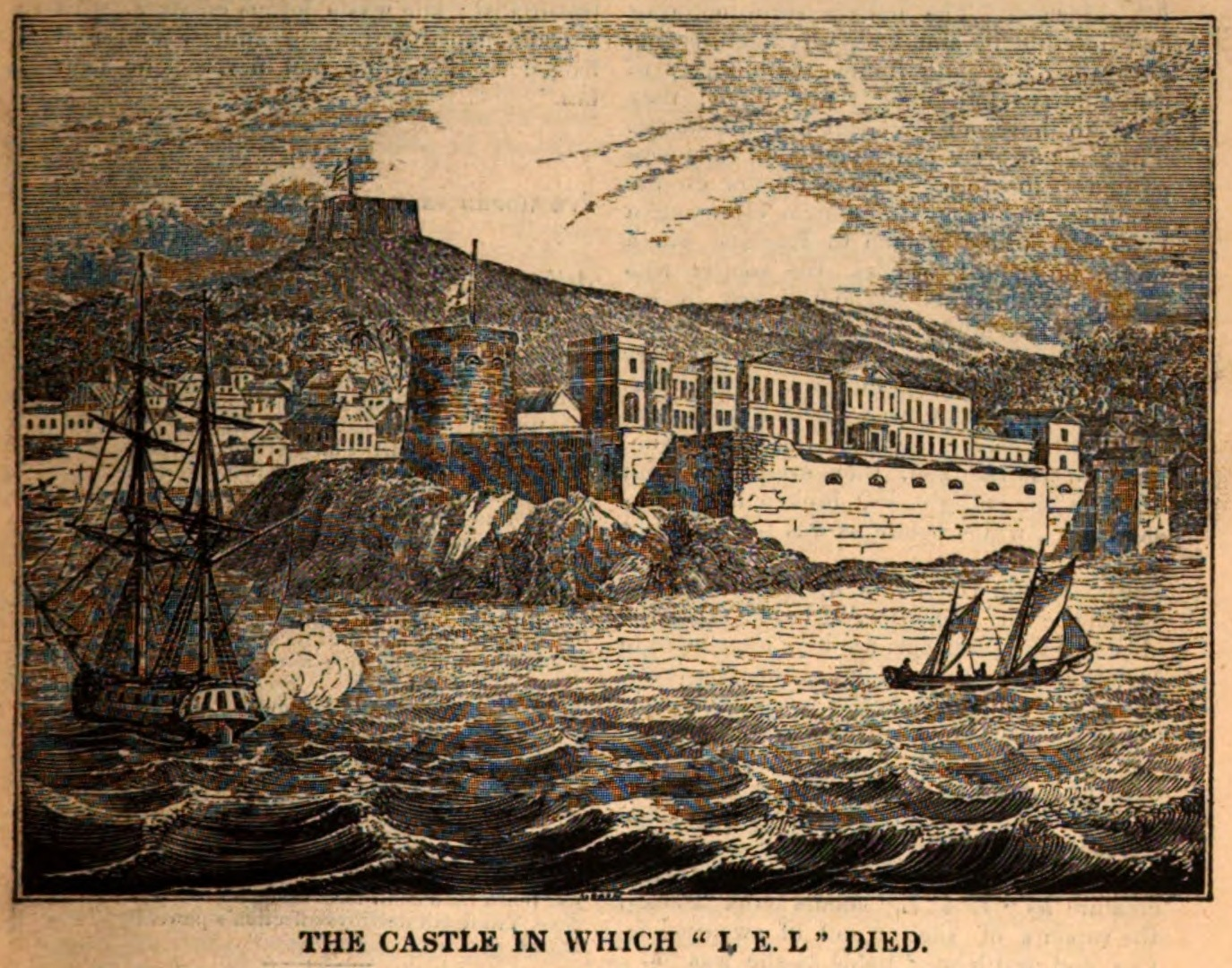
Engraving of Cape Coast Castle, depicting where Letitia Elizabeth Landon died in October 1838

In 1824, British Governor Sir Charles MacCarthy, was defeated by the Ashanti army, committed suicide, and his skull was taken back to the Ashanti capital Kumasi where it was reportedly used as a drinking cup. George Maclean was President of the Committee of Merchants at Cape Coast Castle from 1830 until 1844, a period when a President rather than a Governor ruled the British in the Gold Coast. In October 1836 he met the poet Letitia Landon at a dinner party while on a visit to the UK. They married and traveled back to Cape Coast Castle where, within two months, Landon died of heart failure. Both Maclean and Landon are buried in the castle courtyard. Maclean was charged with putting an end to slave trading and did so along 300 km (200 mi) of the West African coast. However, his reputation was muddied by his willingness to support the ownership of enslaved people within the vicinity of Cape Coast Castle. As such he was demoted to Judicial Assessor and maintained for his extensive local knowledge and commitment to trade. He also made peace with the Ashanti (Treaty of 1831), instituted a judicial system still in use in many African democracies, and encouraged successful and fair trading. From 1846–1850, Governor William Winniett was also active in ending the slave trade. He died in the fortress.

== Restoration ==
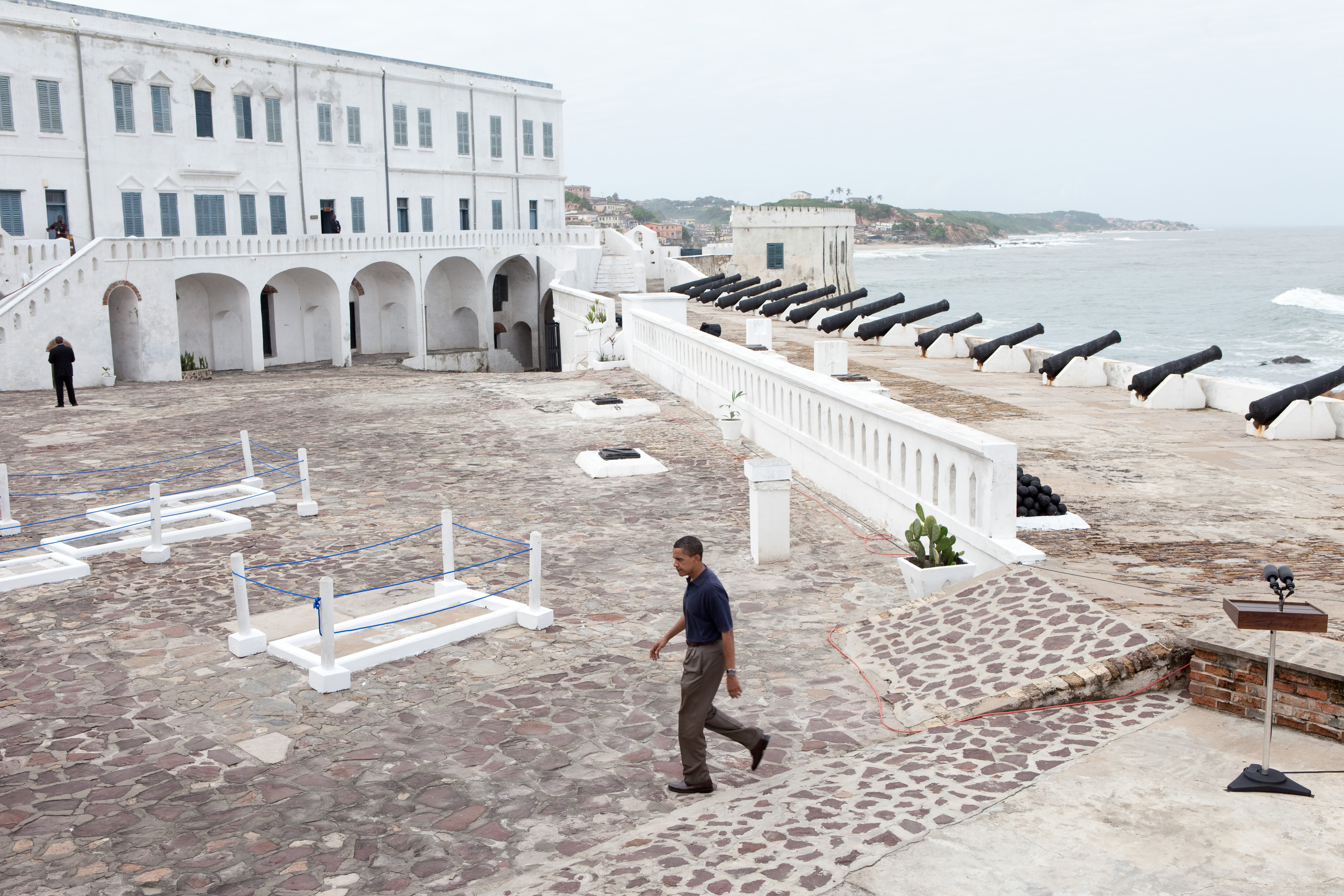
U.S. President Barack Obama visiting the castle in 2009

The castle, or castle and dungeon, to give it its official name, was first restored in the 1920s by the British Public Works Department.

In 1957, when Ghana became independent, the castle came under the care of the Ghana Museums and Monuments Board (GMMB). In the early 1990s the building was restored by the Ghanaian Government, with funds from the United Nations Development Programmed (UNDP), United States Agency for International Development (USAID), with technical assistance from the Smithsonian Institution and other non-governmental organizations.

== Cultural references ==
The 2016 novel Homegoing by Yaa Gyasi makes frequent references to the Castle. The contrast in living conditions between the Europeans living above and the enslaved people living below are highlighted in the individual stories of two half-sisters, Effia and Esi, during their time at the castle. While Effia, the wife of an English slaver, lives in luxury, Esi suffers in the squalid living conditions in the dungeons below unbeknownst to her half-sister.

The 1993 film Sankofa also uses the castle as a critical location in the plot, referring to its past connections to the Atlantic slave trade.

The Swedish journalist and writer Janne Lundström wrote about the castle in a series of graphic novels about Johan Vilde, illustrated by Catalan comic artist Jaime Vallvé. The novels depict the young Swede Johan Karlsson who served as a cabin boy on a Swedish ship owned by the Swedish Africa Company. Due to mistreatment, Johan fled the ship, escaped into the inland was adopted by a local family.

== 3D documentation with terrestrial laser scanning ==
In 2015, the Zamani Project documented Cape Coast Castle with terrestrial 3D laser scanning. The non-profit research group specializes in 3D digital documentation of tangible cultural heritage. The data generated by the Zamani Project creates a permanent record that can be used for research, education, restoration, and conservation.

== Tourism ==
Since restoration under the Ghanaian Government, Cape Coast Castle was added into UNESCO World Heritage site, where it can now be visited and toured. Guided tours provide people insight into the lifestyles and conditions the castle set for different individuals. These tours showcase to people the view of the Atlantic Ocean form the Castle, the dungeons within the Castle, artifacts preserved in the museum, governor's and other admins' chambers, as well as defensive weapons the Castle was equipped with.

== Gallery ==
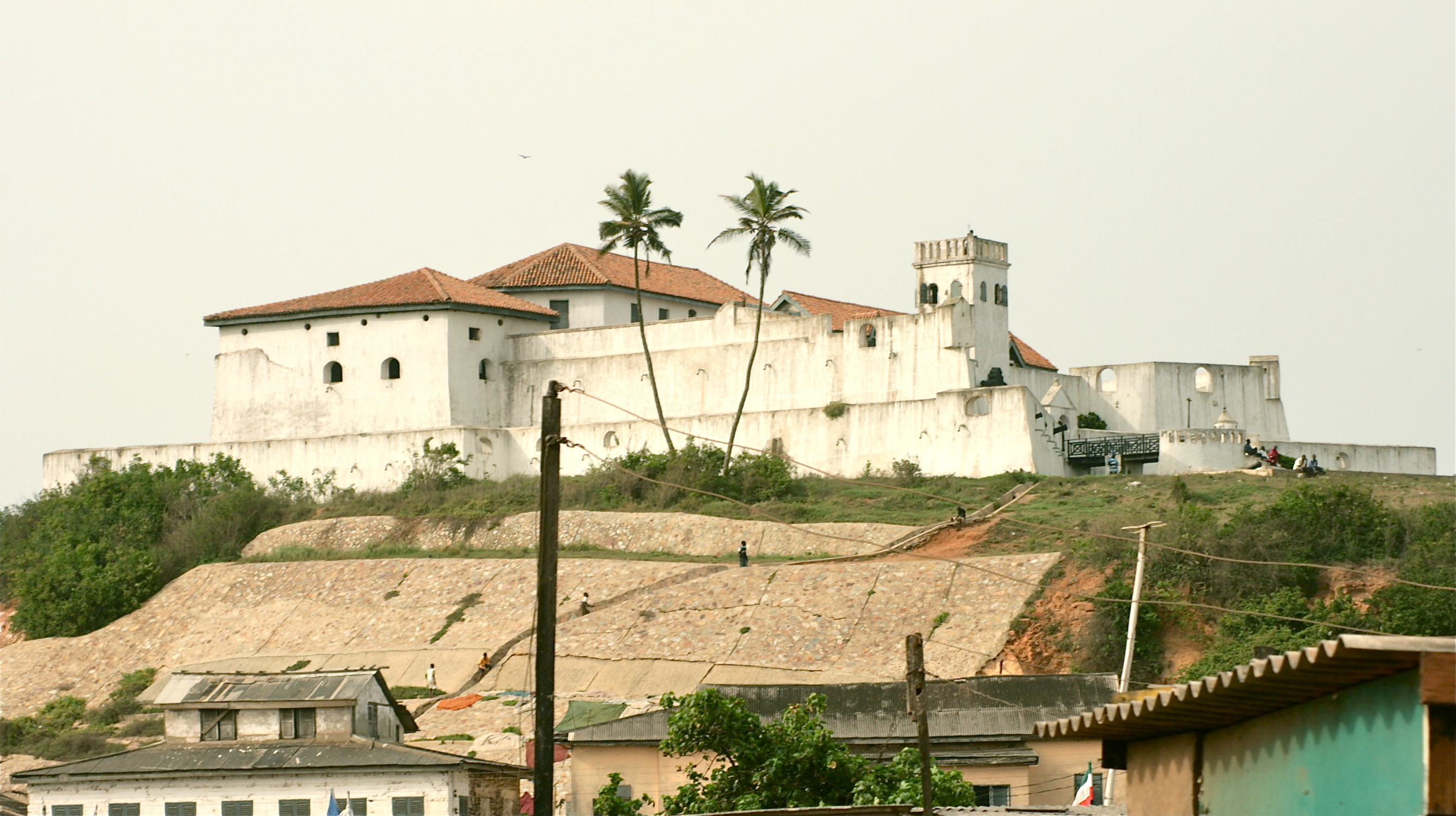
Cape Coast Castle

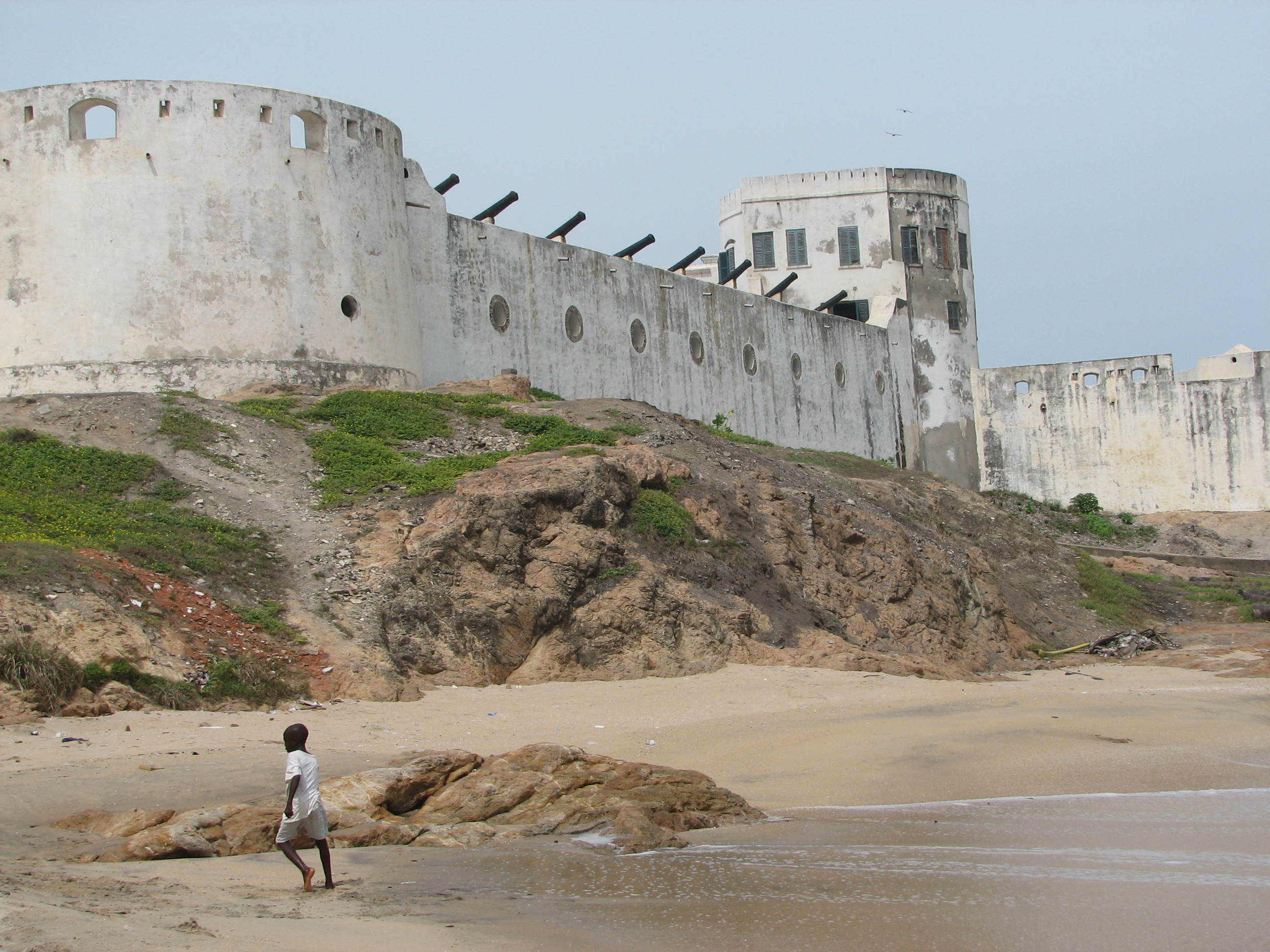
The wall

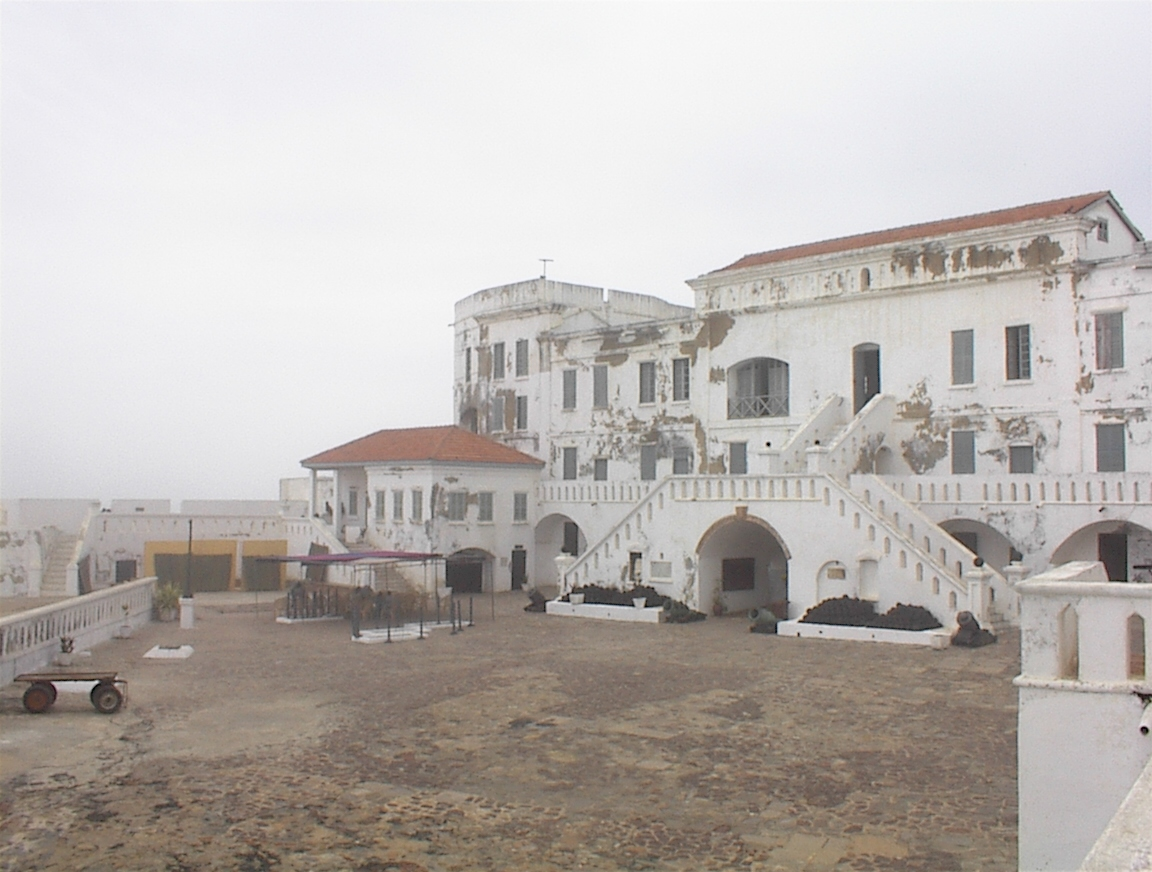
Cape Coast Castle, as rebuilt by the British in the 18th century

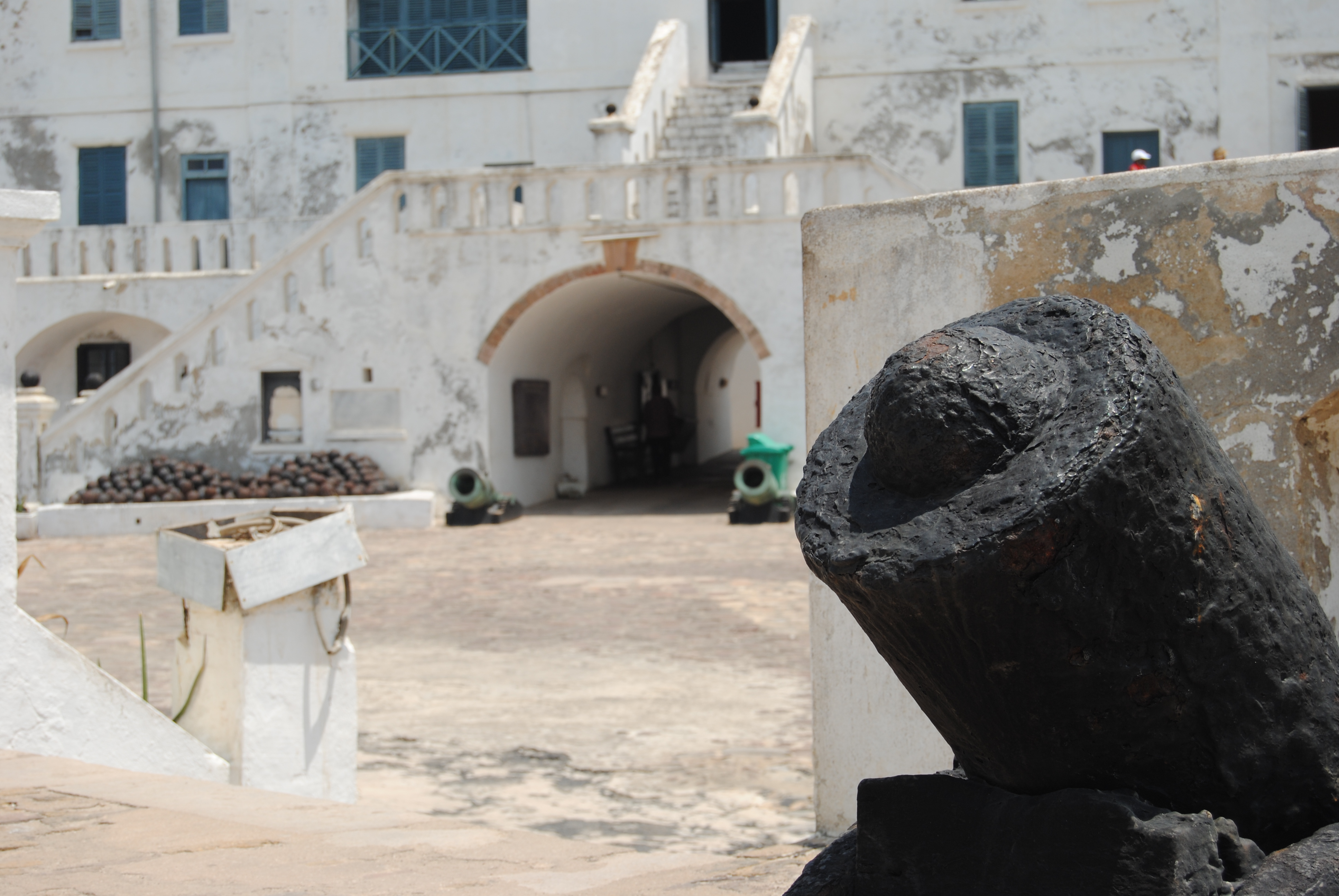
Cape Coast Castle, Ghana

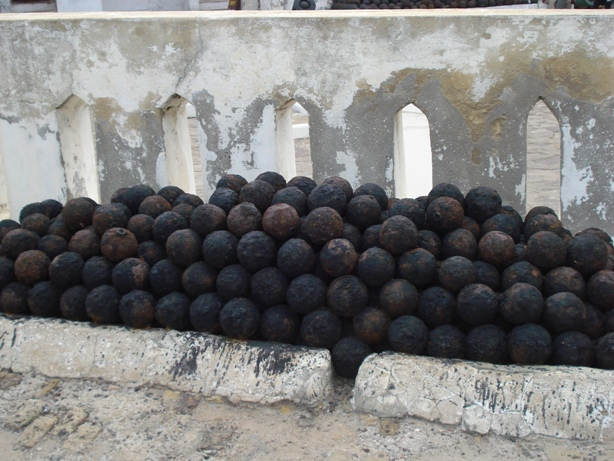
Cannonballs at Cape Coast Castle, a structure used in the Trans-Atlantic Slave Trade.

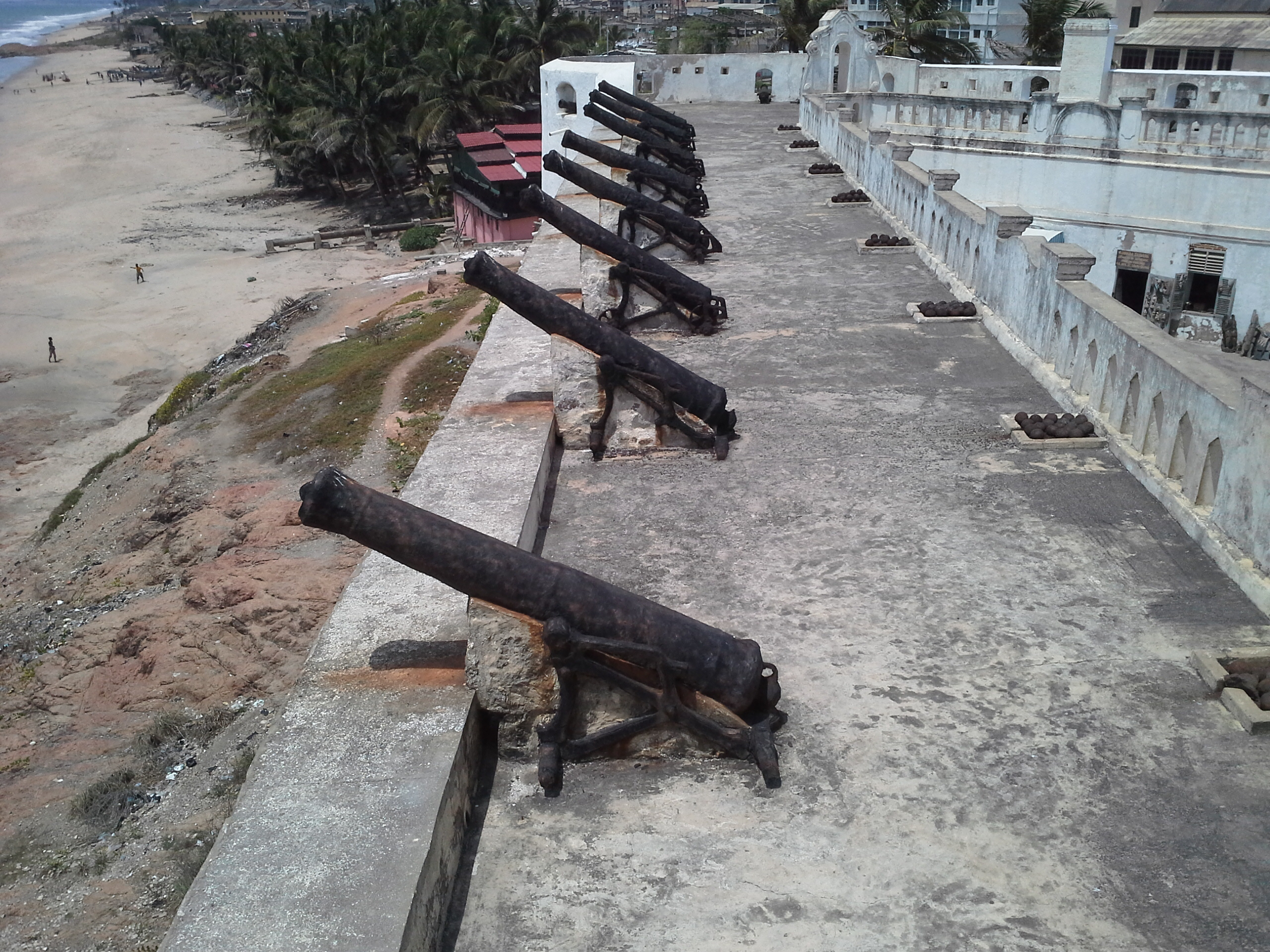
Cape Coast Castle, Ghana

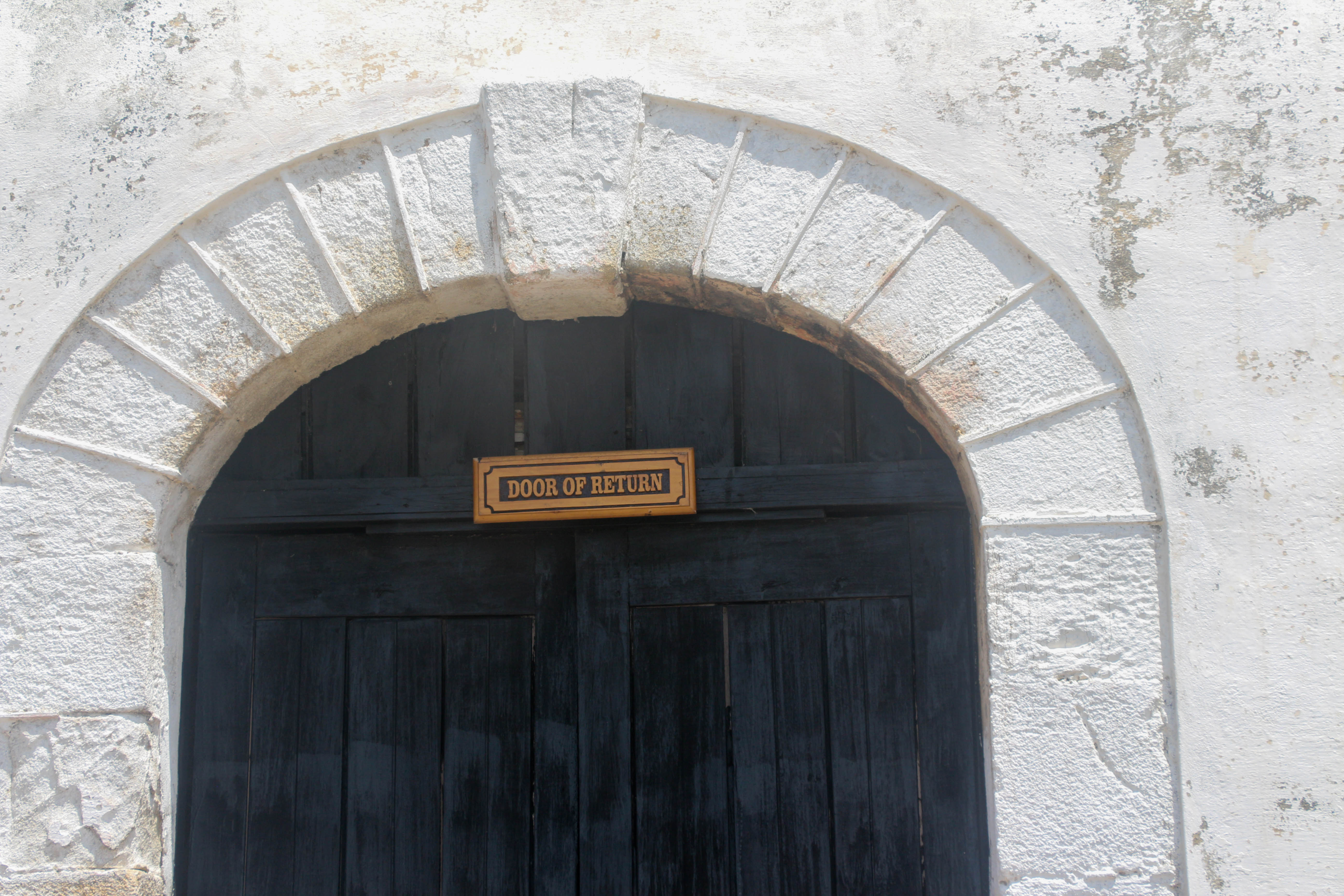
The "Door of Return"

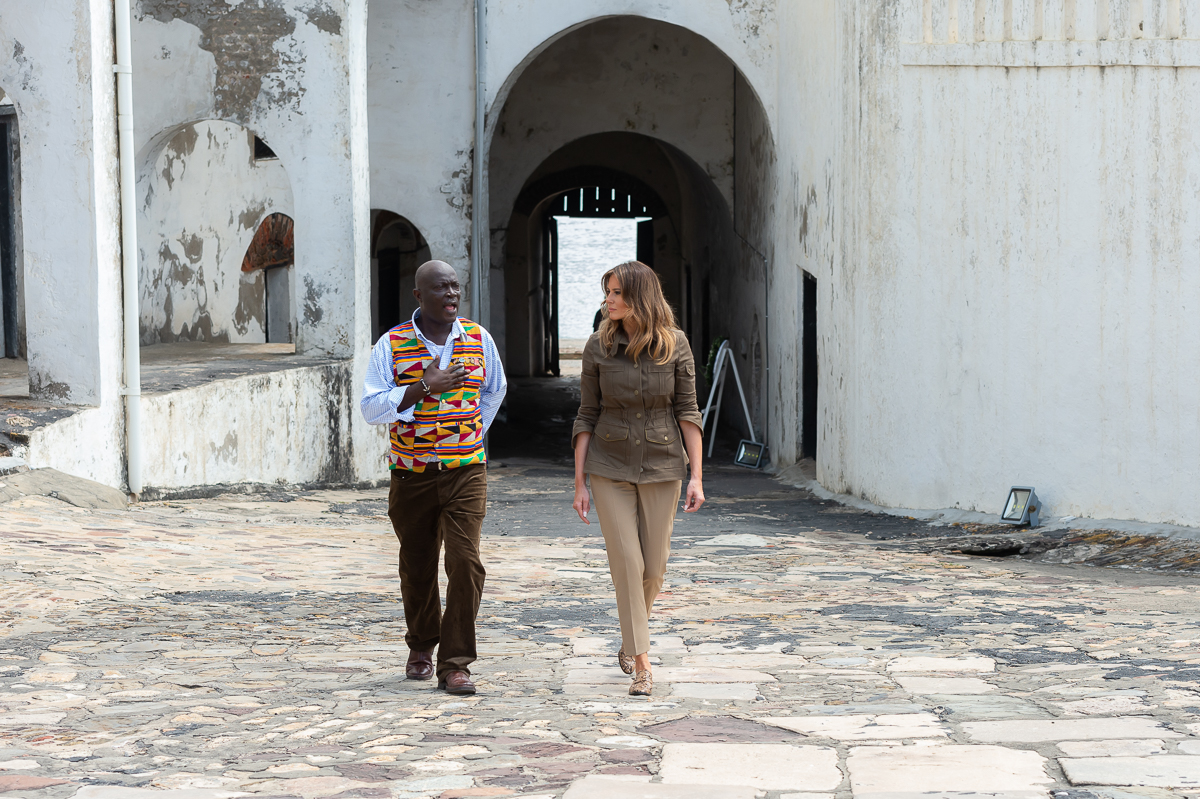
First Lady Melania Trump tours the Cape Coast Castle

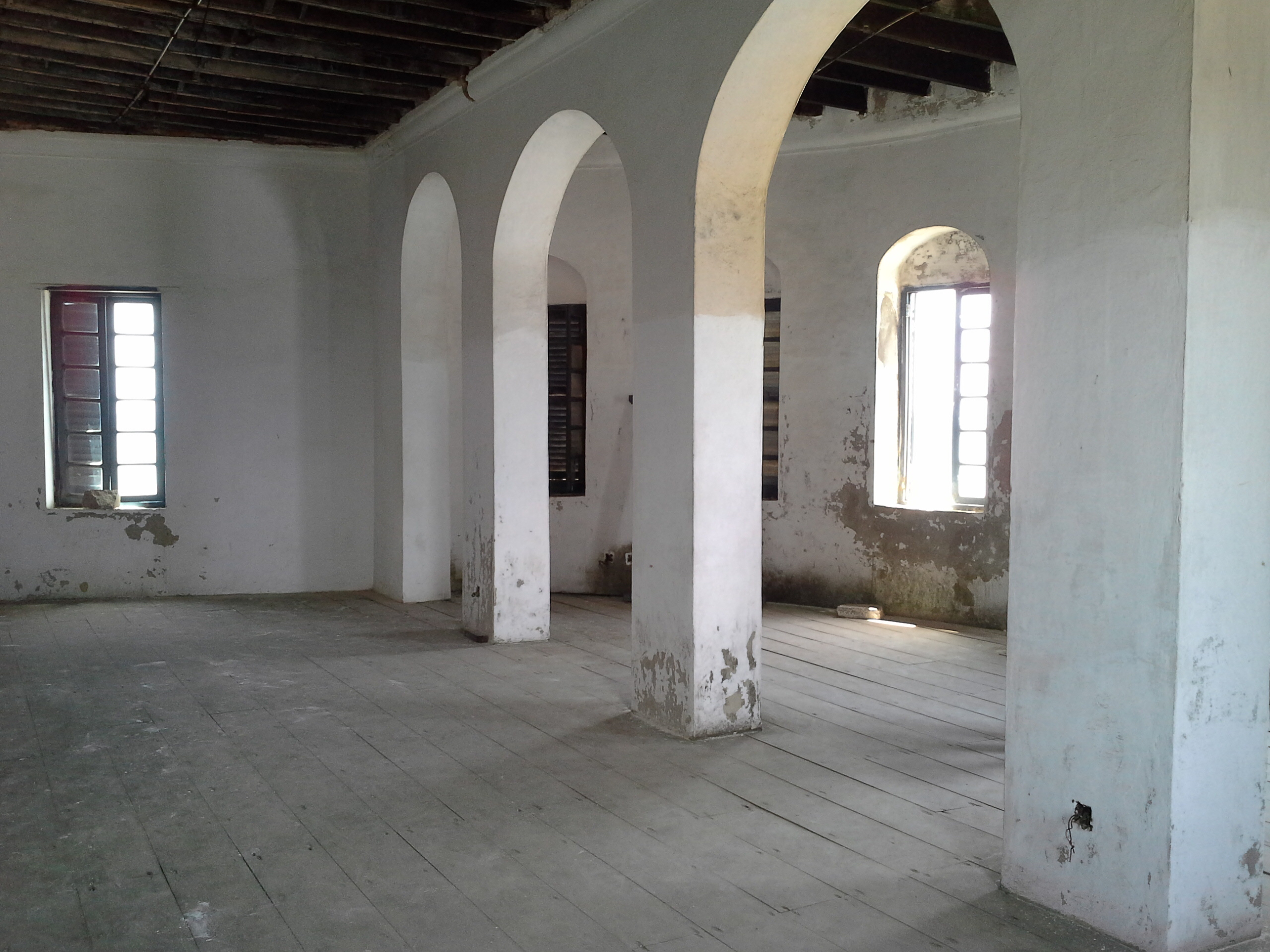
Cape Coast Castle, Ghana

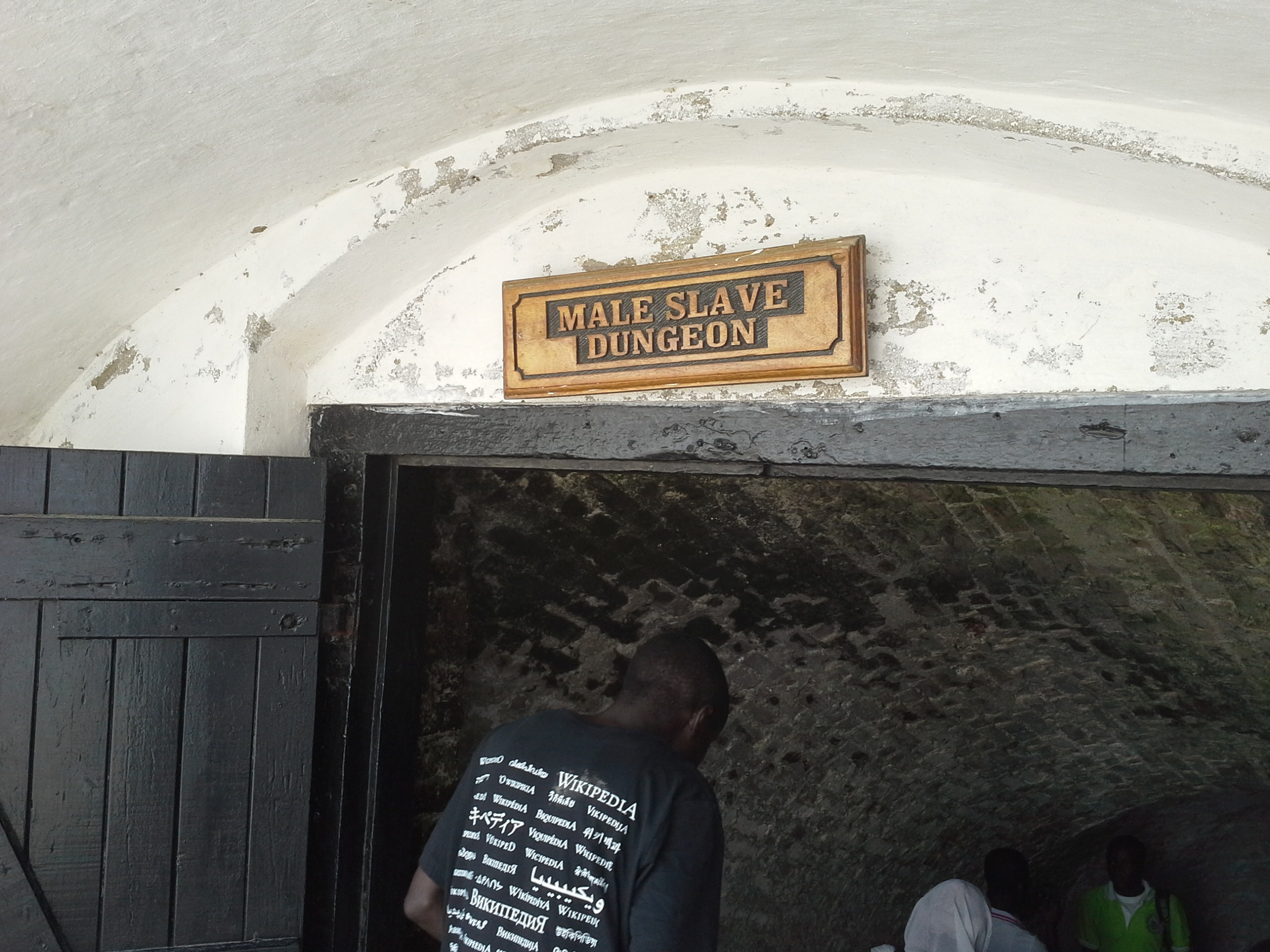
Male Slave Dungeon

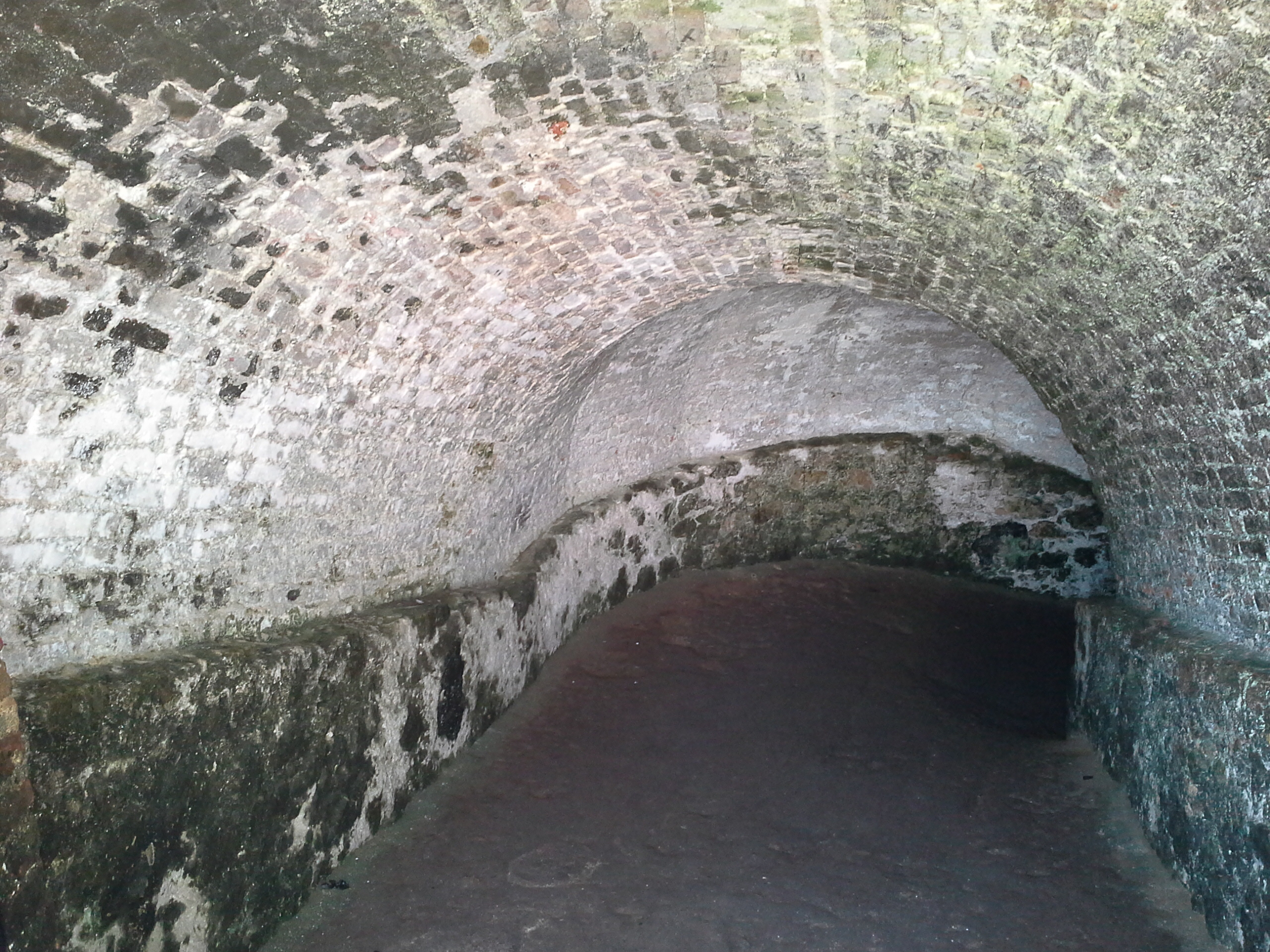
Cape Coast Castle, Ghana

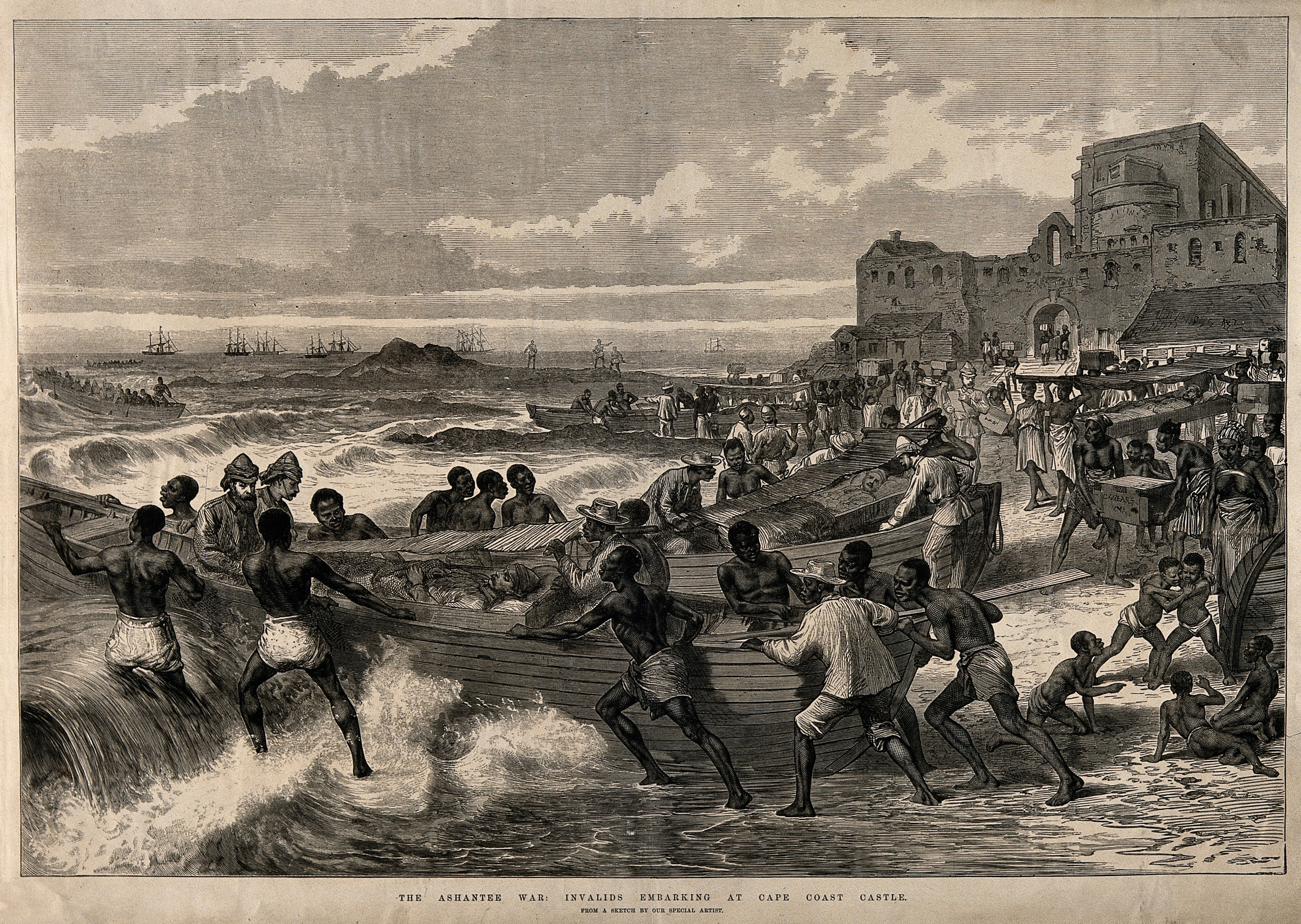
1874, during the Third Anglo-Ashanti war

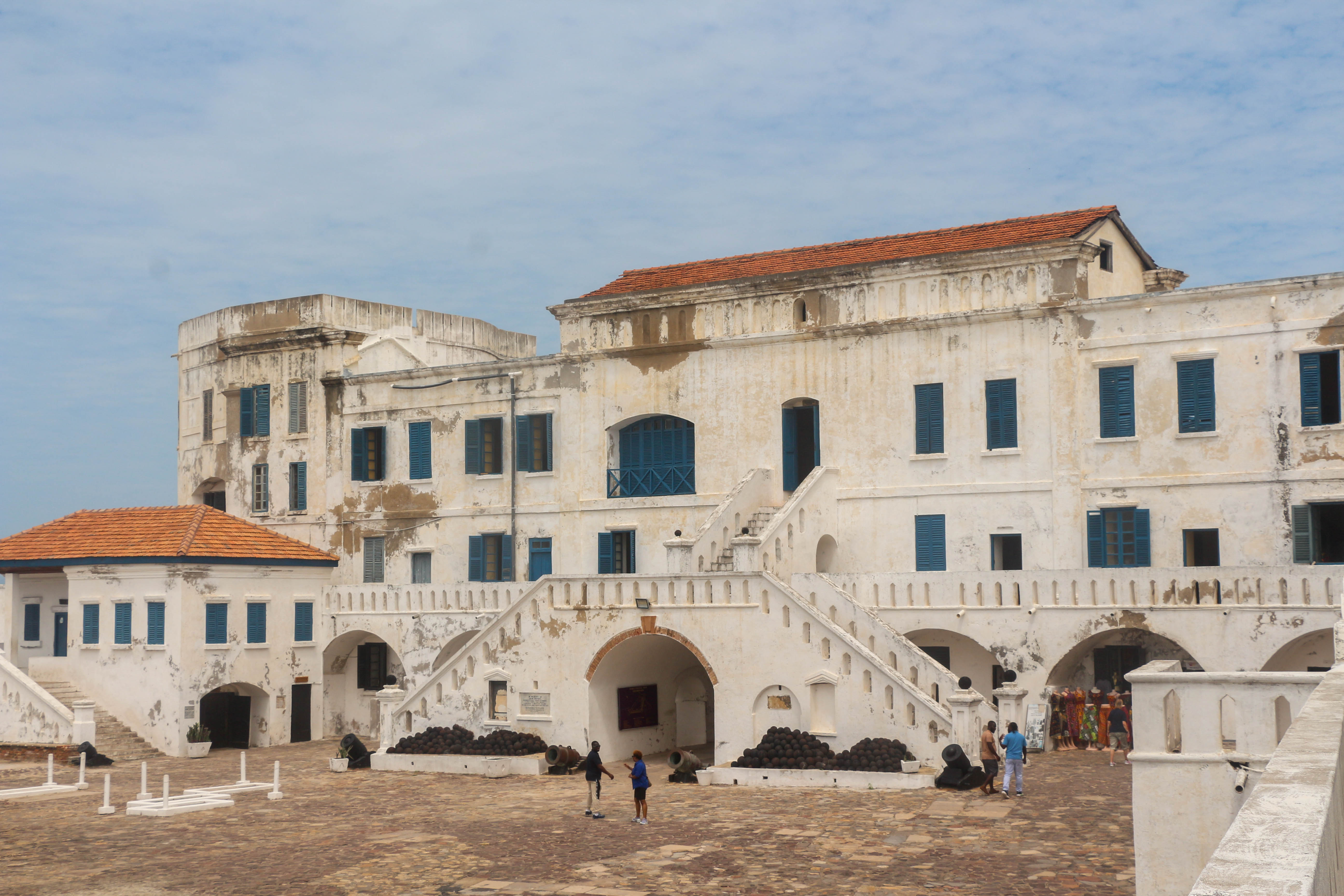
Cape Coast Castle

== See also ==
- Town of Cape Coast, Ghana
- Cape Coast Castle Museum, Cape Coast, Ghana
- List of castles in Ghana

== Sources ==
- Osei-Tutu, Brepong (2004), "African American reactions to the restoration of Ghana's 'slave castles' ", in: Public Archaeology; 3/4, 2004, pp. 195–204. ISSN 1465-5187.
- Shumway, Rebecca (2011), The Fante and the Transatlantic Slave Trade. Rochester: University of Rochester Press. ISBN 9781580463911.
- St. Clair, William (2006), The Grand Slave Emporium: Cape Coast Castle and the British slave trade. London: Profile Books ISBN 1-86197-904-5.
- Van Dantzig, Albert (1999). Forts and Castles of Ghana. Accra: Sedco Publishing. ISBN 9964-72-010-6.
- WorldStatesmen – Ghana
- Watt, Julie (2010). Poisoned Lives: The Regency Poet Letitia Elizabeth Landon (L.E.L.) and British Gold Coast Administrator George Maclean. Sussex Academic Press. ISBN 978-1-84519-420-8.
- Crouch, Nathaniel. 1728. The English Acquisitions in Guinea and East-India. Containing, First, the Several Forts and Castles of the Royal African Company, from Sally in South Barbary, to the Cape of Good-Hope, in Africa, Viz. James Fort, in the River of Gumbo. Sherbrow, in York Island. Serra Leona, in Bence Island. Duckeys Cove. Commenda. Cape Coast Castle. Fort Royal. Anamabo. Winnebab. Acra. Secondly, the Forts and Factories of the Honourable East-India Company in Persia, India, Sumatra, China, &c. Viz. Spawhawa and Gambreon, in Persia Fort St. George. Fort St. David. Conimeere. Cuduloor. Porte Novo. Medapollam. Mereldapatam. Pettipole The Coast of Coromnadel, Carwar. Callicus, Surrat, Bombay Island. Ballasore. Hugly. Chuttanetti. Daca. Rhajama, on the Co. of Mallabar Ascheen, and York Fort, in Somatra. Amoy, Canon, and Tomqueen, in China, &c. With an Account of the Inhabitants of All These Countries; Their Religion, Government, Trade, Marriages, Funerals, Strange Customs, &c. Also, Birds, Beasts, Serpents, Monsters, and Other Strange Creatures Found There Intermixt with Divers Accidents, and Notable Remarks. with Cuts. Likewise, a Description of the Isle of St. Helena, Where the English Usually Refresh in Their India Voyages. By Robert Burton. London: Printed and A. Bettewworthe at the Red Lyon, and J. Battely at the Dove, in Pater-noster-Row.
- Smallwood, Stephanie E. 2008. Saltwater Slavery : A Middle Passage from Africa to American Diaspora. Cambridge, MA ; Harvard University Press. https://doi.org/10.4159/9780674043770.
- St. Clair, William. 2007. The Door of No Return : The History of Cape Coast Castle and the Atlantic Slave Trade. New York, NY: BlueBridge.
- Roberts, John, and Rowland Cotton. 1778. Extracts from an Account of the State of the British Forts, on the Gold Coast of Africa, Taken by Captain Cotton, of His Majesty’s Ship, Pallas, in May, and June, 1777. To Which Are Added, Observations By John Roberts, Governor of Cape Coast Castle, in the Service of the Late Royal African Company of England, for the Management of Their Affairs, on the South Coast of Africa. London: Printed for J. Bew, No. 28, Pater noster Row.
- Vaughan, Robert, and Thomas Carney. 2022. “Considerations on the Present Peace, as Far as It Is Relative to the Colonies, and the African Trade.” Gutenberg.org. 2022. https://www.gutenberg.org/cache/epub/69348/pg69348-images.html.
