= Anthony Musgrave =

British colonial administrator (1828–1888)

Sir Anthony Musgrave GCMG
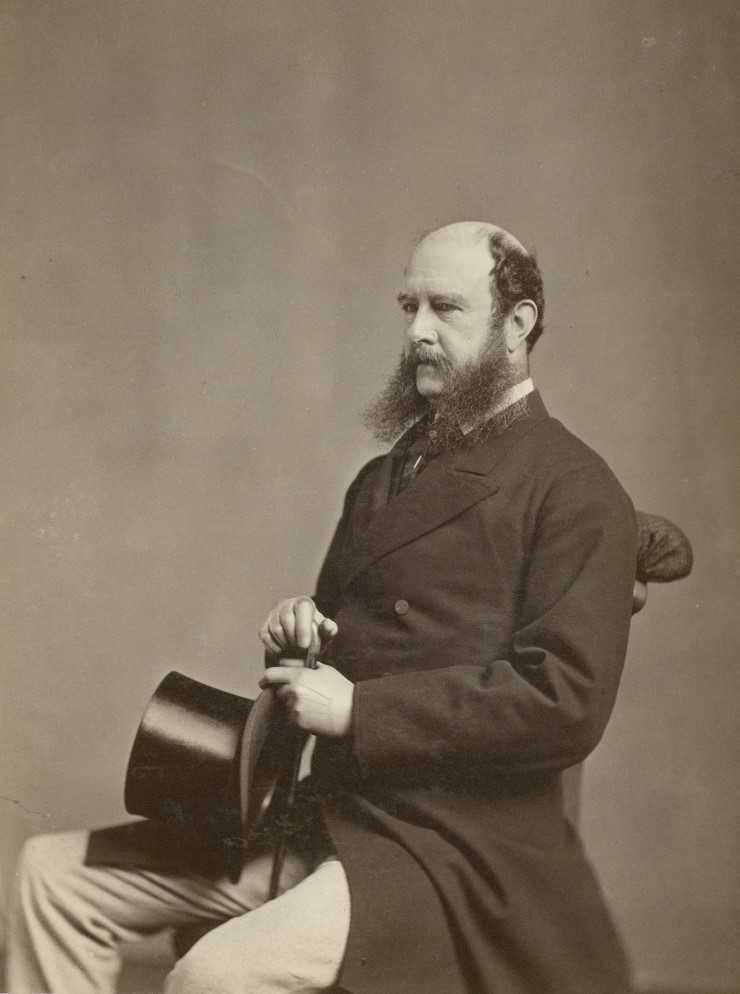

Lieutenant Governor of Saint Vincent
- In office 1862–1864
- Monarch: Victoria
- Preceded by: Edward John Eyre
- Succeeded by: Sir George Berkley

Governor of Newfoundland
- In office 1864–1869
- Monarch: Victoria
- Preceded by: Sir Alexander Bannerman
- Succeeded by: Sir Stephen John Hill

Governor of the Colony of British Columbia
- In office 1869–1871
- Monarch: Victoria
- Preceded by: Frederick Seymour
- Succeeded by: Abolished

Governor of Natal
- In office 1872–1873
- Monarch: Victoria
- Preceded by: Robert Keate
- Succeeded by: Sir Benjamin Pine

Governor of South Australia
- In office 1873–1877
- Monarch: Victoria
- Preceded by: Sir James Fergusson
- Succeeded by: Sir William Jervois

Governor-General of Jamaica
- In office 1877–1883
- Monarch: Victoria
- Preceded by: Sir Edward Rushworth acting
- Succeeded by: Somerset Clarke acting

Governor of Queensland
- In office 1883–1888
- Monarch: Victoria
- Preceded by: Sir Arthur Kennedy
- Succeeded by: Sir Henry Norman

Personal details
- Born: 31 August 1828 St. John's, Colony of Antigua
- Died: 9 October 1888 (aged 60) Brisbane, Colony of Queensland
- Resting place: Toowong Cemetery
- Citizenship: British
- Spouse(s): Christiana Elizabeth Byam; Jeanie Lucinda Field

Viceregal styles of Sir Anthony Musgrave
- Reference style: His Excellency
- Spoken style: Your Excellency

Sir Anthony Musgrave GCMG (31 August 1828 – 9 October 1888) was a colonial administrator and governor. He died in office as Governor of Queensland in 1888.

== Early life ==
He was born in St. John's, Antigua, the third of 11 children of Anthony Musgrave and Mary Harris Sheriff.

After education in Antigua and Great Britain, he was appointed private secretary to Robert James Mackintosh, governor-in-chief of the Leeward Islands, in 1854. He was recognised for his "capacity and zeal", and quickly promoted, administering in turn the British West Indies territories of Nevis and Saint Vincent and the Grenadines.

Musgrave was born to a slaveholding family. His father and uncles were slaveholders who were compensated for their slaves after the abolition of slavery in the 1830s.

== British North America ==
After ten years of colonial service in the Caribbean, Musgrave was appointed governor of Newfoundland in September, 1864. Unlike his previous appointments, Newfoundland had responsible government and an active colonial assembly. He also found a colony in dire economic straits, containing a destitute population. During his tenure, Musgrave dedicated most of energies towards convincing Newfoundland to remedy this by joining the negotiations with other British North American colonies towards union in what would become the Canadian Confederation. In this project, he was allied with the goals of the colonial office. Despite his efforts, and what seemed like imminent success, Musgrave ultimately failed to move the colonial assembly to accepting terms of union. Canada was proclaimed on 1 July 1867, while Newfoundland would not join Confederation for another 82 years.

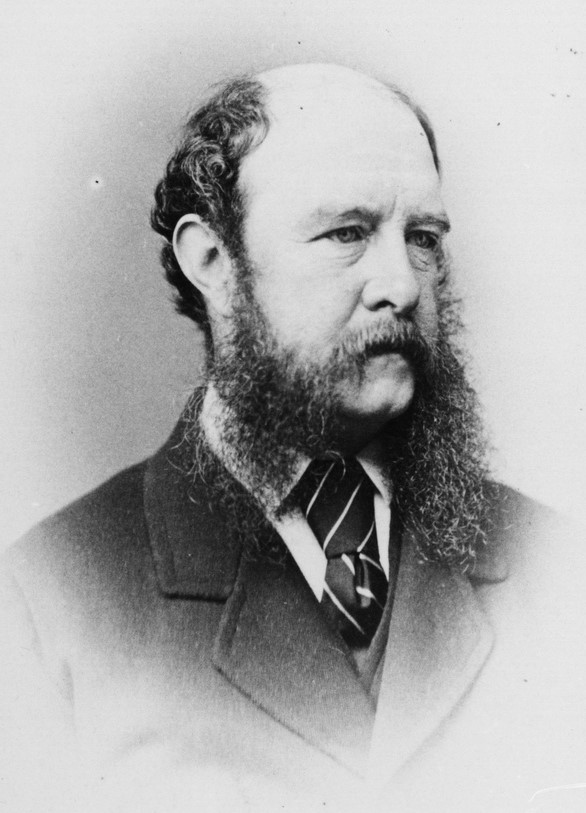

In consultation with the colonial office and the Canadian Prime Minister, John A. Macdonald, it was agreed that Musgrave should redirect his energies concerning the expansion of the Canadian confederation away from the easternmost colony of British North America, to the westernmost—the Colony of British Columbia, which was recently united with the Colony of Vancouver Island. Following the death of Frederick Seymour, Musgrave took up his new responsibilities as colonial governor in August, 1869. Musgrave found a colony in an administrative and financial mess, with a fractious assembly, long-simmering disputes between the two colonies and their capitals – Victoria and New Westminster—and general frustration with the slow pace of negotiations for the colony to enter confederation. Musgrave proved to be both a capable administrator, and an able placater of the assembly's notoriously contentious members. In less than two years, in July, 1871, British Columbia joined Canada as its sixth province.

== Natal ==
Musgrave did a brief stint as governor of the South African colony of Natal.

== South Australia ==
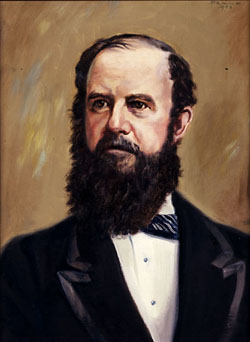

Musgrave's next posting was to South Australia. This proved to be a substantially less taxing appointment. During his tenure, Musgrave supported the assembly in its plans to borrow a large sum for the purpose of extensive railway construction, the imposition of additional taxation, and the introduction of a considerable number of immigrants into what was still a largely unsettled hinterland.

== Jamaica ==
After three and a half years in the Antipodes, Musgrave returned to the Caribbean as governor of Jamaica. He would govern the colony for the next six years, focusing much of his attention on improving its cultural life. Under his administration, the government purchased the Jamaica Railway Company and extended the line. Musgrave also initiated the Jamaica Scholarship, and was instrumental in establishing the Institute of Jamaica, dedicated to fostering and encouraging the development of arts, science, and literature. The Musgrave Medal, awarded by the institute for excellence in these fields, was named in his honour in 1897.

== Queensland ==
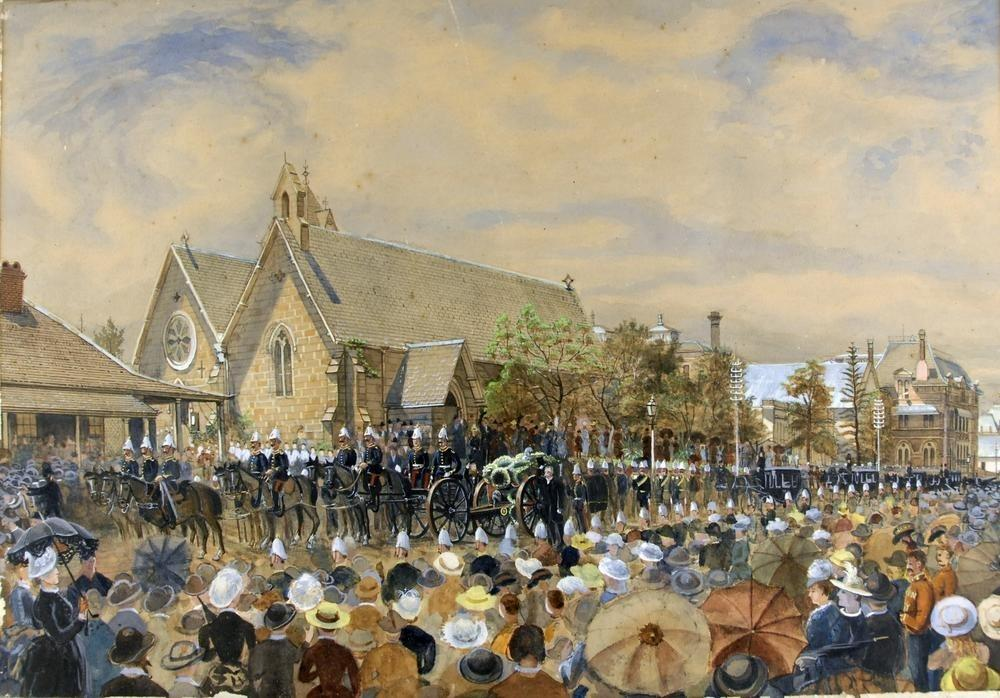
Sir Anthony Musgrave funeral at St John's Pro-Cathedral, 1888

Musgrave's last appointment was back in Australia, as governor of the colony of Queensland, where he arrived on 7 November 1883 in the Ranelagh. Like South Australia, Queensland enjoyed full responsible government, and Musgrave was more of a spectator of the political scene. He travelled with premier Samuel Griffith to visit the northern parts of the colony including Cooktown, Port Douglas, Cairns, Townsville, Charters Towers, Mourilyan Harbour, Cardwell, and Bowen. During this period, he was faced with responding to the action of the colony's premier, Sir Thomas McIlwraith, in "annexing" New Guinea as part of Queensland – an action repudiated by the colonial office.

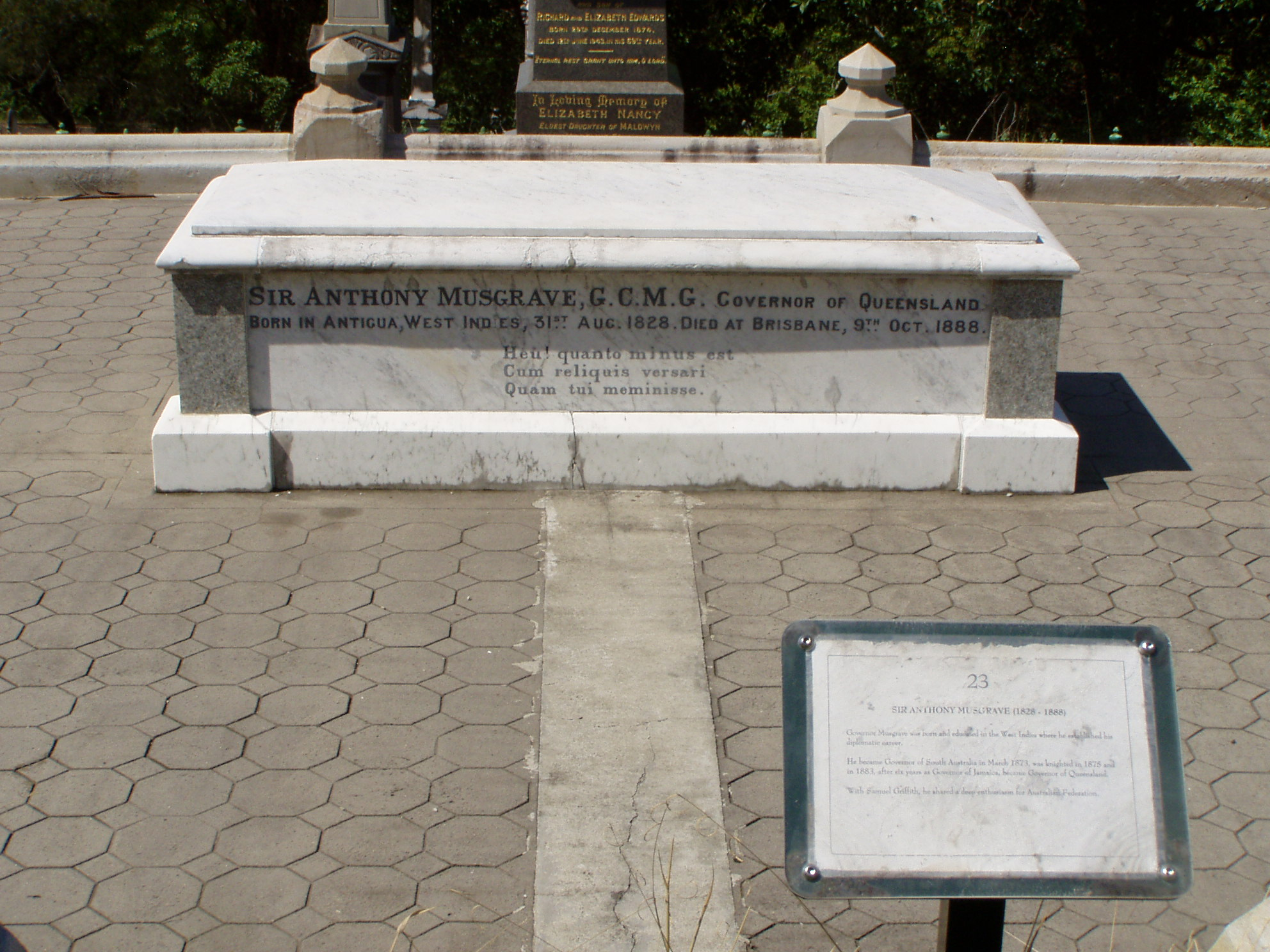
Burial site of Sir Anthony Musgrave at Toowong Cemetery.

Governor Anthony Musgrave was at the point of retiring from the colonial service when he died at his desk in Brisbane on 9 October 1888 from strangulation of the bowel. His funeral was held on 10 October 1888 at St John's Pro-Cathedral, after which he was interred in Brisbane's Toowong General Cemetery on the principal slope near to the grave of Governor Blackall, the location being personally selected by premier Thomas McIlwraith.

In May 1939, his grave was reported as unkempt and overgrown with weeds.

== Family ==
He married in 1854 to Christiana Elizabeth, daughter of the Hon. Sir William Byam of Antigua (she died in 1859). Prior to his tenure in British Columbia, Musgrave married his second wife, Jeanie Lucinda Field (daughter of David Dudley Field) in San Francisco. Their daughter, Joyce, died in South Australia during 1874. According to article in "Air Clues" in May 1995, he also had three sons: Arthur David Musgrave (born 1874, died 1931; served in the Army, ending the war as CRA 52nd Division, retiring as a Brigadier General); Herbert Musgrave DSO RFC and RE (born11 May 1876 in Adelaide, South Australia, died 2 June 1918 in German territory); and Dudley Field Musgrave (born 1873, died 1895 of typhoid fever in Bombay; served in the Royal Navy, reaching Lieutenant).

According to www.biographi.ca Sir Anthony was the 3rd of 11 children.

== Places named for Musgrave and his wife ==
=== Australia ===
Queensland

- Port Musgrave, an embayment located on the northwestern tip of the Cape York Peninsula
- Musgrave Telegraph Station
- Musgrave Hill, a locality in Southport, Gold Coast
- Musgrave Road in Brisbane (from Petrie Terrace through Red Hill)
- The Queensland Government's steam yacht of 1884 was named Lucinda after Lady Musgrave
- Lucinda, Queensland, a small town, now a sugar terminal, near Ingham, Queensland
- Lady Musgrave Island, an island located near the southern end of the Great Barrier Reef
- Lady Musgrave Drive in Mountain Creek, Queensland

South Australia

- The Musgrave Ranges, a mountain range located at the extreme northwestern part of South Australia
- Lucindale, a town named after Lady Musgrave in 1877

=== British Columbia ===
- Musgrave Landing, a locality on the southwest coast of Saltspring Island in the Gulf Islands of southwestern British Columbia
- The Musgrave Peaks (or Musgrave Range), part of the Coast Mountains, located in the Estevan Islands off the north-central coast of British Columbia. Musgrave also helped in the making of British Columbia by assisting in the negotiation in Ottawa.

=== Jamaica ===
- Lady Musgrave Road, a thoroughfare in Kingston, Jamaica named for his wife.
- Musgrave Market, a market in Port Antonio, Portland, Jamaica.

=== Newfoundland ===
- The town of Muddy Hole was renamed Musgrave Harbour in 1886. It is located on central Newfoundland's Kittiwake Coast.
- Musgravetown was founded in 1863, and is located on Bonavista Bay in eastern Newfoundland.
- Mount Musgrave is a 540 m peak of the Long Range Mountains of western Newfoundland.

=== South Africa ===
- The major street Musgrave Road in Durban, KwaZulu-Natal, is named after Musgrave. It is the location of the Musgrave Centre mall, named after the road, rather than the former Lieutenant-Governor.

== See also ==
- Arthurton, South Australia

== Notes ==
Government offices
Preceded by Edward John Eyre	Lieutenant Governor of Saint Vincent; 1862–1864	Succeeded by George Berkeley
Preceded by Sir Alexander Bannerman	Governor of Newfoundland; 1864–1869	Succeeded by Sir Stephen John Hill
Preceded by Frederick Seymour	Governor of the Colony of British Columbia; 1869–1871	Succeeded by Abolished
Preceded by Robert William Keate	Governor of Natal; 1872–1873	Succeeded by Sir Benjamin Pine
Preceded by Right Honourable; Sir James Fergusson, Bt	Governor of South Australia; 1873–1877	Succeeded by Lieutenant General; Sir William F.D. Jervois, GCMG, CB
Preceded by Edward Everard Rushworth Mann, acting	Governor of Jamaica; 1877–1883	Succeeded by Somerset M. Wiseman Clarke, acting
Preceded by Sir Arthur Kennedy	Governor of Queensland; 1883–1888	Succeeded by General Sir Henry Norman
