= William C. F. Robinson =

Irish colonial administrator and musical composer (1834–1897)

Sir William Robinson GCMG FRGS
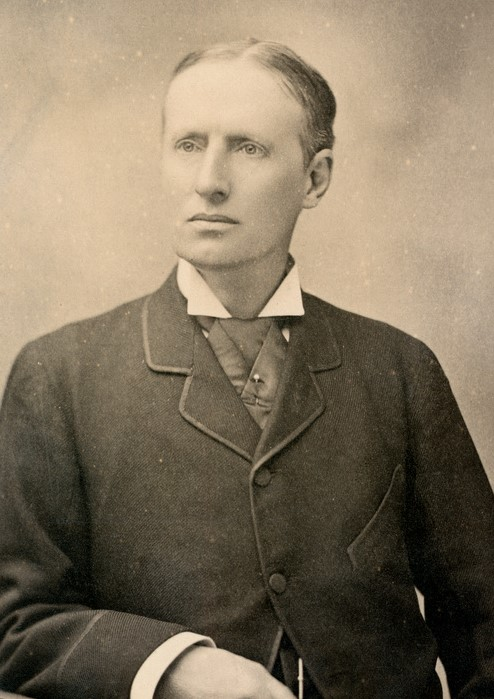

11th Governor of South Australia
- In office 19 February 1883 – 5 March 1889
- Monarch: Victoria
- Premier: John Cox Bray (1883-84); John Colton (1884-85); Sir John Downer (1885-87); Thomas Playford II (1887-89)
- Preceded by: Sir William Jervois
- Succeeded by: The Rt Hon. Earl of Kintore

11th Governor of the Straits Settlements
- In office August 1877 – 10 February 1879
- Monarch: Victoria
- Preceded by: Sir William Jervois
- Succeeded by: Sir Frederick Weld

9th Governor of Western Australia
- In office 11 January 1875 – 11 November 1877
- Preceded by: Frederick Weld
- Succeeded by: Harry Ord
- In office 10 April 1880 – 1 June 1883
- Preceded by: Harry Ord
- Succeeded by: Frederick Broome
- In office 20 October 1890 – 22 December 1895
- Premier: Sir John Forrest
- Preceded by: Frederick Broome
- Succeeded by: Gerard Smith

Governor of the Leedward Islands
- In office 1874–1874
- Preceded by: Henry Turner Irving
- Succeeded by: George Berkeley

19th Lieutenant Governor of Prince Edward Island
- In office 6 October 1870 – November 1873
- Monarch: Victoria
- Governors General: The Lord Lisgar; The Earl of Dufferin
- Premier: James Colledge Pope; Robert Haythorne; Lemuel Owen
- Preceded by: Robert Hodgson
- Succeeded by: Robert Hodgson

Governor of the Falkland Islands
- In office 23 May 1866 – 1870
- Preceded by: James George Mackenzie
- Succeeded by: George Abbas Kooli D'Arcy

Personal details
- Born: 14 January 1834 County Westmeath, Ireland
- Died: 2 May 1897 (aged 63) South Kensington, London
- Spouse: Olivia Edith Dean (m. 1862)
- Children: 5
- Parents: Hercules Robinson (father); Frances Elizabeth Wood (mother)
- Occupation: musical composer, colonial administrator
- Profession: Politician

Sir William Cleaver Francis Robinson GCMG FRGS (14 January 1834 – 2 May 1897) was an Irish colonial administrator and musical composer, who wrote several well-known songs. He was born in County Westmeath, Ireland, and was educated at home and at the Royal Naval School. He joined the Colonial Office service in 1858 and became the president of Montserrat in 1862.

He married Olivia Edith Deane in 1862. He began serving as governor of the Falkland Islands in May 1866 and governed Prince Edward Island from 1870–1873, helping the island join a union with Canada. He became the governor of the Leeward Islands in 1874 and served his first term as the Western Australia governor from 1875–1877.

He was appointed governor of the Straits Settlements in 1877 and served as governor of Western Australia a second term from April 1880 to February 1883. Robinson became the governor of South Australia in 1883 until 1889. He was a temporary governor of Victoria, Australia in 1889, but was unable to be appointed permanently. He served his third term as governor of Western Australia from 1890–1895. He retired from his career in March 1895, at age 61. He then travelled to England and died on 2 May 1897, in South Kensington, London.

== Early life ==
Robinson was born at Rosmead in County Westmeath, Ireland, on 14 January 1834 to Admiral Hercules Robinson, a naval officer, and Frances Elizabeth Wood, as their fourth son. He received his education at both his home in Rosmead and at the Royal Naval School in New Cross, Surrey. He was described as tall and slim, in comparison to his more athletic brother, Hercules Robinson, 1st Baron Rosmead (born Hercules George Robert), whom he "lived somewhat in the shadow of."

== Early career (1858–1883) ==
In 1858, when he was 21 years old, Robinson entered the service of the Colonial Office as a private secretary to Hercules, who was Lieutenant Governor of St. Kitts at the time. Robinson accompanied Hercules as a private secretary again in 1859 when Hercules became the governor of Hong Kong.

In 1862, William became the president of the island of Montserrat in the West Indies. This was his first time being appointed as a viceroy. On 7 April 1862, Robinson married Olivia Edith Deane, the daughter of bishop Thomas Townsend. Robinson was an administrator of the government in Dominica from January 1865 to October 1865. He became the commander-in-chief and governor of the Falkland Islands on 23 May 1866 and held office there until 1870, later recounting the country and its settlement as a "remote settlement at the fag end of the world," due to its very small population.

On 5 July 1870, Robinson was appointed the 19th Lieutenant Governor of Prince Edward Island, and kept this position until November 1873. While Robinson was governing the island, it was attempting to join a union along with the other British colonies in North America, after having been a separate colony for over a hundred years. Many of the politicians in the colony objected to the union; the country had been in this fixed position since 1865. Robinson's primary goal as governor was to help the island become a part of the union. After observing the politics in the island for a few months, he became sure that financial necessity would be the only way for the union to be accepted.

Robinson believed that a good way to carry this out would be to build a railway. He was able to convince James Colledge Pope to pass a railway act in April 1871. In October 1871, the railway started to be built, and in September the next year, Robinson stated that "with the Railway debt upon their shoulders . . . the majority of the people will before long give their voices in favor of Confederation." He reported again in September 1871 that the island would be able to join the union in several months. Robert Poore Haythorne, the premier of the island, was finally compelled to consult the Canadians regarding the union in February 1873. The island became a part of the Dominion of Canada on 1 July 1873. Robinson was made a Companion of the Order of St Michael and St George (CMG) the same year for completing this task, the day when the island united with the dominion. He ended his term in November 1873, his mission accomplished. Robert Hodgson was his successor.

Robinson became the governor of the Leeward Islands in 1874. He was appointed Governor of Western Australia on 14 November 1874, and served from 11 January 1875 until 6 September 1877. Afterwards, Robinson was made governor of the Straits Settlements, a group of British territories in Southeast Asia whose headquarters were in Singapore, in 1877. He was made a Knight Commander of the Order of St Michael and St George (KCMG) the same year. Robinson travelled to Bangkok in 1878, so that he could provide the Knight Grand Cross of St Michael and St George to the King of Siam, and he subsequently received the Grand Cross of the Order of the Crown of Siam.

Shortly after returning, Robinson was made governor of Natal; however, he was replaced by the British Government before he was able to serve. He served a second term as governor of Western Australia from 10 April 1880 to 17 February 1883. Throughout this period, Robinson discovered that he had little power as governor of Western Australia and found it difficult to control the government, hindering his performance as governor. "Let no man take charge of such a form of government who is not as patient as Job, as industrious as a Chinaman, and as ubiquitous as a provincial mayor in France," he said to his colleagues. However, he developed a reputation of good administration and cooperation with leaders in London who were higher ranked than himself, which helped him with his future appointment as South Australia governor when this term ended.

== Later career (1883–1895) ==
Robinson served as the governor of South Australia, beginning in February 1883; the song "Unfurl the Flag", which he had composed, was played during his inauguration in Adelaide. Due to few important political events occurring in the late 1880s and the fact much of the political power was within the Premier and the legislative assembly, Robinson had little to do as governor, making his role primarily needed solely for symbolic and social purposes.

Robinson was passionate about music, playing the violin, piano, and singing. Throughout his time as governor of South Australia, he was involved with music-related groups. Robinson organised the Adelaide Jubilee International Exhibition in 1887 and was largely responsible for instituting the Bachelor of Music course at the University of Adelaide. He had composed multiple songs previously in his life, including "Imperfectus", "I love thee so", "Remember me no more", "Severed", and "Thou art my Soul", which by this point had become well known in Australia. Robinson also composed a whole comic opera, which was presented at the Princess Theatre in Melbourne, Victoria. Performing in a variety of different events throughout the 1880s, he entertained the most people at Government House of any Australian governor.

In addition to composing music, Robinson was a part of literary and educational groups in Australia. The Physical Geography of the South-West of Western Australia, a paper he wrote and had published in 1886, was read to the Royal Geographical Society of Australasia, as well as On Duty in Many Lands, which was published in 1884. Robinson was also a public speaker. He departed from Adelaide in 1889.

Robinson was promoted to Knight Grand Cross of the Order of St Michael and St George (GCMG) on 24 May 1887. Also in 1887, he turned down a request for his governorship of Hong Kong, as he did not want to undergo its harsh climate. During 1889, from 9 March to November, while Henry Brougham Loch was away, he acted as governor of Victoria, Australia, but was never officially appointed to the position permanently. Due to Robinson's success as temporary governor, the Leader of the Opposition and the Premier were planning to request for Robinson to become the next governor once Loch's governorship concluded, but Lord Hopetoun was appointed before they got the chance. A new divergence had been taken up by the British Government, giving highly ranked positions in the government to noblemen who were inexperienced, which annoyed Robinson. Shortly afterwards, Robinson rejected the governorship of Mauritius.

After his temporary governorship of Victoria, Robinson travelled to London, England. There he assisted the delegation of Western Australia and the Colonial Office by helping pass the constitution bill through parliament. In September 1890, he went to Perth, Western Australia. Robinson became the governor of Western Australia for a third time in October 1890; his return was praised enthusiastically by the citizens. According to the Australian Dictionary of National Biography, "he knew and understood more about Western Australia than any other imperial officer." Robinson chose John Forrest to be the first Premier of Western Australia. Robinson had little to do involving politics as governor, due to the fact that Forrest was dominant over the cabinet and parliament, as well as because of constitutional conventions. His time as governor included the transition of the colony to self-governance in 1890. Robinson was offered the position of the colony's first agent general by Forrest 1891; however, he declined the offer.

== Retirement and death ==
Robinson retired from his governing career in March 1895, when he was 61 years old. Thereafter, he travelled to London and became the director of many companies. Robinson died on 2 May 1897, two years after his retirement, in South Kensington, London, within the 5 Cromwell Houses, which he resided in. At the time of his death, he and his wife had two daughters and three sons. He had £84,058 (equivalent to £9,034,133 in 2023) estate money left after his death. The Times wrote the following in his obituary:

A great deal has been said and can be said in favour of the new type of colonial governor, the peer of high position or political eminence. . . . If, however, there was wanted a vindication of the old class of viceroy, one would not have to go beyond Sir William Robinson to find it.

== Honours ==
- Companion of the Order of St Michael and St George (C.M.G), 1873
- Knight Commander of the Order of St Michael and St George (K.C.M.G), 1877
- Knight Grand Cross of the Order of St Michael and St George (G.C.M.G), 1887

In central Perth, Robinson Avenue, Robinson Road and Cleaver Street were named after Robinson (whose second name was Cleaver).

In the Pilbara region of Western Australia, the natural harbour Port Robinson (also known as Anketell Port), and the townsite of Cleaverville (gazetted, but never occupied), as well as Cleaverville Creek were named after Robinson.

Government offices
Preceded by Capt. James George Mackenzie	Governor of the Falkland Islands; 1866–1870	Succeeded by Colonel George Abbas Kooli D'Arcy
Preceded by Sir Robert Hodgson	Lieutenant Governor of Prince Edward Island; 1870–1873	Succeeded by Sir Robert Hodgson
Preceded by Sir Henry Turner Irving	Governor of Leeward Islands; 1874	Succeeded by Sir George Berkeley
Preceded by Sir Frederick Weld	Governor of Western Australia; 1875–1877	Succeeded by Major-General Sir Harry Ord
Preceded by Sir William Jervois	Governor of the Straits Settlements; 1877–1879	Succeeded by Sir Frederick Aloysius Weld
Preceded by Major-General Sir Harry Ord	Governor of Western Australia; 1880–1883	Succeeded by Sir Frederick Broome
Preceded by Lieutenant General Sir William F.D. Jervois	Governor of South Australia; 1883–1889	Succeeded by Algernon Hawkins Thomond Keith-Falconer
Preceded by Sir Frederick Broome	Governor of Western Australia; 1890–1895	Succeeded by Lieutenant-Colonel Sir Gerard Smith
