= Baron Rosmead =

Extinct barony in the Peerage of the United Kingdom

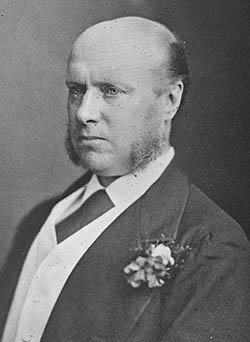
Hercules Robinson, 1st Baron Rosmead.

Baron Rosmead, of Rosmead in the County of Westmeath and of Tafelberg in South Africa, was a title in the Peerage of the United Kingdom. It was created on 11 August 1896 for the colonial administrator Sir Hercules Robinson, 1st Baronet. He had already been created a Baronet, of Ennismore Gardens in the Parish of St Margaret, Westminster, in the County of London, in the Baronetage of the United Kingdom on 6 February 1891. The titles became extinct on the death of his son, the second Baron, in 1933.

Several other members of the Robinson family also gained distinction. Hercules Robinson, father of the first Baron, was an admiral in the Royal Navy. Sir Henry Robinson, brother of the first Baron, was vice-president of the Local Government Board in Ireland between 1879 and 1891. Sir William Cleaver Francis Robinson, brother of the first Baron, was also a prominent colonial administrator. Frederick Charles Robinson, brother of the first Baron, was a vice-admiral in the Royal Navy. Loftus Christopher Hawker Robinson, brother of the first Baron, was a captain in the Royal Navy. Sir Bryan Robinson, uncle of the first Baron, was a judge of the Supreme Court of Newfoundland between 1858 and 1877. Christopher Robinson, grandfather of the first Baron, was a judge of the King's Bench of Ireland. Bryan Robinson, great-grandfather of the first Baron, was Regius Professor of Physic at Trinity College, Dublin.

== Barons Rosmead (1896) ==
- Hercules George Robert Robinson, 1st Baron Rosmead (1824–1897)
- Hercules Arthur Temple Robinson, 2nd Baron Rosmead (1866–1933)

== Arms ==
Coat of arms of Baron Rosmead
Crest Out of a crown vallory Or a mount Vert thereon a buck as in the arms. Escutcheon Vert a chevron engrailed between three bucks at gaze Or each charged on the shoulder with a fleur-de-lis Azure. Supporters Dexter an ostrich reguardant Proper sinister a kangaroo reguardant Proper. Motto Legi Regi Fidus (Faithful To The Law And The King)

== Society events ==
Both the first and future second Barons Rosmead attended the wedding of Nora Robinson and Alexander Kirkman Finlay on 7 August 1878 in St James' Church, Sydney. The first Baron was the father of the bride and the second, her brother, aged 12 at the time. The wedding attracted much attention from the colony's population and press and was attended by all the local dignitaries.

Baronetage of the United Kingdom
Preceded by Petit baronets	Robinson baronets of Rosmead; 6 February 1890	Succeeded by Rawlinson baronets
