= Edward Rushworth =

Edward Rushworth may refer to:

- Edward Rushworth (colonial administrator) (1818–1877), British colonial administrator
- Edward Rushworth (politician) (1755–1817), British politician
