= Stephen John Hill =

British colonial statesmen

Sir Stephen John Hill KCMG CB
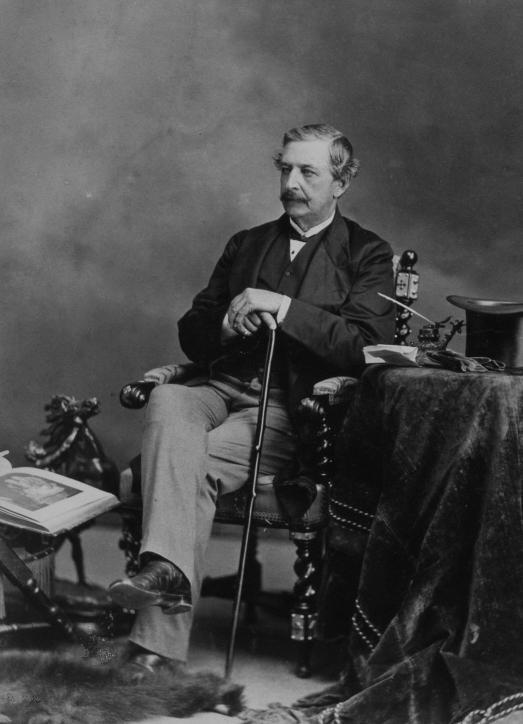
- Hill in 1870

Governor of the Gold Coast
- In office 1851–1854
- Preceded by: James Bannerman
- Succeeded by: Henry Connor

Governor of Sierra Leone
- In office 1854–1863
- Preceded by: Sir Arthur Kennedy
- Succeeded by: Robert Dougan

Governor of Antigua
- In office 1863–1869
- Preceded by: Ker Baillie-Hamilton
- Succeeded by: Sir Benjamin Pine

Governor of Newfoundland
- In office 1869–1876
- Preceded by: Sir Anthony Musgrave
- Succeeded by: Sir John Glover

Personal details
- Born: 10 June 1809 West Indies
- Died: 20 October 1891 (aged 82) London, England

Viceregal styles of Sir Stephen John Hill
- Reference style: His Excellency
- Spoken style: Your Excellency

Sir Stephen John Hill, KCMG CB, (10 June 1809 – 20 October 1891) was a governor of, in turn, four British colonial possessions.

Born in the West Indies, Hill began his colonial service in Africa, becoming governor of the Gold Coast (modern Ghana) in 1851. In 1854 he became governor of Sierra Leone. From 1860 through 1861 he was made governor of Sierra Leone for a second time. Then in 1863 he was appointed governor of the Leeward Islands and Antigua. In 1869 Hill became governor of Newfoundland, continuing in that position until 1876. He provided valuable guidance to the colony during the period following its rejection of participation in Canadian Confederation. Hill took up residency in Anguilla in November 1885 and left in February 1888.

Hill died in 1891 in London, England.

== See also ==
- Governors of Newfoundland
- List of people of Newfoundland and Labrador
- List of colonial governors of Sierra Leone

Government offices
Preceded by James Bannerman	Governor of the Gold Coast; 1851–1854	Succeeded by Henry Connor
Preceded by Sir Arthur Edward Kennedy	Governor of Sierra Leone; 1854–1863	Succeeded by Robert Dougan
Preceded by Ker Baillie Hamilton	Governor of Antigua; 1863–1869	Succeeded by Sir Benjamin Chilley Campbell Pine
Preceded by Sir Anthony Musgrave	Governor of Newfoundland; 1869–1876	Succeeded by Sir John Hawley Glover
