= Governor Berkeley =

Governor Berkeley may refer to:

- George Berkeley (civil servant) (1819–1905), Governor of the Leeward Islands in 1864 and Governor of the West Africa Settlements from 1873 to 1874
- Henry Spencer Berkeley (1851–1918), Acting Governor of Fiji in 1889
- Norborne Berkeley, 4th Baron Botetourt (died 1770), Colonial Governor of Virginia from 1768 to 1770
- William Berkeley (governor) (1605–1677), Colonial Governor of Virginia from 1660 to 1677
