= Alexander Chudinov =

Russian historian

Alexander Tchoudinov
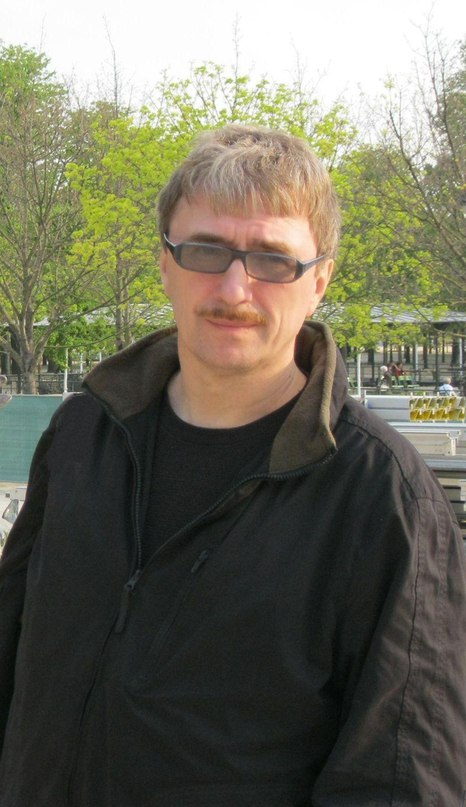
- Born: January 4, 1961 (age 65); Arkhangelsk, RSFSR, USSR
- Education: Moscow State Pedagogical University
- Occupation: historian
- Organization(s): Institute of World History, Russian Academy of Sciences
- Awards: N.I. Kareev Award (2018), le Prix Anatole Leroy-Beaulieu (2010), Silver medal of Renaissance Française for services in the field of Francophonie (2018)

Alexandr Viktorovich Chudinov (Russian: Александр Викторович Чудинов) is a Russian historian and researcher at the Institute of World History, Russian Academy of Sciences. Chudinov is a specialist in the history of the French Revolution, Napoleonic Wars, social thinking of France, as well as the international relations of Britain and Russia. He has been a member of the International Commission on the History of the French Revolution since 2005. Chudinov is one of the authors of the Great Russian Encyclopedia and The Cambridge History of the Napoleonic Wars.

== Biography ==
In 1978, Chudinov graduated from school No.6 in Arkhangelsk, where he studied history under V. D. Ivanov. In the same year, he entered the history and philology department of the Arkhangelsk State Pedagogical Institute. In 1980, he transferred to the Moscow State Pedagogical University. He attended a special seminar on the history of social thought under the supervision of G. S. Kucherenko. After completing his studies in 1984, he was employed at the Institute of General History of the USSR Academy of Sciences (now the Institute of World History, Russian Academy of Sciences).

In 1988, he defended his dissertation:"Socio-political views of J. Mackintosh and the Great French Revolution", becoming the Candidate of Sciences in Historical Sciences.

In the 1980s and early 1990s, Chudinov specialized in the history of English social thought of the 18th–19th centuries (the works of Edmund Burke, William Godwin, James Mackintosh, Thomas Paine, etc.) and the influence of the French Revolution. The results of these studies were summed up in a doctoral dissertation in 1997 entitled: "Reflections of the English on the French Revolution: E. Burke, J. Mackintosh, W. Godwin". Since the late 1980s, Chudinov has also been active in study of problems in historiography of the French Revolution and the Napoleonic Wars.

In 1988, he organized a round table titled "Current Problems of Studying the History of the Great French Revolution", which marked the gradual departure of most Russian historians of the French Revolution from the Marxist tradition.

In the 1990s, Chudinov studied French utopian thought of the 18th and 19th centuries, and in particular the political ideas of the Robespierrists (Maximilien Robespierre, Louis Antoine de Saint-Just, and Georges Couthon), who, in his opinion, attempted to implement the utopian ideal in practice during Reign of Terror,. In 1995, he held a round table titled "Jacobinism in the Historical Results of the Great French Revolution".

In the 1990s, together with Dmitry Bovikin and other historians of the "new Russian school", Chudinov carried out a conceptual historiographical turn associated with the rejection of the predominantly Marxist perspective of the French Revolution as a transition from feudalism to capitalism, clearly manifested at the round table "The French Revolution of the 18th Century and the Bourgeoisie" (2001). The new paradigm he formulated presupposes the rejection of an unambiguous perspective of the French Revolution and its heroes.

Since 2000, Chudinov is editor-in-chief of the international academic periodical French Annual. In 2018, he was awarded the Silver medal of Renaissance Française for services in the field of Francophonie.

In the 2000s, in addition to the problems of the French Revolution, Chudinov developed various aspects of the history of Franco-Russian relations during The Age of Enlightenment, in particular the activities of French governors in Russia. He initiated and participated in a number of relevant international projects, the interim results of which were summed up at the conference "French-speaking governor in Europe XVII-XIX centuries" in 2009.

In 2010–2014, Chudinov headed the Marc Bloch Franco-Russian Center for Historical Anthropology in the Russian State University for the Humanities, proposed using methods of historical anthropology to study the mentality of Russian peasants during the Patriotic War of 1812, primarily their archetypal representations of the image of the enemy. In 2011 he held a round table «The Patriotic War of 1812: current issues of modern historiography»

In 2014–2019, Chudinov headed the Department of Historical Regional Studies at the State Academic University for the Humanities.

In 2018, he was awarded the N.I. Kareev Award for a series of scientific works on the history of the French Revolution and the Napoleonic Wars.

Since 2014, Chudinov has been running a Laboratory "World during the French Revolution and the Napoleonic Wars" and specializing mainly in the study of popular movements against the forced affirmation of the value system of the French Revolution in regions with a dominant traditional culture in particular in Egypt and Italy.

== Scientific works ==
=== Monographs ===
- Политическая справедливость Уильяма Годвина. М.: Знание, 1990. 64 с.
- У истоков революционного утопизма. М.: Знание, 1991. 64 с.
- Размышления англичан о Французской революции: Э. Бёрк, Дж. Макинтош, У. Годвин. М.: Памятники исторической мысли, 1996. 301 с.
- Французская революция: история и мифы. М.: Наука, 2007. 310 с.
- Жильбер Ромм и Павел Строганов: История необычного союза. М.: Новое литературное обозрение, 2010. 344 с.
- Le Précepteur francophone en Europe (XVIIe-XIXe siècles) / Sous dir. de V. Rjéoutski et A. Tchoudinov. P.: L’Harmattan, 2013. 433 p. (в соавторстве).
- Écrire l’histoire par temps de guerre froide : Soviétiques et Français autour de la crise de l’Ancien Régime / Sous la dir. de S. Aberdam et A. Tchoudinov. P. : Société des études robespierristes, 2014. 312 p. (в соавторстве).
- История Французской революции: пути познания. М.: Политическая энциклопедия, 2017. 280 с.
- Старый порядок во Франции и его крушение. СПб.: Наука, 2017. 205 с.
- Забытая армия. Французы в Египте после Бонапарта. 1799–1800. М.: Политическая энциклопедия, 2019. 383 с.
- «Принц» и «цареубийца». История Павла Строганова и Жильбера Ромма. М.: АСТ, 2020. 304 с.
- Французская революция. М.: Альпина нон-фикшн, 2020. 468 с. (в соавторстве с Д. Ю. Бовыкиным). ISBN 978-5-91671-975-8
- Французские гувернеры в России. История одной семьи. М.: Политическая энциклопедия, 2022. 206 с.

=== Manuals ===
- Утопии века Просвещения. М.: ИВИ, 2000. 90 с.; 2-е изд., испр. и доп. М.: ГАУГН-пресс, 2017. 96 с.
- История: учебник для 10 класса. Среднее (полное) общее образование (базовый уровень). / Под ред. А. В. Чудинова, А. В. Гладышева. М.: Издательский центр «Академия», 2006. 352 с. (в соавторстве).
- История Нового времени: 1600—1799 годы. Учебн. пособие для студ. высш. учебн. заведений / Под ред. А. В. Чудинова, П. Ю. Уварова, Д. Ю. Бовыкина. М.: Издательский центр «Академия», 2007; 2-е изд. испр. и доп. — 2009; 3-е изд. испр. и доп. — 2012. 384 с. (в соавторстве).
- История: учебник для 10 класса (базовый уровень) / Под ред. А. В. Чудинова, А. В. Гладышева. М.: Издательский центр «Академия», 2008; 2-е изд. — 2011; 3-е и 4-е изд. — 2012. 352 с. (в соавторстве).
- История: учебник для 11 класса (базовый уровень) / Под ред. А. В. Чудинова, А. В. Гладышева. М.: Издательский центр «Академия», 2009; 2-е доп. изд. — 2011; 3-е и 4-е изд. — 2012. 384 с. (в соавторстве).
- История для гуманитарных направлений: учебник для студ. учреждений высшего образования. М.: Издательский центр «Академия», 2015. 352 с. (в соавторстве).
- Сущность политики просвещенного абсолютизма. М.: ГАУГН-пресс, 2018. 56 c.; 2-е изд., доп. — 2021. 34 c.

=== Articles ===
- Прощание с эпохой (размышления над книгой В. Г. Ревуненкова «Очерки по истории Великой французской революции 1789—1814 гг.») // Вопросы истории. 1998. № 7.
- Масоны и Французская революция: дискуссия длиною в два столетия // Новая и новейшая история. 1999. No. 1.
- Будни Французской революции: истории заключённых Нижней Оверни, рассказанные ими самими // Казус: индивидуальное и уникальное в истории. 1999. Вып. 2.
- Суровое «счастье Спарты»: современники Французской революции о феномене Террора // Человек эпохи Просвещения. М.: Наука, 1999.
- Смена вех: 200-летие Революции и российская историография // Французский ежегодник 2000. М., 2000.
- Просвещённая элита (к истории понятия) // Французский ежегодник 2001. М., 2001.
- Депутаты-предприниматели в Учредительном собрании (1789—1791) // Французский ежегодник 2001. М., 2001. С. 171—182.
- «Русский якобинец» Павел Строганов. Легенда и действительность // Новая и новейшая история. 2001. № 4.
- «Слух, который нашептала история»: янсенизм и Французская революция (историографический аспект) Французский ежегодник. 2004. М., 2004.
- Размышления о скрытых смыслах дискуссии по проблеме якобинской диктатуры (60-е — 80-е годы XX в.) // Французский ежегодник 2007. М., 2007. С. 264—274.
- На руинах памяти: о новейших российских изданиях по истории Французской революции XVIII в. // Новое литературное обозрение. 2007. № 86. С. 395—409.
- Жирондисты / Чудинов А. В. // Железное дерево — Излучение (Электронный ресурс). — 2008. — С. 98. — (Большая российская энциклопедия : (в 35 т.) / гл. ред. Ю. С. Осипов; 2004—2017, т. 10). ISBN 978-5-85270-341-5
- Лотман, Карамзин, Ромм: реконструкция одной реконструкции // Неприкосновенный запас. 2008, № 3 (59).
- Хиджаб на родине Шовена (новейшие российские исследования по истории национального вопроса во Франции) // Неприкосновенный запас. 2008. № 5 (61). С. 239—255.
- Накануне «смены вех». Советская историография Французской революции в начале 1980–х гг. // Россия и мир: панорама исторического развития. Сб. науч. ст., посвящённый 70-летию исторического факультета Уральского государственного университета им. А. М. Горького. Екатеринбург, 2008. С. 112—127.
- И пятьдесят, и десять лет спустя. Двойной юбилей «Французского ежегодника» // Французский ежегодник 2009. Левые во Франции. М., 2009.
- Русские «участники» Французской революции // Французский ежегодник 2010: Источники по истории Французской революции XVIII в. и эпохи Наполеона. М., 2010. С. 6—236 (в соавторстве).
- С кем воевал русский мужик в 1812 году? Образ врага в массовом сознании // Французский ежегодник 2012: 200-летний юбилей Отечественной войны 1812 года. М., 2012. С. 336—365.
- Второе Каирское восстание: 20 марта — 21 апреля 1800 г. // Французский ежегодник 2015: К 225-летию Французской революции. М., 2015. C. 262—342.
- Падение французского Эль-Ариша. Декабрь 1799 г. // Французский ежегодник 2017: Франция и Средиземноморье в Новое и Новейшее время. М.: ИВИ РАН, 2017. С. 55—93.
- Чума в Восточной армии Бонапарта 1798–1801 гг. // Французский ежегодник 2021: Эпидемии в истории Франции. Т. 54. М.: ИВИ РАН, 2021. С. 63—90.
- Солдаты Бонапарта и женщины Востока // Французский ежегодник 2022: Французы за пределами Франции. Т. 55. М.: ИВИ РАН, 2022. С. 63—97.
