= Ker Baillie-Hamilton =

British colonial administrator (1804–1889)

Ker Ballie-Hamilton CB
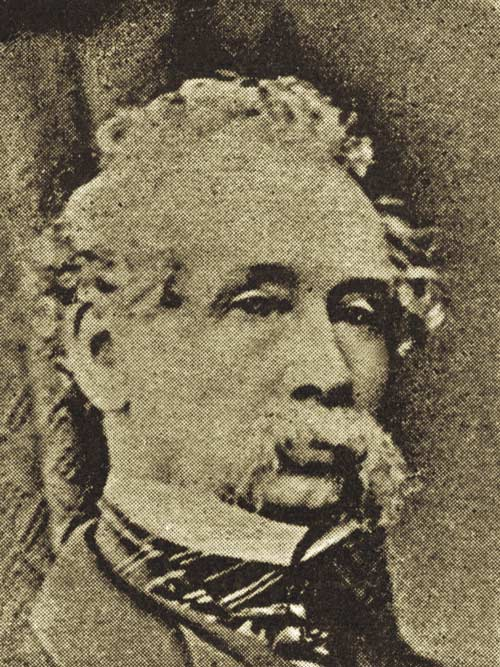

Lieutenant Governor of Grenada
- In office 1846–1851
- Preceded by: Carlo Joseph Doyle
- Succeeded by: Robert William Keate

Governor of Newfoundland
- In office 1852–1855
- Preceded by: Sir John Le Marchant
- Succeeded by: Sir Charles Henry Darling

Governor of Antigua
- In office 1855–1863
- Preceded by: Robert James Mackintosh
- Succeeded by: Sir Stephen John Hill

Personal details
- Born: 13 July 1804 Cleveland, Yorkshire, England
- Died: 6 February 1889 (aged 84) Tunbridge Wells, Kent, England

Viceregal styles of Ker Ballie-Hamilton
- Reference style: His Excellency
- Spoken style: Your Excellency

Ker Baillie-Hamilton CB (13 July 1804 – 6 February 1889) was a British colonial administrator. He was born in Cleveland, England, and died in Tunbridge Wells, England.

Hamilton was educated at the Royal Military College, Woolwich, where he went on to serve in India in 1822, Mauritius and the Cape of Good Hope. In 1836, he married Emma Blair. Baroness Lilford was one of his daughters.

In 1846 became Lieutenant Governor of Grenada. Beginning in 1851 he was the administrator of Barbados and the Windward Islands. In 1852, Hamilton was appointed governor of Newfoundland.

Hamilton antagonized the Newfoundland Liberal Party by impeding the decision of the British government in 1854 to grant responsible government. He was quickly transferred by the colonial office, and appointed governor of Antigua and the Leeward Islands in March 1855. He was appointed a Companion of the Order of the Bath (C.B.) in the 1862 Birthday Honours.

Baillie Hamilton died on 16 March 1889 in Tunbridge Wells.

== See also ==
- Governors of Newfoundland
- List of people from Newfoundland and Labrador

Government offices
Preceded by Carlo Joseph Doyle	Lieutenant Governor of Grenada; 1846–1851	Succeeded by Robert William Keate
Preceded by Sir John Le Marchant	Governor of Newfoundland; 1852–1855	Succeeded by Sir Charles Henry Darling
Preceded by Robert James Mackintosh	Governor of Antigua; 1855–1863	Succeeded by Sir Stephen John Hill
