= 1862 Birthday Honours =

Appointments by Queen Victoria

The 1862 Birthday Honours were appointments by Queen Victoria to various orders and honours to reward and highlight good works by citizens of the British Empire. The appointments were made to celebrate the official birthday of the Queen, and were published in The London Gazette on 23 May and 25 July 1862.

The recipients of honours are displayed here as they were styled before their new honour, and arranged by honour, with classes (Knight, Knight Grand Cross, etc.) and then divisions (Military, Civil, etc.) as appropriate.

== United Kingdom and British Empire ==
=== The Most Noble Order of the Garter ===
==== Knight of the Most Noble Order of the Garter (KG) ====
- The Right Honourable Charles John, Earl Canning
- The Right Honourable John, Earl Russell
- The Most Noble Edward Adolphus, Duke of Somerset
- The Right Honourable Anthony, Earl of Shaftesbury
- The Right Honourable William Thomas Spencer, Earl Fitzwilliam

=== The Most Honourable Order of the Bath ===
==== Knight Commander of the Order of the Bath (KCB) ====
===== Civil Division =====
Colonial Service

- William Stevenson CB Governor and Commander-in-Chief in and over the Island of Mauritius and its dependencies
- Philip Edmond Wodehouse CB Governor and Commander-in-Chief in and Over the Colony of the Cape of Good Hope and its Dependencies, and Her Majesty's High Commissioner for the settling and adjustment of the affairs of the territories adjacent or contiguous to the Eastern frontier of that colony
- Charles Henry Darling, Captain-General and Governor-in-Chief in and over the Island of Jamaica and its dependencies
- Major-General Edward Macarthur CB some time administering the Government of the Colony of Victoria

==== Companion of the Order of the Bath (CB) ====
===== Civil Division =====
Colonial Service

- Francis Hincks, Governor and Commander in-Chief in and over the Colony of British Guiana
- Charles John Bayley, Governor and Commander-in-Chief in and over the Bahama Islands and their dependencies
- Ker Baillie-Hamilton, Governor and Commander-in-Chief in and over the Islands of Antigua, Montserrat, Barbuda, St. Christopher Nevis, Anguilla, the Virgin Islands, and Dominica
- Arthur Edward Kennedy, some time Captain-General and Governor-in-Chief in and over the Colony of Sierra Leone and its dependencies, and subsequently Governor and Commander in Chief in and over the Colon of Western Australia
- Sir Alfred Stephen Kt Chief Justice of the Supreme Court of the Colony of New South Wales
- Henry Black, Judge of the Vice-Admiralty Court of the Province of Canada
