= Henry Turner Irving =

British politician (1833–1923)

Sir Henry Turner Irving GCMG

Acting Governor of British Ceylon
- In office 4 January 1872 – 4 March 1872
- Monarch: Queen Victoria
- Preceded by: Hercules Robinson
- Succeeded by: William Henry Gregory

Governor of Trinidad
- In office 1874–1880
- Preceded by: John Scott Bushe (acting)
- Succeeded by: John Scott Bushe (acting)

Personal details
- Born: 1833
- Died: 1923 (aged 89–90)
- Spouse: Emma Patty Barclay (m. 1884; died 1903)

Sir Henry Turner Irving, GCMG (1833–1923) was a British civil servant and colonial administrator. He first served as acting Governor of British Ceylon. In 1873–1874, he served as Governor of the Leeward Islands. In 1874–1880, he served as Governor of Trinidad. In 1882–1887, he served as Governor of British Guiana.

He was the first Governor of Trinidad to occupy the Government House, now known as the President's House.

He entered the Colonial Office as a clerk in 1854. In 1858, while at the Colonial Office, he served as a special messenger to William Ewart Gladstone who was then the Lord High Commissioner of the Ionian Islands. He then was appointed private secretary to the Permanent Under-Secretary, Sir Frederic Rogers in 1862. In 1865, he was selected to accompany the Governor of Jamaica, John Peter Grant, as Colonial Secretary of that colony.

He married on 24 June 1884 widow Emma Patty Johnson, née Barclay, daughter of Sir David Barclay, 10th Baronet. Lady Irving died in Folkestone on 5 February 1903. The couple had no children.

Government offices
| Preceded by Hercules Robinson | Acting; Governor of Ceylon; 1872 | Succeeded by William Henry Gregory |
| Preceded by Sir Benjamin Pine | Governor of the Leeward Islands; 1873–1874 | Succeeded by George Berkeley |
| Preceded by John Scott Bushe (acting) | Governor of Trinidad; 1874–1880 | Succeeded by John Scott Bushe (acting) |
| Preceded by Sir William Young | Governor of British Guiana; 1882–1887 | Succeeded by Charles Bruce |
