= Ian Turbott =

New Zealand-Australian diplomat (1922–2016)

Sir Ian Turbott AO CMG CVO

Administrator of Antigua
- In office 1958–1964
- Monarch: Queen Elizabeth II
- Prime Minister: Vere Bird (1960–1964)
- Preceded by: Alec Lovelace
- Succeeded by: David Rose

Administrator of Grenada
- In office 1964 – 3 March 1967
- Monarch: Queen Elizabeth II
- Prime Minister: Herbert Blaize
- Preceded by: Lionel Achille Pinard
- Succeeded by: Office changed to Governor

Governor of Grenada
- In office 1967–1968
- Monarch: Queen Elizabeth II
- Premier: Herbert Blaize (March–August 1967); Eric Gairy (August 1967–1968
- Preceded by: New creation
- Succeeded by: Hilda Bynoe

Personal details
- Born: Ian Graham Turbott; 9 March 1922 Whangārei, New Zealand
- Died: 11 August 2016 (aged 94)
- Relations: Graham Turbott (brother)
- Education: Auckland University College; Jesus College, Cambridge

Military service
- Allegiance: New Zealand
- Branch/service: New Zealand Army
- Years of service: 1940–46
- Rank: Captain
- Unit: New Zealand Expeditionary Force
- Battles/wars: World War II

Sir Ian Graham Turbott AO CMG CVO (9 March 1922 – 11 August 2016) was a New Zealand-Australian diplomat and university administrator.

== Early life and education ==
Turbott was born in Whangārei, New Zealand, and attended Takapuna Grammar School. He later studied at Auckland University College and Jesus College, Cambridge. He served six years in the New Zealand Army as part of the Second New Zealand Expeditionary Force during World War II, including service in Italy, the South Pacific and south-west Asia. He left the army with the rank of captain.

== Working life ==
After leaving uniformed service, Turbott joined the British Colonial Service with an appointment to the Gilbert and Ellice Islands Colony. After a secondment to the British Colonial Office, he served as Administrator of Antigua between 1958 and 1964. In 1964 he was appointed Administrator of Grenada, continuing in the role after it became a governorship in 1967. He left Grenada in 1968. After two years in Britain, he emigrated to Australia, where he entered business. Between 1989 and 2000 Turbott served as chancellor of the University of Western Sydney.

Turbott was the honorary consul-general for the Cook Islands in New South Wales from 1995 until his death.

== Community ==
Turbott was appointed (1982–1954) as both the NSW chair of the Duke of Edinburgh's International Award – Australia and a national board director.

== Honours ==
Turbott was made a knight bachelor in the 1968 British New Year's Honours List. In 1985 he was named Australian Father of the Year.

== Personal life ==
Turbott met his future wife, Nancy Lantz, on Christmas Eve 1951 when a Pan Am Boeing Stratocruiser on which she was a flight attendant landed on Canton Island, where he was stationed. They married soon after in the United States. Together they had three daughters. He died on 11 August 2016.

Academic offices
New title	Chancellor of the University of Western Sydney; 1989 – 2000	Succeeded by John Phillips
