= List of colonial governors and administrators of Antigua =

This is a list of viceroys of Antigua and Barbuda, from its initial colonisation in 1632 until its independence in 1981.

Between 1671 and 1816, Antigua was part of the British Leeward Islands and its viceroy was the Governor of the Leeward Islands. The colony of the Leeward Islands was split in two in 1816, and the Governor of Antigua became the viceroy in Antigua, Barbuda and Montserrat. In 1833 the British Leeward Islands were reformed, and the Governor of Antigua represented the monarch in all of the British Leeward Islands until 1872, when he became the Governor of the new federal colony of the Leeward Islands.

In 1956 the federal colony of the Leeward Islands was abolished, but the office of Governor of the Leeward Islands remained in existence until the end of 1959. Antigua's government continued under an Administrator, subordinated to the Governor of the Leeward Islands until 1960. The office of Administrator was retitled as Governor in 1967 when the colony attained the status of an associated state.

== Governors of Antigua (1632–1671) ==
- Sir Thomas Warner, 1632–1635
- Edward Warner, 1635–1639
- Rowland Thompson, 1639–1640
- Henry Ashton, 1640–1652
- Christopher Keynell, 1652–1660
- John Bunckley, 1661–1664
- Robert Carden, 1665–November 1666
- Robert le Fichot des Friches, sieur de Clodoré, November 1666, (French occupation)
- Quest, November 1666–9 November 1666, (French occupation)
- Daniel Fitche (or Fish), 1666–1667?
- Henry Willoughby, 1667–1670
- Samuel Winthrop, 1668–1671 eldest son of Governor John Winthrop of Massachusetts

== Lieutenant Governors of Antigua (1671–1747) ==
In 1671, Antigua became part of the newly formed colony of the Leeward Islands, whose governor remained on Antigua. Until 1747, a lieutenant governor was appointed on Antigua to oversee domestic affairs.

- Philip Warner, 1671–1675
- Rowland Williams, 1675–1678, first time
- James Vaughan, 1678–1680
- Valentine Russell, 1680–1682
- Paul Lee, 1682–1683
- Edward Powell, 1683–1688
- Rowland Williams, 1689–1692, second time
- John Parry, 1692
- Vacant, 1692–1698
- John Yeamans, 1698–1711
- John Hamilton, 1709 <Oliver, 3:320>
- Edward Byam, 1711 December 1741
- Nathaniel Crump, 1735 <Oliver, 3:320>
- George Lucas 1742–1743
- Josiah Martin, 1743-1748

== Vacancy(1747–1816) ==
From 1747 to 1816, there was no governor in Antigua, as they were administered as part of the British Leeward Islands.

== Governors of Antigua (1816–1872) ==
In 1816, the British Leeward Islands was dissolved, and a new governor was appointed in Antigua.

- George William Ramsay, 1816–1819
- Sir Benjamin d'Urban, 1819–1826
- Sir Patrick Ross, 1826–1832
- Evan John Murray MacGregor, 1832–1833, acting

From 1833, the Governor of Antigua was viceroy in the colony of the British Leeward Islands:

- Evan John Murray MacGregor, 1833–1836, continued, acting to 1834
- Sir William MacBean George Colebrooke, 1837–1842
- Sir Charles Augustus Fitzroy, 1842–1846
- James Macaulay Higginson, 1847–1850
- Robert James Mackintosh, 1850–1855
- Ker Baillie Hamilton, 1855–1863
- Sir Stephen John Hill, 1863–1868
- Sir Benjamin Chilley Campbell Pine, 1868–1872

In 1872, the Governor of Antigua became the Governor of the Leeward Islands.

== Presidents of Antigua (1872–1936) ==
- Edwin Donald Baynes, 1871–1883
- Henry Spencer Berkeley, 1883, acting
- Neale Porter, 1883–1888
- Frederick Evans, 1888–1895
- George Melville, 1895–1902
- Edward Alexander Foster, 16 Aug 1901 – 30 Oct 1901, acting for Melville
- St John Branch, Oct 1902 – 1909
- Henry Eugene Walter Grant, 1909–1912
- Thomas Alexander Vans Best, 1912–1919?
- Thomas Reginald St. Johnston, 13 Jun 1920 – 1924
- Edward William Baynes, 17 Oct 1925 – 1935
- Elwood D'Arcy Tibbits, 28 Apr 1930 – 12 Sep 1930, acting for Baynes
- Hubert Eugene Bader, Aug 1935 – 1936

== Administrators of Antigua (1936–1966) ==
Standard of the Administrator (1956–1967).

- Hubert Eugène Bader, 1936
- James Dundas Harford, 1936–1941
- Herbert Boon, 1941–1944
- F. S. Harcourt, 1944–1946
- Leslie Stuart Greening, 1946–1947
- Richard Wayne, 1947–1954
- Alec Lovelace, 1954–1958
- Ian Turbott, 1958–1964
- David James Gardiner Rose, 1964–1966

== Governors of Antigua (1967–1981) ==
Standard of the Governor (1967–1981).

- Sir Wilfred Jacobs, 1967–1981

According to the constitution of the Associated State of Antigua, the Governor of Antigua, who was Her Majesty's representative in Antigua, was to be chosen by Her Majesty, served during Her Majesty's pleasure, and appointed by Her Majesty. Before beginning to perform the duties of the office of governor, the person who has been appointed must take and sign the oaths of office and allegiance. The activities of the office of Governor shall be carried out by the person that Her Majesty may nominate during any time that the position is vacant, the holder of the office of Governor is not present in Antigua, or is otherwise unable to fulfill those functions. Any of the aforementioned individuals must take the oaths required by section 18 of this Constitution before taking on the responsibilities of the office of Governor. If the holder of the governorship has informed the person in question that he is about to assume or resume those duties, the person in question may not continue to carry out such duties. For the purposes of this section, the Governor shall not be deemed to be absent from Antigua or incapable of carrying out the duties of his office because he is (a) traveling from one area of Antigua to another; or (b) whenever a deputy has been appointed in accordance with Section 20 of this Constitution.

In 1981 the associated state of Antigua became independent as Antigua and Barbuda. For a list of viceroys after independence, see Governor-General of Antigua and Barbuda.

== See also ==
- History of Antigua and Barbuda
