= Hercules Robinson (Royal Navy officer) =

British Royal Navy admiral

Admiral Hercules Robinson
- Born: 16 March 1789
- Died: 15 May 1864 (aged 75)
- Occupation: Royal Navy admiral

Hercules Robinson (16 March 1789 – 15 May 1864) was a British Royal Navy admiral.

== Biography ==
Robinson born on 16 March 1789, was the eldest son of Christopher Robinson, rector of Granard, co. Longford, by Elizabeth, second daughter of Sir Hercules Langrishe, bart., of Knocktopher, co. Kilkenny. Sir Bryan Robinson was his brother. He entered the navy in June 1800, in the Penelope, with Captain Henry Blackwood, with whom he was also in the Euryalus at Trafalgar, and in the Ajax, till moved, in January 1807, to the Ocean flagship of Lord Collingwood in the Mediterranean. Two months later he was appointed to the Glory as acting-lieutenant, in which rank he was confirmed on 25 April 1807. In December he was moved to the Warspite, again with Blackwood, and in 1809 to the Téméraire in the Baltic, from which, on 30 August, he was promoted to the command of the Prometheus in the Baltic during 1810, and afterwards in the Atlantic, ranging as far as the Canary Islands, and even the West Indies. The Prometheus was an extremely dull sailer, incapable of improvement, so that any vessel she chased left her hopelessly astern; and it was owing only to the good fortune and judgment of her commander that she managed to pick up some prizes. On 7 June 1814 Robinson was advanced to post rank. From September 1817 to the end of 1820 he commanded the Favourite on the Cape of Good Hope and St. Helena station, and afterwards on the east coast of South America. In 1820 he was at Newfoundland and was appointed by the commander-in-chief to regulate the fishery of the coast of Labrador, which he did with tact, temper, and judgment. He had no further service afloat, and in 1846 accepted the retirement, becoming in due course rear-admiral on 9 October 1849, vice-admiral on 21 October 1856, and admiral on 15 January 1862. In 1842 he was sheriff of Westmeath. In 1856 he made a yachting voyage to the Salvages, a group of barren rocks midway between Madeira and the Canaries, on one of which a vast treasure, the spoil of a Spanish galleon, was said to be buried. When in the Prometheus Robinson had been sent to look for this treasure, but met with no success. A further search was rather the excuse than the reason for revisiting the islets in the yacht, but the voyage gave him an opportunity of writing 'Seadrift,' a small volume of reminiscences (8vo, 1858, with portrait). He died at Southsea on 15 May 1864. He married, in 1822, Frances Elizabeth, only child of Henry Widman Wood of Rosmead, Westmeath, and had issue six sons, of whom Sir Hercules George Robert Robinson, administrator in South Africa, was created Lord Rosmead in 1896.
