= James Mackintosh =

Scottish jurist, Whig politician and Whig historian

Sir James Mackintosh
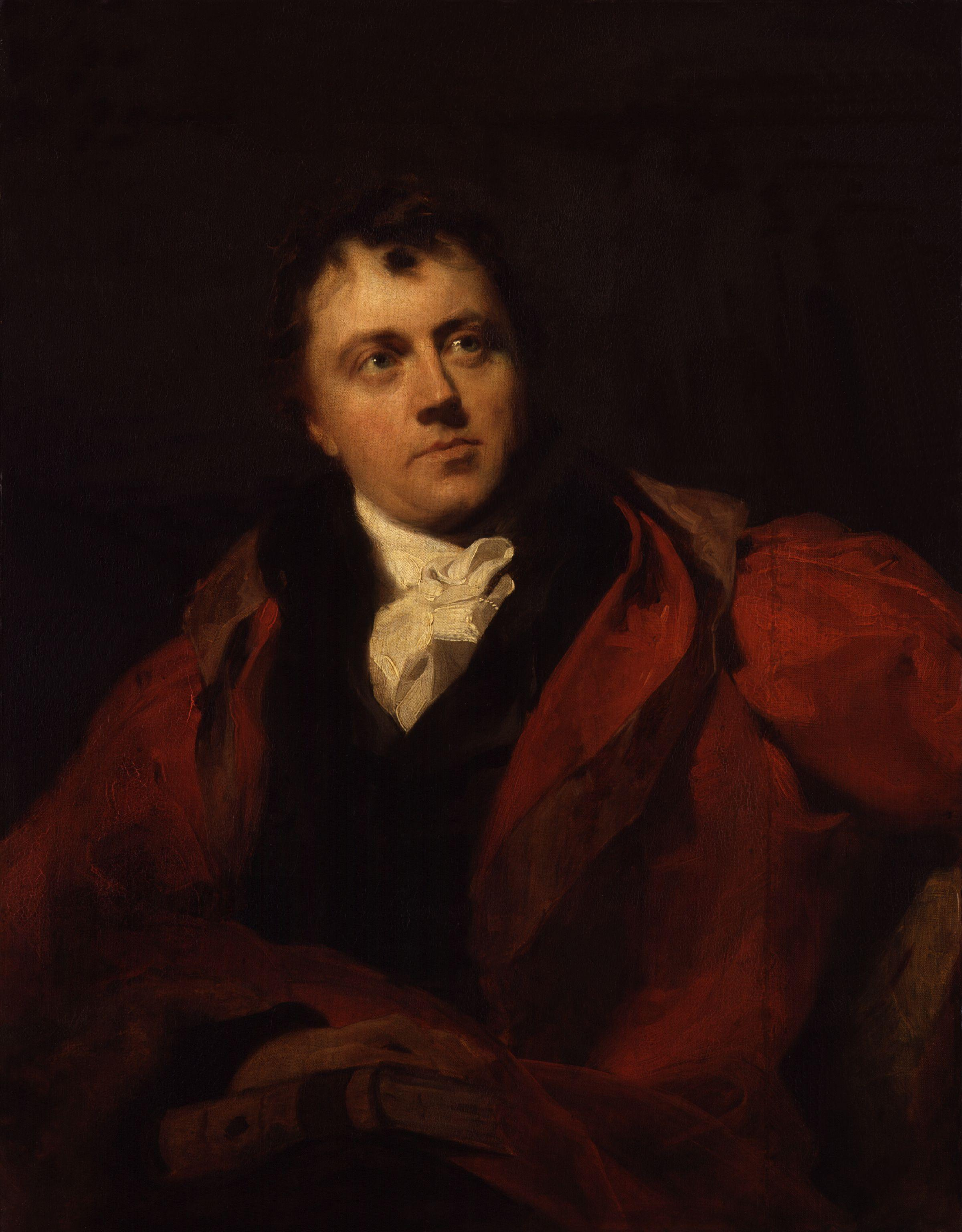
- Sir James Mackintosh —by Sir Thomas Lawrence.
- Born: 24 October 1765; Aldourie, Inverness-shire, Scotland
- Died: 30 May 1832 (aged 66)
- Citizenship: United Kingdom of Great Britain and Ireland
- Education: University of Aberdeen; University of Edinburgh
- Occupations: Political philosopher and politician
- Political party: Whig

Sir James Mackintosh FRS FRSE (24 October 1765 – 30 May 1832) was a Scottish jurist, Whig politician and Whig historian. His studies and sympathies embraced many interests. He was trained as a doctor and barrister, and worked also as a journalist, judge, administrator, professor, philosopher and politician.

== Early life ==
Mackintosh was born at Aldourie, 7 miles from Inverness, the son of Captain John Mackintosh of Kellachie (Kyllachy, near Tomatin, Inverness-shire). His mother was Marjory MacGillivray, a daughter of Alexander MacGillivray and his wife Anne Fraser, who was a sister to Brigadier-General Simon Fraser of Balnain. Both his parents were from old Highland families. His mother died while he was a child, and his father was frequently abroad, mainly due to the Seven Years War – being wounded in 1761 at the Battle of Villinghausen.

James was raised by his grandmother, and schooled at Fortrose Seminary academy. At age thirteen he proclaimed himself a Whig, and during playtime he persuaded his friends to join him in debates modelled on those of the House of Commons.

He went in 1780 to King's College, University of Aberdeen, where he made a lifelong friend of Robert Hall, later a famous preacher. In 1784, he began to study medicine at University of Edinburgh. He participated to the full in the intellectual ferment, became friendly with Benjamin Constant, but did not quite neglect his medical studies, and took his degree in 1787.

In 1788, Mackintosh moved to London, then agitated by the trial of Warren Hastings and the first lapse into insanity of George III. He was much more interested in these and other political events than in his professional prospects. He was also a founder member of the Society for the Prevention of Cruelty to Animals (later the RSPCA).

== French Revolution ==
Mackintosh was soon absorbed in the question of the time, the French Revolution. In April 1791, after long meditation, he published his Vindiciae Gallicae: A Defence of the French Revolution and its English Admirers, a reply to Edmund Burke's Reflections on the Revolution in France. It placed the author in the front rank of European publicists, and won him the friendship of some of the most distinguished men of the time. The success of the Vindiciae finally decided him to give up the medical for the legal profession. He was called to the bar in 1795 and gained a considerable reputation there as well as a tolerable practice.

Vindiciae Gallicae was the verdict of a philosophic liberal on the development of the French Revolution up to the spring of 1791. The excesses of the revolutionaries compelled him a few years later to oppose them and agree with Burke, but his earlier defence of the rights of man is a valuable statement of the cultured Whig's point of view at the time. Mackintosh was the first to see Burke's Reflections as "the manifesto of a counter revolution".

Charles James Fox singled out Mackintosh's book as that which did most justice to the French Revolution, and he preferred it over Burke and Thomas Paine. After Paine's Rights of Man, Mackintosh's book was the most successful reply to Burke and Burke's biographer F. P. Lock considers it "one of the best of the replies to Burke, in some respects superior to Rights of Man".

The poet Thomas Campbell claimed that had it not been for Mackintosh's book, Burke's anti-revolutionary opinions would have become universal amongst the educated classes and that he ensured that he became "the apostle of liberalism".

Mackintosh wrote to Burke on 22 December 1796, saying that "From the earliest moments of reflexion your writings were my chief study and delight...The enthusiasm with which I then embraced them is now ripened into solid Conviction by the experience and meditation of more mature age. For a time indeed seduced by the love of what I thought liberty I ventured to oppose your Opinions without ever ceasing to venerate your character...I cannot say...that I can even now assent to all your opinions on the present politics of Europe. But I can with truth affirm that I subscribe to your general Principles; that I consider them as the only solid foundation both of political Science and of political prudence". Burke replied that "As it is on all hands allowed that you were the most able advocate for the cause which you supported, your sacrifice to truth and mature reflexion, adds much to your glory". However, in private Burke was sceptical of what he considered Mackintosh's "supposed conversion". Burke invited Mackintosh to spend Christmas with him at his home in Beaconsfield, where he was struck by Burke's "astonishing effusions of his mind in conversation. Perfectly free from all taint of affectation...Minutely and accurately informed, to a wonderful exactness, with respect to every fact relative to the French Revolution".

When Mackintosh visited Paris in 1802 during the Peace of Amiens, he responded to compliments from French admirers of his defence of their revolution by saying: "Messieurs, vous m’avez si bien refuté".

== Lawyer ==
As a lawyer his greatest public efforts were his lectures (1799) at Lincoln's Inn on the law of nature and nations, of which the introductory discourse was published and ran to several editions; the resulting fame helped open doors for him later in life. Mackintosh was also famed for his speech in 1803 defending Jean Gabriel Peltier, a French refugee, against a libel suit instigated by Napoleon – then First Consul (military dictator) of France. Peltier had argued that Napoleon should be killed at a time when Britain and France were at peace. In front of an audience of ambassadors, it took only one minute for the jury to convict Jean-Gabriel, but the sentence was never applied as it was decidedly a political trial. J-G Peltier was no more satisfied with the judgment than Napoleon.

The speech was widely published in English and also across Europe in a French translation by Madame de Staël, who became a friend of Mackintosh. In 1803, he was knighted.

== Judge of Bombay ==
Upon being knighted, he was appointed Recorder of Bombay after Sir William Syer, taking up the post in 1804. Within a few months he had established the Bombay Literary Society at his home, where a circle of intellectuals and friends would meet to discuss the history, geography, zoology and botany of the sub-continent as well as its peoples and languages, customs and religions. The group would later evolve into the Asiatic Society of Mumbai.

He was however not at home in India, where he became ill, was disappointed by his literary progress with the mooted History of England, and was glad to leave for England in November 1811.

== Member of Parliament ==
Mackintosh declined the offer of Spencer Perceval to resume political life under the wing of the dominant Tory party, despite prospects of office. He entered Parliament in July 1813 as a Whig. He was the member for Nairn until 1818, and afterwards for Knaresborough, till his death.

In London society, and in Paris during his occasional visits, he was a recognized favourite. On Madame de Staël's visit to London he was able to keep up in talk with her. A close friend was Richard Sharp MP, known as "Conversation Sharp". and both men belonged to the Whig social group, the King of Clubs.

Mackintosh's parliamentary career was marked by his liberalism: he opposed reactionary measures of the Tory government; he supported and later succeeded Samuel Romilly in his efforts to reform the criminal code; and took a leading part both in Catholic emancipation and in the Reform Bill. His liberalism was, however, firmly Whiggish in orientation - alongside reformers like Thomas Babington Macaulay, Mackintosh was disdainful of the Utilitarian approach to reform, launching an attack on Jeremy Bentham's 'Plan of Parliamentary Reform' (1817) in the Edinburgh Review in 1818, and criticising the philosophy of human nature which underpinned the ideas of Bentham, James Mill, and other leading Utilitarians.

== Professor ==
From 1818-24, he was professor of law and general politics in the East India Company's College at Haileybury. While there, on 12 August 1823, Mackintosh wrote a two-sheet letter from Cadogan Place, London to James Savage asking for source material for Savage's edition of The History of Taunton by Joshua Toulmin.

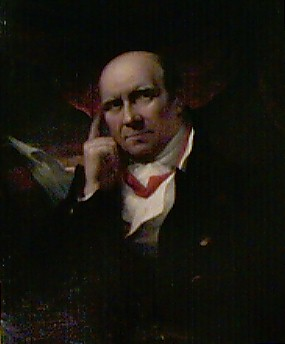
Sir James Mackintosh in later life.

In the midst of the attractions of London society and of his parliamentary avocations Mackintosh felt that the real work of his life was being neglected. His great ambition was to write a history of England; he also cherished the idea of making some worthy contribution to philosophy. It was not till 1828 that he set about the first task of his literary ambition.

This was his Dissertation on the Progress of Ethical Philosophy, prefixed to the seventh edition of the Encyclopædia Britannica. The dissertation, written mostly in ill-health and in snatches of time taken from his parliamentary engagements, was published in 1831. It was severely attacked in 1835 by James Mill in his Fragment on Mackintosh. About the same time he wrote for the Cabinet Cyclopaedia a History of England from the Earliest Times to the Final Establishment of the Reformation.

A privy councillor since 1828, Mackintosh was appointed a Commissioner for the affairs of India under the Whig administration of 1830.

== History of the Revolution in England in 1688 ==
His history of the Glorious Revolution, for which he had done considerable research and collected a large amount of material, was not published till after his death. Mackintosh only completed it to the time of James II's abdication. However his voluminous notes on the Glorious Revolution came into the possession of Thomas Babington Macaulay, who used them for his own History of the Revolution. Mackintosh's notes stopped in the year of 1701, where Macaulay's History also ends.

Mackintosh's work was published in 1834 and in his review of it, Macaulay said that he had "no hesitation" in proclaiming the book as "decidedly the best history now extant of the reign of James the Second" but lamented that "there is perhaps too much disquisition and too little narrative". He went on to praise Mackintosh: "We find in it the diligence, the accuracy, and the judgment of Hallam, united to the vivacity and the colouring of Southey. A history of England, written throughout in this manner, would be the most fascinating book in the language. It would be more in request at the circulating libraries than the last novel".

== Freemasonry ==
He was Initiated into Scottish Freemasonry in Lodge Holyrood House (St. Luke's), No.44, (Edinburgh) on 28 November 1785.

== Death ==
Sir James Mackintosh died at home, 15 Langham Place, London at the age of 66. A chicken bone became stuck in his throat, causing a traumatic choking episode. The bone was removed, but he died a month later on 30 May 1832. He was buried in Hampstead on 4 June.

== Legacy ==
A Life, by his son Robert James Mackintosh, was published in 1836. An edition of his works, in three volumes, (apart from the History of England) was published in 1846, containing his ethical and historical dissertations, a number of essays on political and literary topics, reviews, and other contributions to periodical publications, and speeches on a variety of subjects delivered at the bar and in parliament.

The Mackintosh River in Tasmania was named in his honour, by Henry Hellyer in November 1828.

== Works ==
- Arguments Concerning the Constitutional right of Parliament to Appoint a Regent (1788).
- Vindiciæ Gallicæ: A Defence of the French Revolution and its English admirers against the accusations of the Right Hon. Edmund Burke, including some strictures on the late production of Mons de Calonne (1791).
- A Letter to the Right Honourable William Pitt (1792).
- A Letter from Earl Moira to Colonel McMahon (1798).
- A Discourse on the Study of the Law of Nature and Nations; Introductory to a Course of Lectures on That Science Commenced in Lincoln's Inn Hall on Wednesday, February 13, 1799; In Pursuance to An Order of the Honourable Society of Lincoln's Inn (2nd ed.). London: T.Cadell, Jun. and W. Davies in the Strand... 1799. hdl:2027/osu.32435002314656.
- The Trial of Jean Peltier for Libel against Napoleon Buonaparte (1803).
- Proceedings at a General Meeting of the Loyal North Britons (1803).
- Plan of a Comparative Vocabulary of Indian Languages (1806).
- Dissertation on the Progress of Ethical Philosophy (1830, online (archive.org))
- The Life of Sir Thomas More (1830).
- The History of England (1830–1832, 3 vols.).
- History of the Revolution in England in 1688, prefaced by a notice of the Life, Writings and Speeches of Sir James Mackintosh (1834).
- Memoirs (edited by Robert James Mackintosh, 1835, 2 vols.: Vol. I, Vol. II)
- Inaugural Address (edited by J. B. Hay, 1839).
- Speeches, 1787–1831 (1840).

== Family ==
In 1789 Mackintosh married Catherine Stuart, whose brother Daniel later edited the Morning Post. His wife's prudence counteracted Mackintosh's own unpractical temperament, and his efforts in journalism became fairly profitable. They had a son, who died in infancy, and three daughters:

- Mary Mackintosh (1789–1876) married Claudius James Rich
- Maitland Mackintosh (1792–1861), married William Erskine
- Catherine Mackintosh (1795-18??) married Sir William Wiseman, 7th Baronet (1794–1845), and was the mother of Sir William Wiseman, 8th Baronet.

In 1797 Catherine died, and next year Mackintosh married Catherine Allen (died 6 May 1830), sister-in-law of Josiah II and John Wedgwood, through whom he introduced Samuel Taylor Coleridge to the Morning Post. They had two sons, one of whom died in infancy, and two daughters:

- Frances Emma Elizabeth Mackintosh (Fanny) (1800–1889), married Hensleigh Wedgwood.
- Robert Mackintosh (1803), died in infancy.
- Bessy Mackintosh (1804–1823)
- Robert James Mackintosh (1806–1864), colonial governor.

== Notes ==
Academic offices
Preceded by Lord Jeffrey	Rector of the University of Glasgow; 1822–1824	Succeeded by Baron Brougham and Vaux
