= Alec Lovelace =

Administrator of Antigua from 1954 to 1958 (1907–1981)

Administrator of Antigua
- In office August 1954 – 1958
- Preceded by: Richard Wayne
- Succeeded by: Ian Turbott

Lieutenant Colonel Alec Lovelace (1907 – 14 January 1981) was an official in colonial Antigua, who served as administrator of Antigua from 1954 to 1958 and as speaker of the Legislative Council in the late 1950s.

From 1946 to 1954, Lovelace was with the Colonial Office in Mauritius. From 1958 to 1960, he was Defence Officer with the Federal Government of the West Indies, and in 1960 he was made Administrator of Dominica. He retired in 1964.
