= F. P. Lock =

Frederick Peter Lock (born 1948) is Professor of English at Queen's University, Kingston, Ontario, Canada and a biographer of Edmund Burke.

== Works ==
- Susanna Centlivre (Twayne, 1979)
- The Politics of “Gulliver's Travels” (Oxford: Clarendon Press, 1980)
- Swift's Tory Politics (University of Delaware Press, 1983)
- Burke’s “Reflections on the Revolution in France” (Allen & Unwin, 1985)
- (co-editor with Claude Rawson), Collected Poems of Thomas Parnell (University of Delaware Press, 1989).
- Edmund Burke. Volume I: 1730–1784 (Oxford: Clarendon Press, 1999).
- Edmund Burke. Volume II: 1784–1797 (Oxford: Clarendon Press, 2006).
