= Bryan Robinson (judge) =

Irish-Newfoundlander politician

Sir Bryan Robinson (14 January 1808 – 6 December 1887) was an Irish-born lawyer, judge and politician in Newfoundland. He represented Fortune Bay in the Newfoundland and Labrador House of Assembly from 1842 to 1848.

He was born in Dublin, the son of Reverend Christopher Robinson, rector of Granard, and Elizabeth Langrishe, daughter of the politician Sir Hercules Langrishe and his wife Hannah Myhill, and was educated in Castleknock and at Trinity College Dublin. His paternal grandfather, Sir Christopher Robinson, had been a distinguished judge in Ireland, and this may have influenced his own choice of the law as a career. His brother was Hercules Robinson.

Robinson became part of the staff of Thomas John Cochrane, governor of Newfoundland, in 1828. He was subsequently named sheriff for the Labrador coast. Robinson was admitted to the Nova Scotia bar in 1831 and set up practice in Newfoundland. In 1834, he was named master in chancery for the Legislative Council of Newfoundland. In the same year, he married Selina Brooking. In 1844, Robinson was named Queen's Counsel. He served on the board of Commissioners of Roads for St. John's and the Board of Health for St. John's, and was also a justice of the peace. He also served as president of the St. John's agricultural society. Robinson was acting solicitor general in 1845, 1847 and 1849; he was acting attorney general in 1854. In 1858, he was named to the Supreme Court of Newfoundland. He retired to England in 1877 and was knighted in December of that year. Robinson died in Ealing at the age of 79.
