= Hercules Robinson, 1st Baron Rosmead =

5th Governor of Hong Kong (1824–1897)

The Right Honourable The Lord Rosmead GCMG PC
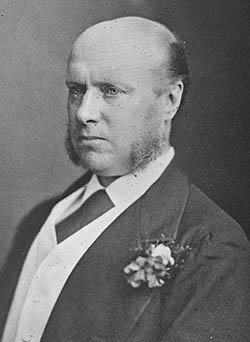

1st Administrator of Montserrat
- In office 14 February 1854 – 1855
- Monarch: Victoria
- Preceded by: Office established
- Succeeded by: Edward Rushworth

6th Lieutenant Governor of Saint Christopher
- In office 1855–1859
- Monarch: Victoria
- Preceded by: Sir Edward Hay
- Succeeded by: Sir Benjamin Pine

5th Governor of Hong Kong
- In office 9 September 1859 – 15 March 1865
- Monarch: Victoria
- Lieutenant: Charles van Straubenzee; Sir James Grant; Sir John Michel; Sir Charles Staveley; William Brown; Sir Philip Guy
- Preceded by: Sir John Bowring
- Succeeded by: Sir Richard Graves MacDonnell

Acting Governor of British Ceylon
- In office 21 March 1865 – 16 May 1865
- Monarch: Victoria
- Preceded by: Terence O'Brien (Acting governor)
- Succeeded by: Himself

13th Governor of British Ceylon
- In office 16 May 1865 – 4 January 1872
- Monarch: Victoria
- Preceded by: Himself (Acting governor)
- Succeeded by: Henry Turner Irving

14th Governor of New South Wales
- In office 4 March 1872 – 24 February 1879
- Monarch: Victoria
- Preceded by: The Earl Belmore
- Succeeded by: Lord Augustus Loftus

1st Governor of Fiji
- In office 10 October 1874 – June 1875
- Monarch: Victoria
- Preceded by: Office established
- Succeeded by: Sir Arthur Hamilton-Gordon

8th Governor of New Zealand
- In office 27 March 1879 – 9 September 1880
- Monarch: Victoria
- Premier: Sir George Grey; John Hall
- Preceded by: The Marquess of Normanby
- Succeeded by: Sir Arthur Hamilton-Gordon

8th High Commissioner for Southern Africa
- In office 22 January 1881 – 1 May 1889
- Monarch: Victoria
- Prime Minister: Thomas Charles Scanlen; Thomas Upington; Sir Gordon Sprigg
- Preceded by: Sir George Strahan (acting)
- Succeeded by: Sir Henry Smyth (acting)

8th Governor of Cape Colony
- In office 22 January 1881 – 1 May 1889
- Monarch: Victoria
- Prime Minister: Thomas Charles Scanlen; Thomas Upington; Sir Gordon Sprigg
- Preceded by: Sir George Strahan (acting)
- Succeeded by: Sir Henry Smyth (acting)

Acting Governor of British Mauritius
- In office 15 December 1886 – 18 December 1886
- Monarch: Victoria
- Preceded by: Henry Nicholas Duverger-Beyts (acting)
- Succeeded by: William Hanbury Hawley (acting)

10th High Commissioner for Southern Africa
- In office 30 May 1895 – 21 April 1897
- Monarch: Victoria
- Prime Minister: Cecil Rhodes; Sir Gordon Sprigg
- Preceded by: Sir Henry Brougham Loch
- Succeeded by: Sir William Goodenough (acting)

10th Governor of Cape Colony
- In office 30 May 1895 – 21 April 1897
- Monarch: Victoria
- Prime Minister: Cecil Rhodes; Sir Gordon Sprigg
- Preceded by: Sir Henry Brougham Loch
- Succeeded by: Sir William Goodenough (acting)

Baron Rosmead
- Baron Rosmead, of Rosmead in the County of Westmeath and of Tafelberg in South Africa
- Tenure: 10 August 1896 – 28 October 1897
- Predecessor: none (new creation)
- Successor: Hercules Arthur Temple Robinson, 2nd Baron Rosmead
- Other titles: Baronet of Ennismore Gardens
- Born: Hercules George Robert Robinson; 19 December 1824; Rosmead, County Westmeath, Ireland
- Died: 28 October 1897 (aged 72); London, England
- Buried: Brompton Cemetery, London, England
- Spouse: Lady Nea Arthur Ada Rose D'Amour Annesley
- Issue: Hercules Arthur Temple Robinson (b. 10 October 1891) Hon. Eleanor Frances Alti Maria Robinson (d. 24 Nov 1893); Hon. Nora Augusta Maud Robinson Hon. Nerida Leeta Robinson
- Heir: Hercules Arthur Temple Robinson
- Parents: Admiral Hercules Robinson; Frances Elizabeth Wood
- Occupation: Army officer, colonial administrator

Hercules George Robert Robinson, 1st Baron Rosmead, GCMG, PC (19 December 1824 – 28 October 1897), was a British colonial administrator who became the 5th Governor of Hong Kong, then 13th Governor of Ceylon, and subsequently, the 14th Governor of New South Wales, the first Governor of Fiji, and the 8th Governor of New Zealand. Later in his career he held various positions in Southern Africa, including two terms as Governor of the Cape Colony. From June 1859 until August 1896, he was known as Sir Hercules Robinson.

== Early life and Government career ==
He was of Irish descent on both sides; his father was Admiral Hercules Robinson, his mother was Frances Elizabeth Wood, from Rosmead, County Westmeath, from which he afterwards took his title. From the Royal Military College, Sandhurst, he was commissioned into the 87th Foot as a second lieutenant on 27 January 1843, he was promoted lieutenant by purchase on 6 September 1844, and reached the rank of captain. However, in 1846, through the influence of Lord Naas, Robinson obtained a post in the Board of Public Works in Ireland and subsequently became chief commissioner of fairs and markets.

His energy in these positions, notably during the famine of 1848, and the clearness and vigour of his reports, secured for him at the age of 29 the office of president of the council of the island of Montserrat on 14 February 1854.

Robinson also pushed for the introduction of a cadet scheme in the colonial administration during the similar serendipitous civil service reforms advocated by William Gladstone, the then chancellor of the exchequer. He proposed a civil service examination held in the UK that selected the successful candidates (the cadet) to learn Chinese and subsequently work in Hong Kong. The approval of the Colonial Office to this proposal resulted in the gradual expansion of the cadet and although the cadet did not fulfil the initial expectation of working as an interpreter, they provided excellent civil service in the administration and established rules in the process, emancipating the administration from ad hoc and disorganised practices.

== Service in St Kitts and Hong Kong ==
Subsequently, Robinson was appointed lieutenant-governor of Saint Kitts on 6 November 1855, serving until 1859. On 17 June 1859, aged 35 Robinson was appointed as Governor of Hong Kong, the youngest in Hong Kong colonial history, as which he served until March 1865. On 28 June 1859, he was knighted in recognition of his services for introducing coolie labour into the territory.

During his tenure, Robinson secured the control of the Kowloon Peninsula from the Imperial Chinese Government, thus expanding the size of the territory. Up to this point, the Colony of Hong Kong only consisted of Hong Kong Island. Also, Robinson ordered the construction of the Pokfulam Reservoir, which would provide a steady supply of water for Hong Kong people for years to come. Robinson was also credited with establishing Towngas, the territory's premier gas provider (a position it still holds today), for lighting the streets.

During Robertson's administration, HSBC, along with Standard Chartered, were established in Hong Kong. Both were given the responsibility to print banknotes on the behalf of the Government, a responsibility both banks still hold today.

== Service in Ceylon, New South Wales and New Zealand ==
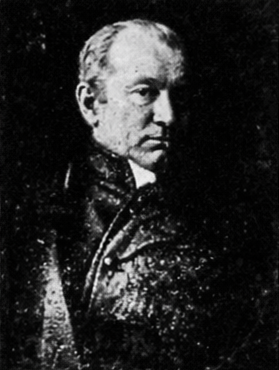
Hercules Robinson portrait

On 6 March 1865, Robinson was appointed Governor of Ceylon. On 30 June 1869, he was appointed Knight Commander of the Order of St Michael and St George (KCMG). From 4 March 1872 to 24 February 1879, he served as the Governor of New South Wales. Before his arrival in the colony, the Australian Town and Country Journal apprised its readers of Robinson's "high reputation for administrative ability" and provided biographical details. He attended the official opening of Sydney's grand new General Post Office on 1 September 1874.

During this governorship, Robinson was involved in the successful efforts to annexe the Fiji Islands to the British Empire, and his services were rewarded on 28 January 1875 by promotion to Knight Grand Cross of the Order of St Michael and St George (GCMG). He temporarily served as Governor of Fiji from 10 October 1874 to June 1875, while concurrently Governor of New South Wales. On 24 February 1879, Robinson was transferred to New Zealand, and on 21 August 1880, in the wake of the Anglo-Zulu War, he succeeded Sir Henry Bartle Frere as High Commissioner for Southern Africa (George Cumine Strahan was also appointed as interim administrator to act until Robinson could arrive from New Zealand).

== Service in South Africa ==
Robinson arrived in South Africa shortly before the disaster of Majuba, and was one of the commissioners for negotiating a peace and determining the future status of Transvaal. The job was known to be personally distasteful to him, for it left him with the task of conciliating, on the one hand, a Dutch party elated with victory, and on the other hand a British party almost ready to despair of the British connection.

In 1883, Robinson was called home to advise the government on the terms of the new convention concluded with the Transvaal Boers, and was appointed a member of the Privy Council. On 27 February 1884 Robinson signed the London Convention for the British government, with Paul Kruger, the new state president of the South African Republic, S.J. du Toit and N.J. Smit signing for the South African Republic.

On his return to South Africa, Robinson he found that a critical situation had arisen in Bechuanaland (today's Botswana), where Boer commandos had seized large tracts of territory and proclaimed the republics of Stellaland and Goshen. The commandos refused to retire within the limits of the Transvaal as defined by the new convention, and Robinson, aware of the necessity of preserving this country – the main road to the north – for the British Empire, determined on vigorous action.

John Mackenzie and later Cecil Rhodes were sent to secure the peaceful submission of the Boers, but without immediate result, partly owing to the attitude of the Cape ministry. Robinson's declaration that the advice of his ministers to patch up a settlement with the filibustering Boers was equivalent to a condonation of crime, led to the expedition of Major General Sir Charles Warren and the annexation of Bechuanaland early in 1885. He repeatedly argued for the Bechuanaland Protectorate to be extended north, beyond 22°. The British government resisted the idea until 1890, when land north of 22° was incorporated.

The difficulties of Robinson's position were illustrated by the dispute which arose between him and Warren, who declared that the high commissioner's duties to the home government were at times in conflict with the action which, as governor of Cape Colony, he was bound to take on the advice of his ministers in the interests of the colony. Sir Hercules Robinson succeeded in winning the confidence of President Kruger by his fair-mindedness, while he seconded Rhodes' efforts to unite the British and Dutch parties in Cape Colony. His mind, however, was that of the administrator as distinguished from the statesman, and he was content to settle difficulties as they arose.

In 1886, Robinson investigated the charges brought against Sir John Pope Hennessy, Governor of Mauritius, and decreed his suspension pending the decision of the home authorities, who eventually reinstated Hennessy. In 1887 Robinson was induced by Rhodes to give his consent to the conclusion of a treaty with Lobengula which secured British rights in Matabele and Mashona lands.

In May 1889, Robinson retired. In his farewell speech, he declared that there was no permanent place in South Africa for direct Imperial rule. This was interpreted to mean that South Africa must ultimately become independent – an idea repugnant to him. He explained in a letter to The Times in 1895 that he had referred to the "direct rule of Downing Street over the crown colonies, as contrasted with responsible colonial government."

Robinson was created a baronet on 6 February 1891. Early in 1895, when he had entered his 71st year in below average health, he yielded to the entreaties of Lord Rosebery's cabinet, and went out again to South Africa, in succession to Sir Henry Loch.

== Second term as Governor of Cape Colony ==
His second term of office was not fortunate. The Jameson Raid produced a permanent estrangement between him and Cecil Rhodes, and he was out of sympathy with the new colonial secretary, Joseph Chamberlain, who had criticised his appointment, and now desired Robinson to take this opportunity of settling the whole question of the position of the Uitlanders in the Transvaal.

Robinson answered that the moment was inopportune and that he must be left to choose his own time. Alarmed at the imminent danger of war, he confined his efforts to inducing the Johannesburgers to lay down their arms on condition that the raiders' lives were spared, not knowing that these terms had already been granted to Jameson. He came home to confer with the government, and on 10 August 1896 was raised to the peerage as Baron Rosmead, of Rosmead in the County of Westmeath and of Tafelberg in South Africa. The new Lord Rosmead returned to South Africa later in the year, but was compelled by ill-health, in April 1897, to quit his post.

== Personal life ==
Robinson married The Honourable Nea Arthur Ada Rose D'Amour Annesley, fifth daughter of The 10th Viscount Valentia, in 1846. Lady Robinson was described as "a majestic-looking woman", "fond of gaiety and society".

Their daughter, Nora, (born in St Kitts in 1858) married Alexander Finlay in St James' Church, Sydney on 7 August 1878. This vice-regal wedding attracted great interest from the populace and press. A crowd of up to 10,000 onlookers was reported and the guest list included many of the most important people in the colony.

Robinson died in London on 28 October 1897, and is buried in Brompton Cemetery, London. His son, Hercules Arthur Temple Robinson, succeeded to the title of Baron Rosmead.

== Legacy ==
In Hong Kong, Robinson Road, Rosmead Road (樂善美道), and Robinson Island (鴨洲) were all named after him. There was a Robinson Road in the Kowloon Peninsula that was named after him. However, the name was changed to Nathan Road on 19 March 1909. In Sri Lanka, Rosmead Place in Colombo 7 was named after him.

In South Africa, there are two Rosmead Avenues in Cape Town, one in Claremont–Kenilworth and the other in Oranjezicht, a suburb of Cape Town proper. South Africa also includes two small towns named Rosmead, one near Kimberley in the Northern Cape and one near Middelburg in the Eastern Cape.

In Australia, a building in Crown Street, Sydney, includes a couple of terraced houses named for Hercules Robinson. A monumental bust of Sir Hercules sits atop the facade. On Sydney's General Post Office at 1 Martin Place, on the Pitt Street side arches of the building, there are carvings of four of New South Wales governors including Sir Hercules.

== Honours and arms ==
- Knight Bachelor, 1859
- Knight Commander of the Order of St Michael and St George (KCMG), 1869
- Knight Grand Cross of the Order of St Michael and St George (GCMG), 1875
- Baronet of Ennismore Gardens in the Parish of St Margaret, Westminster, in the County of London, 1891
- Baron Rosmead, of Rosmead in the County of Westmeath and of Tafelberg in South Africa, 1896

Coat of arms of Hercules George Robert Robinson, 1st Baron Rosmead
Notes Granted on 2 February 1891 by Sir John Bernard Burke, Ulster King of Arms. Crest Out of a crown vallory Or a mount Vert thereon a buck as in the arms. Escutcheon Vert a chevron engrailed between three bucks at gaze Or each charged on the shoulder with a fleur-de-lis Azure. Motto Legi, regi, fidus (Faithful to the Law and the King) Other versions Full achievements:

== Sources ==
Government offices
Preceded by (none)	Administrator of Montserrat; 1854–1855	Succeeded by Edward Everard Rushworth
Preceded by Edward Hay Drummond Hay	Lieutenant Governor of Saint Christopher; 1855–1859	Succeeded by Benjamin Pine
Preceded by Acting William Caine	5th Governor of Hong Kong; 1859–1865	Succeeded by Acting Administrator William Mercer
Preceded by Terence O'Brien acting governor	Acting; Governor of Ceylon; 1865	Succeeded by Himself
Preceded by Himself	Governor of Ceylon; 1865–1872	Succeeded by Henry Turner Irving acting governor
Preceded by The Earl Belmore	Governor of New South Wales; 1872–1879	Succeeded by Lord Augustus Loftus
Preceded by (none)	Governor of Fiji; 1874–1875	Succeeded by Sir Arthur Hamilton-Gordon
Preceded by The Marquess of Normanby	Governor of New Zealand; 1879–1880	Succeeded by Sir Arthur Hamilton-Gordon
Preceded by Sir Henry Bartle Frere	High Commissioner for Southern Africa and Governor of Cape Colony; 1881–1889	Succeeded by Sir Henry Brougham Loch
Preceded by Sir Henry Brougham Loch	High Commissioner for Southern Africa and Governor of Cape Colony; 1895–1897	Succeeded by Sir Alfred Milner
Peerage of the United Kingdom
New creation	Baron Rosmead; 1896–1897	Succeeded by Hercules Arthur Temple Robinson
Baronetage of the United Kingdom
New creation	Baronet (of Rosmead); 1891–1897	Succeeded by Hercules Arthur Temple Robinson
