= Robert James Mackintosh =

British colonial governor

- Born: 1806
- Died: 1864 (aged 57–58)
- Occupation: Colonial governor
- Spouse: Mary "Molly" Appleton
- Parent: James Mackintosh

Robert James Mackintosh (1806–1864) was a British colonial governor. He was the son of Sir James Mackintosh and his second wife. As Governor of Antigua, he was the viceroy in the Leeward Islands colony between 1850 and 1855.

He married Mary "Molly" Appleton, daughter of the American merchant Nathan Appleton, in Boston, Massachusetts, in 1839, and had a son Ronald.

== Notes ==
Government offices
Preceded by Charles Cunningham	Lieutenant Governor of Saint Christopher; 1847–1850	Succeeded by Edward Hay Drummond Hay
Preceded by James Macaulay Higginson	Governor of Antigua; 1850–1855	Succeeded by Ker Baillie Hamilton
