= Benjamin Pine =

British colonial administrator

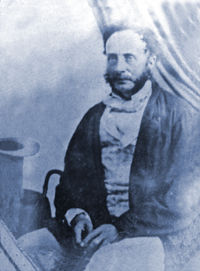
Sir Benjamin Chilley Campbell Pine

Sir Benjamin Chilley Campbell Pine (1809 – 25 February 1891) was at various times administrator of Natal, the Gold Coast, Antigua, the Leeward Islands and Western Australia.

== Life ==
Born in 1809 in Maidstone Kent, Benjamin Pine was educated in Brighton and at Trinity College, Cambridge. He became a career officer in the British Colonial Service. From 1850 to 1855, he was Lieutenant-Governor of Natal Colony, and from March 1857 until 17 April 1858 was Governor of the Gold Coast.

On 30 July 1868, Pine was appointed by letters patent to the position of Governor of Western Australia. Shortly afterwards, however, a vacancy occurred for the position of Governor of the Leeward Islands, and it was decided that he should fill that position instead. He never arrived in Western Australia, and six months passed before the colony received news that he would not be coming.

Pine served as Governor of the Leeward Islands from 1869 until 1871. His title then became Governor of Antigua until 1873, but the Leeward Islands continued under his governorship. He died in 1891.

The city of Pinetown, in modern-day KwaZulu-Natal, South Africa, is named after him.

There is also a Primary school called Benjamin Pine Primary School named after him in Pinetown as well as the Pinetown High Schools (Boys and Girls) Honouring his name by the Pine Cones on the Badges.

He is buried on the eastern side of Highgate Cemetery. His grave (no.29309) has no headstone or marker.

== Status as Governor of Western Australia ==
In Burt (1996), Sir Francis Burt, who was a lawyer, a judge and himself a former Governor of Western Australia, analysed the question whether Pine should be considered to have served as Governor of Western Australia. He concluded that the appointment by letters patent, together with the publication of that appointment in the newspapers of the colony, legally implied that Pine was Governor of Western Australia, even though he never arrived at the colony and was never sworn in.

The person who actually administered the colony during the period of Pine's formal tenure (2 November 1868–29 September 1869) was Lieut Col John Bruce.

Government offices
Preceded by Martin Thomas West	Lieutenant Governor of Natal; 1850–1855	Succeeded by John Scott
Preceded by Henry Connor	Governor of the Gold Coast; 1857–1858	Succeeded by Henry Bird
Preceded by Sir Hercules Robinson	Lieutenant Governor of Saint Christopher; 1860–1866	Succeeded by James George Mackenzie
Preceded by John Hampton	Governor of Western Australia; 1868–1869	Succeeded by Frederick Weld
Preceded by Sir Steven John Hill	Governor of Antigua; 1869–1871	Post abolished
Vacant Dissolution of the Leeward Islands Title last held by Sir James Leith	Governor of the Leeward Islands; 1871–1873	Succeeded by Sir Henry Turner Irving
Preceded by Thomas Miles	Lieutenant Governor of Natal; 1873–1875	Succeeded by Sir Garnet Joseph Wolseley
