= Edward Rushworth (colonial administrator) =

British colonial administrator

Sir Edward Everard Rushworth GCB (23 August 1818 – 10 August 1877) was a British colonial administrator in the 19th century.

He was born in Freshwater, Isle of Wight in 1818 and educated at St John's College, Oxford, graduating BCL in 1840 and DCL in 1844.

He married Amelia Adelaide de les Derniers at St Paul's Cathedral in Halifax, Nova Scotia, on 13 January 1855. Later that Year he replaced Hercules Robinson as the Administrator of Montserrat. From 1860 until 1869 he was Government Secretary to the Court of Polity in British Guiana when he became Colonial Secretary of Jamaica. For a few days in January 1877 he was its acting Governor and died there on 10 August that year from Yellow Fever.

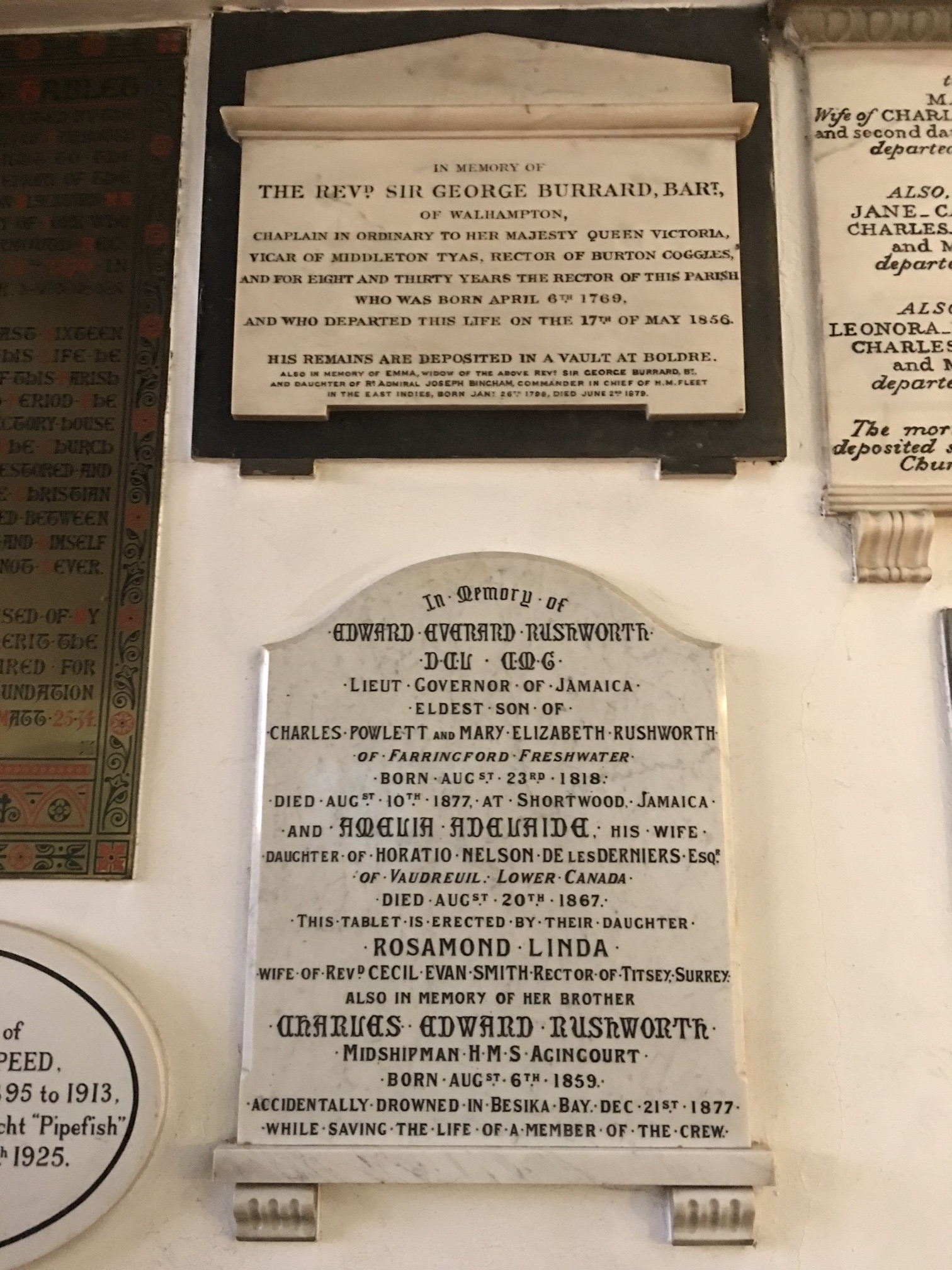
Memorial to Edward Rushworth in St James' Church, Yarmouth, Isle of Wight
