= Kernel patch =

Kernel patch may refer to:

- Kernel Patch Protection (KPP), a feature of 64-bit (x64) editions of Microsoft Windows that prevents patching the kernel, informally known as PatchGuard
- kpatch, a feature of the Linux kernel that implements live patching of a running kernel
- Ksplice, an extension of the Linux kernel that allows security patches to be applied to a running kernel
- XNU kernel patch, a series of initial patches necessary to run the OSx86 kernel on non-Apple hardware
- TRESOR, a Linux kernel patch which provides CPU-only based encryption to defend against cold boot attacks
