= Kdump =

kdump may refer to:

- kdump (BSD), a BSD utility for viewing trace files generated by the ktrace utility
- kdump (Linux), Linux kernel's crash dump mechanism, which internally uses kexec
