= Superblock =

Superblock may refer to:

== Urban planning ==
- Superblock (urban planning), a type of city block that is much larger than a traditional city block
  - Superblock (University of Minnesota), a section of the Health area in the East Bank of the Minneapolis campus, US
  - Superblock, a former large area formed after urban renewal in the cityscape of Huntington, West Virginia, US
- The Barcelona superblocks, a way to encourage walking, wheeling and bus use over private cars for short journeys. See Barcelona's superilles in City block.

== Computing ==
- Superblock (file system), a segment of metadata describing the file system on a block device, as in the Unix File System
- Superblock, in the density matrix renormalization group numerical technique
- Superblock algorithm, in the pairwise summation numerical analysis
- Superblock, of pixels, for example in the AV1 video coding format, or VP9
- Superblocks, of memory in the Hoard C dynamic memory allocation

== See also ==
- Superblock scheduling, a type of instruction scheduling
