= Shuah Khan =

American software engineer

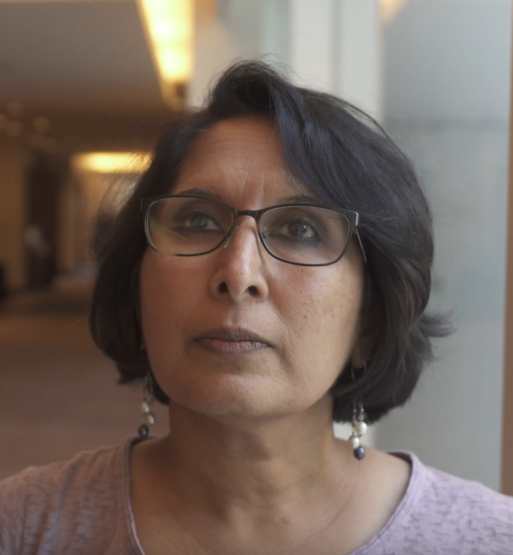
- Khan in 2018
- Born: 1964 (age 61–62); Andhra Pradesh, India
- Occupation: Software engineer
- Employer: Linux Foundation
- Website: www.gonehiking.org/ShuahLinuxBlogs/

Shuah Khan is an American software engineer recognized for her contributions to the Linux kernel. In 2019, she became the first female Linux Foundation Fellow, joining notable figures such as Linus Torvalds and Greg Kroah-Hartman as the third fellow at the time.

== Early life and education ==
She was born in 1964 at Ongole, a town in Andhra Pradesh, India. Her father Dr Nayani Ranganayakulu was a veterinary Doctor in AP Government Services. She had her Primary and Secondary Education in remote villages in Government Schools because of her father's frequent transfers. From childhood she was a bright, intelligent and hard working student. After Plus 2, she attended Andhra University Engineering College at Visakhapatnam, Andhra Pradesh. She received her B Tech Degree with high marks before moving to the United States to pursue her masters' degree. Khan then obtained a bachelor's degree in electronic engineering and a master's degree in computer science from Colorado State University. After completing her education, she worked at Bell Labs, followed by 13 years at Hewlett Packard Enterprise and 5 years at Samsung.

== Linux kernel contributions ==
Khan made her first contribution to the Linux kernel in 2011, by adding a new device driver for the LED sub-system as part of the Android Driver Mainlining effort. Khan has served on the Linux Technical Advisory Board (TAB) and as chair of the ELISA Project Technical Steering Committee. As of October 2024, she maintains the Kernel Selftest (kselftest) framework, the USB over IP driver, the CPU power monitoring subsystem, and the Virtual Media Controller driver. She has significantly contributed to kselftest, a regression testing suite for the Linux kernel.

In the early stages, testing in the kernel was mostly limited to build and boot tests. Khan introduced a more comprehensive testing framework to detect regressions earlier, before they could impact users. Her efforts resulted in "kselftest", which enables developers to run sanity tests and ensure the stability of their changes. This framework is now integrated into KernelCI and the 0-day test service. Describing herself as a generalist, she has also worked on the media subsystem by solving shared device resource management problems impacting components of the Media Controller Device Allocator API.

In 2020, Khan provided a "Signed-off-by" tag for a patch recommending inclusive terminology in the Linux kernel. This change was approved and merged by Linus Torvalds. The patch advised developers to avoid terms such as "master", "slave", "blacklist", and "whitelist". Alternatives such as primary/secondary, denylist/allowlist, and blocklist/passlist are suggested.

Khan has presented several times at the annual Linux Kernel Developers Summit. As of August 2025, she serves on the Linux kernel Code of Conduct committee. She has been elected by the Linux kernel community to serve the Linux Foundation Technical Advisory Board alongside her fellow kernel fellow. She had served on the Linux Foundation Technical Advisory Board from 2015-2017.

== Writing ==
In September 2026, Khan released a memoir, Finding an Ocean. The book begins with her great-grandparents and their lives in southeast India, moving to her grandparents and then her parents' arranged marriage by Chapter 4. Khan's father was a veterinarian for the State of Andhra Pradesh, and her memoir chronicles her family's many moves from village to village. The book ends with Khan taking a plane for the very first time to travel to Fort Collins, Colorado, for graduate school. Each chapter in the book revolves around a sameta, or proverb, that is translated from her native language of Telugu; the book's title comes from a sameta about a frog leaving its well (a metaphor for her small villages) and discovering an ocean (the world). Khan's follow-up memoir, detailing her life in the United States and her career into Linux kernel work, is expected to be released in the summer of 2027.

== Community involvement ==
Khan also leads the Linux Foundation Mentorship program and advocates for increasing the participation of women in the kernel community. Khan has presented several times at the annual Linux Kernel Developers Summit and is a frequent speaker at Open Source and Linux Kernel conferences.

== Publications ==
- Khan S. "White Paper: Advancing Open Source Safety-Critical Systems" (PDF). The Enabling Linux In Safety Applications (ELISA) project. Archived from the original (PDF) on October 7, 2024.
- Khan S. "A Beginner's Guide to Linux Kernel Development".
- Finding an Ocean (2026, NoCo Press; ISBN 978-1-969335-30-3)
