= SILO (bootloader) =

- Stable release: 1.4.14
- Type: Bootloader
- License: GPLv2+
- Website: SILO web
- Repository: git.kernel.org/cgit/linux/kernel/git/davem/silo.git

The SPARC Improved bootLOader (SILO) is the bootloader used by the SPARC port of the Linux operating system; it can also be used for Solaris as a replacement for the standard Solaris boot loader.

SILO generally looks similar to the basic version of LILO, giving a "boot:" prompt, at which the user can press the Tab key to see the available images to boot. The configuration file format is reasonably similar to LILO's, as well as some of the command-line options. However, SILO differs significantly from LILO because it reads and parses the configuration file at boot time, so it is not necessary to re-run it after every change to the file or to the installed kernel images. SILO is able to access ext2, ext3, ext4, UFS, romfs and ISO 9660 file systems, enabling it to boot arbitrary kernels from them (more similar to GRUB).

SILO also has support for transparent decompression of gzipped vmlinux images, making the bzImage format unnecessary on SPARC Linux.

SILO is loaded from the SPARC PROM.

Licensed under the terms of the GNU General Public License (GPL).

== See also ==
- bootman
- LILO
- elilo
- Yaboot
- NTLDR
- BCD
