= Linux kernel oops =

Serious non-fatal error in the Linux kernel

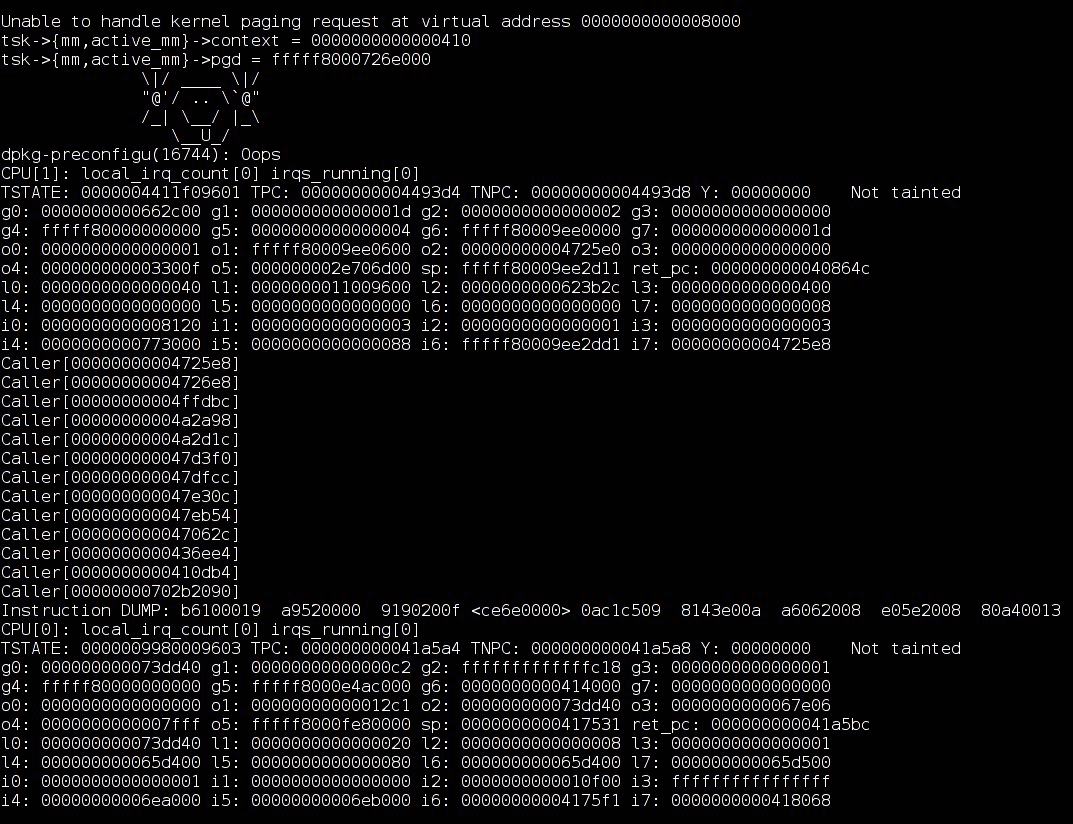
Linux kernel oops on SPARC

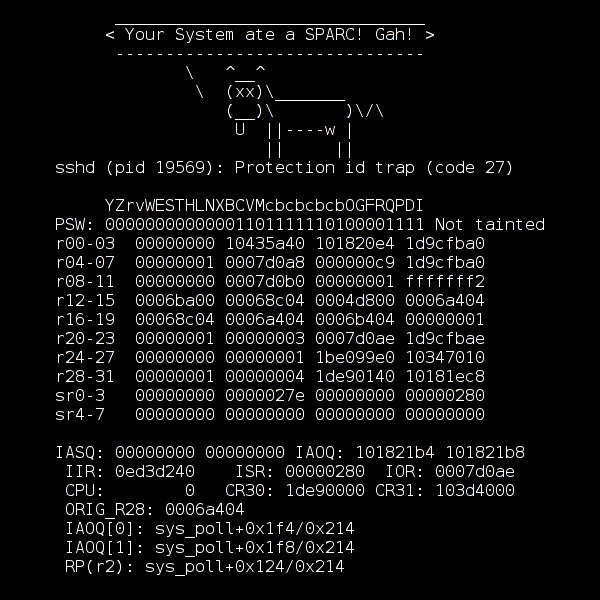
Linux kernel oops on PA-RISC with a dead ASCII cow

In computing, an oops is a serious but non-fatal error in the Linux kernel. An oops may precede a kernel panic, but it may also allow continued operation with compromised reliability. The term does not stand for anything, other than that it is a simple mistake.

== Functioning ==
When the kernel detects a problem, it kills any offending processes and prints an oops message, which Linux kernel engineers can use in debugging the condition that created the oops and fixing the underlying programming error. After a system has experienced an oops, some internal resources may no longer be operational. Thus, even if the system appears to work correctly, undesirable side effects may have resulted from the active task being killed. A kernel oops often leads to a kernel panic when the system attempts to use resources that have been lost. Some kernels are configured to panic when many oopses (10,000 by default) have occurred. This oops limit is due to the potential, for example, for attackers to repeatedly trigger an oops and an associated resource leak, which eventually overflows an integer and allows further exploitation.

The official Linux kernel documentation regarding oops messages resides in the file Documentation/admin-guide/bug-hunting.rst of the kernel sources. Some logger configurations may affect the ability to collect oops messages. The kerneloops software can collect and submit kernel oopses to a repository such as the www.kerneloops.org website, which provides statistics and public access to reported oopses.

A simplified crash screen was introduced in Linux 6.10, similar to the Blue Screen of Death on Windows.

== See also ==
- kdump (Linux) – Linux kernel's crash dump mechanism, which internally uses kexec
- System.map – contains mappings between symbol names and their addresses in memory, used to interpret oopses
