= Debugfs =

RAM-based Linux file system

debugfs is a special file system available in the Linux kernel since version 2.6.10-rc3. It was written by Greg Kroah-Hartman.

debugfs is a simple-to-use RAM-based file system specially designed for debugging purposes. It exists as a simple way for kernel developers to make information available to user space. Unlike /proc, which is only meant for information about a process, or sysfs, which has strict one-value-per-file rules, debugfs has no rules at all. Developers can put any information they want there.

== Use ==
To compile a Linux kernel with the debugfs facility, the CONFIG_DEBUG_FS option must be set to yes. It is typically mounted at /sys/kernel/debug with a command such as:

mount -t debugfs none /sys/kernel/debug

It can be manipulated using several calls from the C header file linux/debugfs.h, which include:

- debugfs_create_file – for creating a file in the debug filesystem.
- debugfs_create_dir – for creating a directory inside the debug filesystem.
- debugfs_create_symlink – for creating a symbolic link inside the debug filesystem.
- debugfs_remove – for removing a debugfs entry from the debug filesystem.
