= Kexec =

Linux kernel mechanism

kexec (kernel execute), analogous to the Unix/Linux kernel call exec, is a mechanism of the Linux kernel that allows booting of a new kernel from the currently running one.

== Details ==
Essentially, kexec skips the bootloader stage and hardware initialization phase performed by the system firmware (BIOS or UEFI), and directly loads the new kernel into main memory and starts executing it immediately. This avoids the long times associated with a full reboot, and can help systems to meet high-availability requirements by minimizing downtime.

While feasible, implementing a mechanism such as kexec raises two major challenges:

- Memory of the currently running kernel is overwritten by the new kernel, while the old one is still executing.
- The new kernel will usually expect all hardware devices to be in a well defined state, in which they are after a system reboot because the system firmware resets them to a "sane" state. Bypassing a real reboot may leave devices in an unknown state, and the new kernel will have to recover from that.

Support for allowing only signed kernels to be booted through kexec was merged into version 3.17 of the Linux kernel mainline, which was released on October 5, 2014. This disallows a root user to load arbitrary code via kexec and execute it, complementing the UEFI secure boot and in-kernel security mechanisms for ensuring that only signed Linux kernel modules can be inserted into the running kernel.

Kexec is used by LinuxBoot to boot the main kernel from the Linux kernel located in the firmware.

== See also ==
- kdump (Linux) – Linux kernel's crash dump mechanism, which internally uses kexec
- kGraft – Linux kernel live patching technology developed by SUSE
- kpatch – Linux kernel live patching technology developed by Red Hat
- Ksplice – Linux kernel live patching technology developed by Ksplice, Inc. and later bought by Oracle
