= Greg Kroah-Hartman =

American Linux kernel developer

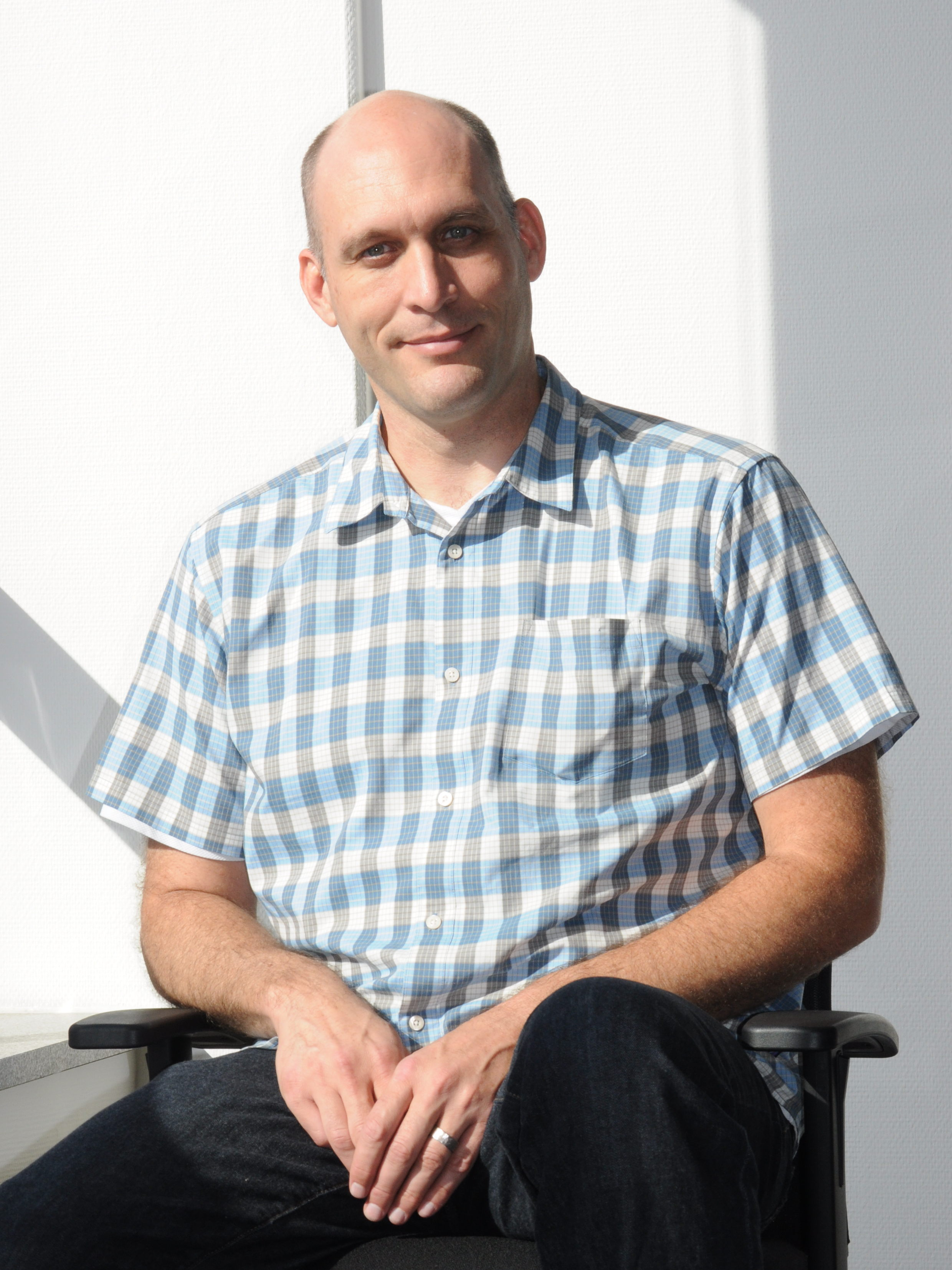
- Greg Kroah-Hartman at SUSE Offices in Nuremberg, Germany, in September 2011
- Other name: Greg KH
- Occupation: Programmer
- Employer: Linux Foundation
- Website: www.kroah.com

Greg Kroah-Hartman is a major Linux kernel developer. As of April 2013, he is the Linux kernel maintainer for the -stable branch, the staging subsystem, USB, driver core, debugfs, kref, kobject, and the sysfs kernel subsystems, Userspace I/O (with Hans J. Koch), and TTY layer. He also created linux-hotplug, the udev project, and the Linux Driver Project. He worked for Novell in the SUSE Labs division and, as of 1 February 2012, works at the Linux Foundation.

== Biography ==
Kroah-Hartman is a co-author of Linux Device Drivers (3rd Edition) and author of Linux Kernel in a Nutshell, and used to be a contributing editor for Linux Journal. He also contributes articles to LWN.net, the Linux news site.

Kroah-Hartman frequently helps in the documentation of the kernel and driver development through talks and tutorials. In 2006, he released a CD image of material to introduce a programmer to working on Linux device driver development.

He also initiated the development of openSUSE Tumbleweed, the rolling release model edition of openSUSE.

== Books ==
- Kroah-Hartman, Greg (2001). Linux Driver Subsystem Programming. O'Reilly Media, Incorporated. ISBN 978-0-596-00533-7.
- Corbet, Jonathan; Rubini, Alessandro; Kroah-Hartman, Greg (2005). Linux Device Drivers (3rd ed.). Sebastopol, CA: O'Reilly. ISBN 978-0-596-00590-0.
- Kroah-Hartman, Greg (2006). Linux Kernel in a Nutshell (1st ed.). Sebastopol, CA: O'Reilly. ISBN 978-0-596-10079-7.
- Oram, Andy; Wilson, Greg (2007). Beautiful Code. ISBN 978-0-596-51004-6.
