= Cylinder 1024 =

Cylinder 1024 is the first cylinder of a hard disk that was inaccessible in the original IBM PC compatible hardware specification, interrupt 13h, which uses cylinder-head-sector addressing. At boot time, the BIOS of many very old PCs could only access the first 1024 cylinders, numbered 0 to 1023, as the specific CHS addressing used by the BIOS interrupt 13 API only defines 10 bits for the cylinder count (2^10=1024).

This was a problem for operating systems on the x86 platform as the BIOS must be able to load the bootloader and the entire kernel image into memory. Both of these must, therefore, be located on the first 1024 cylinders of the disk.

Older versions of Microsoft Windows resolved this by necessitating that the operating system was installed to the first partition. Partly because of this bug, users of the Linux operating system have traditionally created a /boot partition to reside within the first 1024 cylinders of the disk, containing little more than the kernel and bootloader.

== See also ==
- Cylinders 0 to 79 of an Amiga Disk File (ADF)
