= Pool =

Pool may refer to:

== Bodies of water ==
- Pond, largely synonymous
- Swimming pool, usually an artificial structure containing a large body of water intended for swimming
- Reflecting pool, a shallow pool designed to reflect a structure and its surroundings
- Tide pool, a rocky pool on an ocean shore that remains filled with seawater when the tide goes out
- Salt pannes and pools, a water-retaining depression located within salt and brackish marshes
- Plunge pool, a small, deep body of water
- Stream pool, a quiet slow-moving portion of a stream
- Spent fuel pool, a storage facility for used fuel rods from a nuclear reactor
- Vernal pools, seasonal pools of water that provide habitat for distinctive plants and animals

== Sports and gambling ==
- Pool (cards), the common pot for stakes or the stakes themselves in card games
- Pool (dominoes), the stock or boneyard in dominoes
- Pool (cue sports), a group of games played on a pool table
- Pool (poker) or pot (poker), money wagered during a single hand of poker
- Pool betting or parimutuel betting, a betting system in which all bets of a particular type are placed together
  - Betting pool, a form of pool betting where gamblers pay a fixed price into a pool
    - Football pool, an association football (soccer) betting pool
- Pool play or group stages, the round-robin stage of many sporting championships
- Singapore Pools, Singapore's national lottery

== Computing ==
- Pool (computer science), a set of initialized resources that are kept ready to use
- Connection pool, a cache of database connections maintained by the database
- Memory pool, a dynamic memory allocation method
  - Memory Pool System, a memory management system by Harlequin
- Object pool pattern, a pattern to construct sets of initialized programming objects that are kept ready to use
- Thread pool pattern, a programming method where a number of threads are created to perform a number of tasks
- Pooling layer, a form of non-linear down-sampling in convolutional neural networks

== Arts and entertainment ==
=== Music ===
- Pool (John Zorn album), 1980
- Pool (Porches album), 2016
- "Pool", a 2017 song by Paramore from the album After Laughter
- "Pools", a 2014 song by Glass Animals from the album Zaba
- "Pools", a 2017 song by Sløtface from the album Try Not to Freak Out

=== Film ===
- Pool (film) (Indonesian: Kolam), a 2007 short film
- Pools (film), 2025 American film, written and directed by Sam Hayes
- The Pool (2001 film), German horror film also known as Swimming Pool
- The Pool (2007 film), co-written and directed by Chris Smith
- The Pool (2009 film), adaptation of the 2006 play
- The Pool (2018 film), Thai survival thriller

=== Video games ===
- Pool (video game), a 1983 sports game
- Pools (video game), a 2024 horror walking simulator

=== Other uses in arts and entertainment ===
- ABC Pool, a defunct Australian Broadcasting Corporation social media site
- The Pool (play), by James Brough and Helen Elizabeth, 2006
- "The Pool", an episode of the TV series Mayor of Kingstown, in season 2 (2023)
- The Pool (magazine), a defunct online women's magazine

== Places ==
=== England ===
- Pool, Cornwall, on the mainland
- Pool, Isles of Scilly, a location in Cornwall
- Pool-in-Wharfedale, in West Yorkshire
- Pool of London, a stretch of the River Thames
- River Pool (London), a river in England, tributary to the River Ravensbourne
- River Pool, Cumbria, a river in Cumbria, England, tributary to the Gilpin

=== United States ===
- Pool, West Virginia, US
- The Pool (Central Park) in Manhattan, New York, US

=== Congo ===
- Pool Department, a division of the Republic of the Congo

== Other uses ==
- Pool (surname), including a list of people with the surname
- Pooling (resource management), grouping together of resources or effort
  - Press pool, group of news gathering organizations pooling their resources
  - Secretarial pool, group of secretaries available to assist executives

== See also ==
- Poel, an island in the Baltic Sea
- Poole (disambiguation)
- Poul, a given name
- Pooling, or group testing, in statistics
