= Pooling (resource management) =

Grouping of resources

In resource management, pooling is the grouping together of resources (assets, equipment, personnel, effort, etc.) for the purposes of maximizing advantage or minimizing risk to the users. The term is used in accounting, finance, computing and equipment management.

== Accounting ==
- In acquisition, pooling of interest was a merger-accounting method that was taken out of the market in the United States by the Financial Accounting Standards Board on June 30, 2001. The method combines the book value of assets and liabilities of the two companies to create the new balance sheet of the combined companies.

== Finance ==
Pooling is the grouping together of assets, and related strategies for minimizing risk. For example:

- Asset-backed securities (ABS) is a security whose income payments are backed by a specified pool of underlying assets.
- Mortgage-backed securities (MBS) is a type of asset-backed security whereas the underlying assets are mortgages.

Debt instruments with similar characteristics can be pooled into a new security, for example:

- Collateralized debt obligations (CDO) is a type of structured asset-backed security (ABS).
- Collateralized mortgage obligations (CMO) is a type of complex debt security that repackages and directs the payments of principal and interest from a collateral pool to different types and maturities of securities, thereby meeting investor needs.

In general, pooling different assets or debt-like obligations into a new security is called securitization, a practice commonly used by structured finance.

== Supply chain management ==
- Intergovernmental risk pool is the use of the risk pool risk management technique commonly practiced by private insurance companies, but applied to public entities (e.g. made up of government agencies, school districts, county governments and municipalities) who come together to form a pool to provide protection against catastrophic risks such as floods or earthquakes.

== Computing ==
Pooling IT (equipment and staff) resources involves virtualization of typical IT stacks server, storage and networking (but also on the level of datacenter power and cooling). Users benefit from lower individual investments since resources are shared. Although shared infrastructures have huge benefits potential issues on the environment have impact on the complete environment. A thorough analysis of the infrastructure is recommended to identify potential single point of failure (SPOF). One may opt for 'private' instances (private clouds) for specific needs or for specific reasons. On the level of resource pooling, bigger suppliers tend to have the benefit of being able to provide shared support environments with round the clock service. Do you prefer access to a service desk round the clock with potential less expertise or do you want to rely on a single support engineer (who is 'on duty' during off peak hours)"

- Memory pooling is the use of a pool for memory management that allows dynamic memory allocation by preallocating a number of memory blocks with the same size called the memory pool, and is an alternative to dynamic memory allocation by techniques such as malloc and C++'s operator new which can suffer from fragmentation because of variable block sizes.
- Thread pooling is a software design pattern for achieving concurrency of execution in a computer program by maintaining a pool of multiple threads waiting for tasks to be allocated for concurrent execution by a supervising program, and increases performance and avoids latency due to frequent creation and destruction of threads for short-lived tasks
- Object pooling is a software design pattern that keeps a pool of initialized objects ready that are ready to be used, rather than allocating and destroying them on demand.
- Connection pooling in computer science is a caching technique used to enhance the performance of executing commands on a database.

The resource management concepts of pooling can easily be abstracted and virtualized.

== Equipment ==
Pooling of equipment is used to maintain "ready for use" equipment while damaged or dirty equipment is repaired and cleaned, by replacing it with an identical piece of equipment from the pool.

== Automotive ==
Carpooling is sharing of car journeys so that not all of the persons need to drive to a location themselves.

== See also ==
- Pool (disambiguation)
