= 1984 Summer Olympics boycott =

- Part of the Olympic Games boycotts
- The 15 Eastern Bloc countries which boycotted the 1984 Games are shaded blue; the 4 Non‑Aligned countries which boycotted are shaded teal
- Date: July 28 – August 12, 1984 (42 years ago)
- Location: Games of the XXIII Olympiad; Los Angeles, California, USA
- Caused by: U.S.-Soviet Cold War rivalry; 1980 Summer Olympics boycott; 1984 England rugby union tour of South Africa (Upper Volta Ethiopia); Isolationist policies (Albania); Misc. political enmities (Iran Libya)
- Methods: Boycott; Disinformation campaign

Parties
Boycotting countries; Eastern Bloc; Soviet Union; Afghanistan; Angola; Bulgaria; Cuba; Czechoslovakia; Ethiopia; East Germany; Hungary; North Korea; Laos; Mongolia; Poland; Vietnam; South Yemen; Non‑Aligned (Note: While Iran, Libya, and Upper Volta/Burkina Faso were—and still are—official members of the Non-Aligned Movement (NAM), Albania was never formally part of that group. Albania's leader, Enver Hoxha, viewed the NAM's proclaimed status of non-alignment as false, saying he found the "political, ideological, economic and military alignment" of the NAM with "the superpowers and developed capitalist countries" to be "an undeniable fact". Hoxha described Albania as having "avoided this grip", and as a consequence, "it is considered as 'isolated' from the world by the defenders of the imperialist plunder", with Albanians "not at all worried by this nickname put to us".); Albania; Iran; Libya; Upper Volta	Host country; United States; NGOs; (Los Angeles) LAOOC; IOC

Lead figures
(Soviet Union) Konstantin Chernenko; (Soviet Union) Marat Gramov	(United States) Ronald Reagan; (Los Angeles) Peter Ueberroth; (International Olympic Committee) Juan A. Samaranch

Number
Boycotting athletes: 1,700+	

The boycott of the 1984 Summer Olympics in Los Angeles followed four years after the American-led boycott of the 1980 Summer Olympics in Moscow. The boycott involved nineteen countries: fifteen from the Eastern Bloc led by the Soviet Union, which initiated the boycott on May 8, 1984; and four non‑aligned countries which boycotted on their own initiatives. The boycotting countries organized alternative sporting events called the Friendship Games which were held in various Eastern Bloc countries from July to September 1984. Although the boycott affected Olympic events that were normally dominated by the absent countries, 140 nations still took part in the Los Angeles Games, which was a record at the time.

Since the announcement by U.S. president Carter of the boycott of the Olympic Games in Moscow in 1980, there was fear from United States officials that a reciprocal boycott could occur during the 1984 Games, scheduled for Los Angeles. The Soviets for their part gave sparsely few indications that this would happen, and indeed, from formalized talks which occurred over the course of three years, indicators seemed to point towards Soviet participation. Only in the last year before the Games began did a sense of non-participation come about.

During that final year, the loss of Korean Air Lines Flight 007 and the subsequent vitriol directed at the Soviets by various activist groups which formed in the aftermath of the flight's destruction seriously hampered relations between the two committees tasked with coordinating Soviet attendance, the Los Angeles Olympic Organizing Committee (LAOOC) and the Soviet National Olympic Committee (Soviet NOC). Their faltering relations did not improve with the ascension of Konstantin Chernenko to the post of General Secretary of the Soviet Union in February 1984. Chernenko was a close acolyte of Leonid Brezhnev and therefore predisposed to avoiding Los Angeles due to the 1980 boycott. American reticence in dealing with anti-Soviet activists coupled with American mishandling of the Soviets' Olympic attaché, incentivized the Soviets enough in their view to justify boycotting the Games. Most of the Soviet-allied nations of the Eastern Bloc joined the boycott in solidarity, despite the decision being hugely unpopular amongst Bloc countries with significant prior Olympic medal winnings.

== Leadup to boycott ==
=== California legislative response to KAL 007 ===
On September 16, 1983, the California State Assembly and California State Senate approved Senate Joint Resolution 31, a measure urging President Ronald Reagan to ban the Soviets from participating in the Los Angeles Games. The non-binding resolution was hurriedly put forth by California State Senator John Doolittle in response to the Soviet shootdown of Korean Air Lines Flight 007 just 15 days prior. The resolution was reportedly amended to include the Olympic banning clause in the waning moments of the legislative session and that most of those voting for it did not know of the clause's inclusion. The only American Olympic official to speak out against the legislation was F. Don Miller, Executive Director of the U.S. Olympic Committee, who criticized what he termed "narrow‑minded legislators for trying to use the Olympics in American foreign policy". LAOOC President Peter Ueberroth and LAOOC Chairman Paul Ziffren both remained silent on passage of the legislation, saying they felt the best response was to "say nothing". In February 1984, the California State Senate advanced a bill to rescind the earlier legislation. The newer measure welcomed athletes from all nations to the Games and urged Californians to "be gracious hosts to all competitors".

=== Ban the Soviets Coalition ===
Another response to the shootdown of KAL 007 was the creation of a group calling itself Ban the Soviets Coalition. Formed by evangelical Christian writer David Balsiger—a self-described "maverick Republican"—and three other Southern California businessmen approximately one month after the flight's destruction, the Coalition's first effort was to petition President Reagan to support a ban on the Soviets attending the Olympic Games. Petitions labeled "We Cannot Forget Them" invoking the passengers and crew killed aboard KAL 007 were distributed to the public with a request for assistance in persuading lawmakers to agree to the endeavor. The Coalition initially estimated getting 1 million signatures from the public, but after thirty days, found they had gathered only 1% of that number.

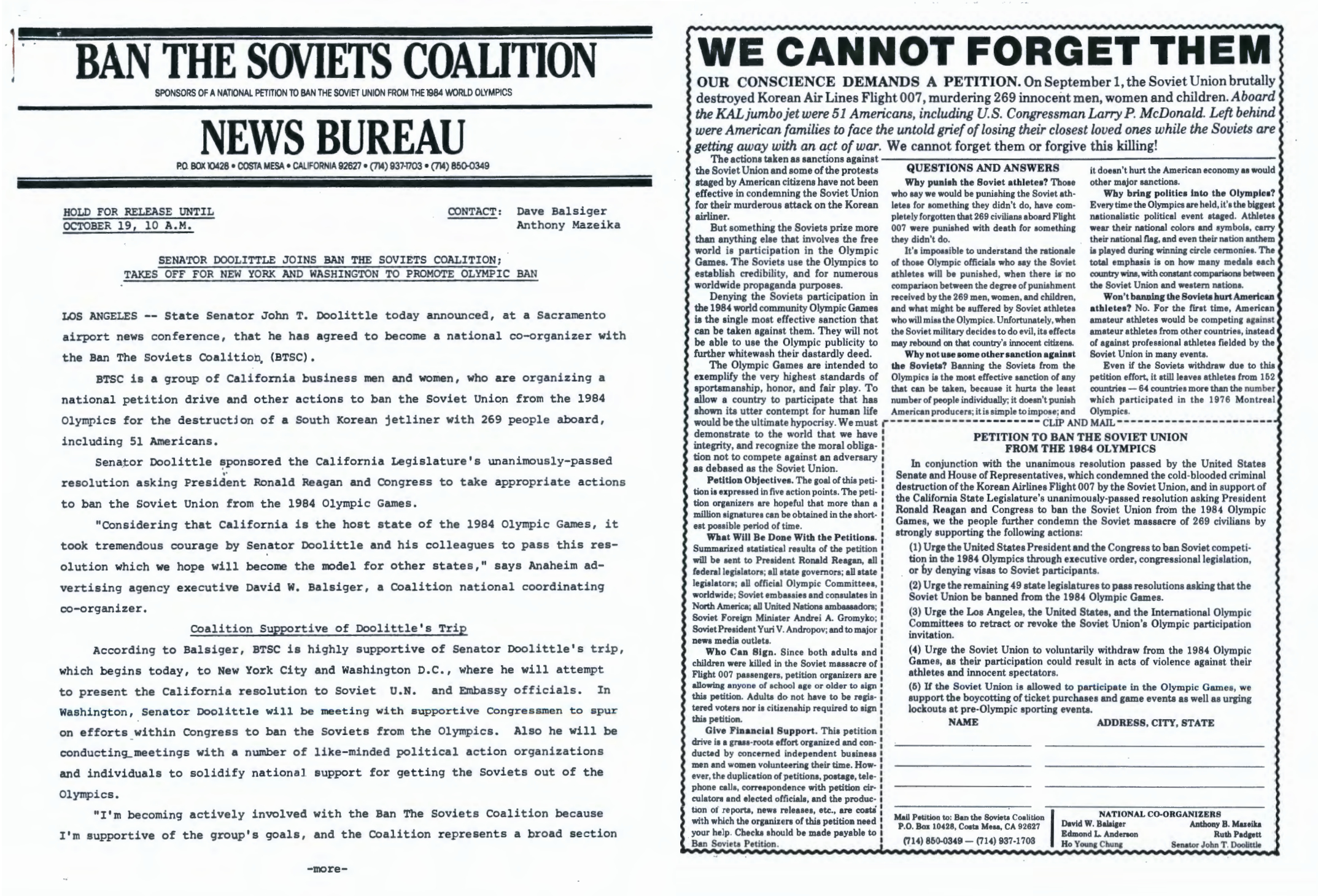
Ban the Soviets Coalition distributed petitions labeled "We Cannot Forget Them", invoking those killed aboard Korean Air Lines Flight 007 and urging President Reagan to ban the Soviets from attending the Games

Seeking a more direct approach, the Coalition wrote to White House Deputy Chief of Staff Michael Deaver advising him that nearly all members of the Coalition were "the same groups that made the difference in Reagan going to the White House", groups who supported him because of his "strong anti-Communist stand and his firm position on moral, family, and Judeo-Christian issues". The letter cited unnamed national opinion polls that reportedly showed "70 million Americans supporting a ban on the Soviets" and also conveyed the Coalition's concerns regarding proposed Soviet Olympic arrangements which the Coalition felt would "introduce adverse security implications" for the United States. Deaver's response was that the U.S. intended to honor the Olympic Charter, whose provisions prevented host countries from banning other nation's athletes, and that the U.S. would "carefully consider any security implications".

Upon realizing that Reagan would not support a ban, the Coalition turned to more provocative actions, including sending letters to Soviet Olympic officials warning that their athletes might be physically harmed. These efforts brought the Coalition outsized media attention in the United States and abroad, while the LAOOC, along with the Reagan Administration, refrained from publicly denouncing their activities. Faced with increasing threats from the Coalition and silence from the LAOOC and the White House, the Soviets took their concerns to the U.S. State Department, who instead warned the Soviets about the publicity Soviet media was beginning to devote to Ban the Soviets Coalition, as it was generating "far more interest and U.S. press coverage of this insignificant group than it could have ever achieved on its own." The Soviets requested that the State Department ban demonstrations against Soviet athletes while also suggesting that Balsiger be forcibly removed from Los Angeles to "a remote and quiet place", leaving Deputy U.S. Secretary of State Kenneth Dam to ask "What more do they want, other than to change Los Angeles into a miniature of the Soviet Union?"

In early April 1984, members of the Coalition met at a private home in the genteel residential enclave of Hancock Park, in Los Angeles, to discuss erecting billboards along freeways that the Soviet athletes would travel during the Games as a means of encouraging defection, saying they hoped to establish 500 safe houses for any defectors. This spurred LAOOC President Ueberroth to belatedly begin reassuring the Soviets, first by telling them that the California legislation was unimportant because of the "scatterbrained way it was adopted", and second, by dismissing the Coalition as "fringe extremists, not a legitimate threat to athletes". Near the end of April 1984, the Coalition began boasting to the media that they had infiltrated the LAOOC with operatives who were preparing to assist any Soviet athletes who came to the Games and wished to defect, prompting Ueberroth to publicly label the group's leader Balsiger as "nutty". This led to the Coalition threatening to boycott all major Olympic Games' corporate sponsors if no public apology were forthcoming from Ueberroth. Ueberroth replied that he would "apologize if they'd change their name to a proper one ... maybe call themselves the Coalition to Hurt Athletes or maybe the Coalition to Play into the Hands of the Soviets."

Los Angeles Police Chief Daryl Gates said of the Coalition, "I respect that group's First Amendment right to do what they are doing, but I can tell you that the Russian athletes would never be aware of theirs or any other peaceful demonstrations". Gates and Ueberroth did not share the Soviets' perception of the Coalition as a large and formidable threat, with Gates stating he "couldn't believe that the Russians would be intimidated by a tiny group like the Ban the Soviets Coalition" and Ueberroth saying the Coalition's entire membership "could all fit in a station wagon and drive south, and it would be the end of it".

=== Preliminary positive meetings ===
In spite of strong American reactions to the Korean Air Lines incident, several positive encounters signaling a likely Soviet attendance still preceded the Games. During the Summer of 1983 the Soviets signed a $3 million dollar television contract to broadcast the Games in the Soviet Union. In December 1983, a meeting of officials representing the LAOOC and 14 members of the Soviet NOC took place in Los Angeles, resulting in the signing of a protocol agreement concerning Soviet expectations for participation. At that time, the chairman of the Soviet NOC, Marat Gramov, communicated his view of the upcoming Summer Games as being positive, and that he "saw no reason why the Soviet Union should not participate". One month later in January 1984, a second Soviet delegation visited Los Angeles to meet with the International Olympic Committee (IOC)'s Executive Commission. This meeting was also viewed positively, with no mention of boycotts being made at that time. A final, positively viewed meeting was held during the IOC's 87th Session on February 5, 1984, in Sarajevo, three days before the start of the Sarajevo Winter Olympic Games. During that meeting, Soviet IOC member Konstantin Andrianov offered congratulations to the LAOOC, saying they were doing "a great job". Four days later on February 9, 1984, the General Secretary of the Communist Party of the Soviet Union, Yuri Andropov, died.

=== Yermishkin visa denial ===
On March 2, 1984, the Soviets' proposed-Olympic attaché, Oleg Yermishkin, was denied an entry visa from the U.S. State Department, which identified him as an operational officer of the KGB. The LAOOC expressed consternation towards the State Department's decision on what the LAOOC considered to be a "minor issue", saying that it should not have been at all surprising that the Soviets, who had security concerns, would have wanted as their Olympic attaché, someone who was experienced in security matters directing the preparations for their team. After all, the LAOOC noted, the Israeli and Turkish delegations also had intelligence personnel involved as attachés in the preparations for their teams. LAOOC President Ueberroth, relying on assurances he said he received from the Reagan Administration, told the Soviets in Sarajevo that Yermishkin would be acceptable and that they should go ahead and proceed formally with his visa application. Although preparations for Yermishkin's arrival were ongoing for the past 5 months, the denial of his travel visa occurred on the very day he was set to travel to Los Angeles.

David Simon, the LAOOC's chief of government relations, said of Yermishkin's visa denial:

"It was the first time that I can recall where we really had egg on our face, where Ueberroth basically gave them his word that this was going to be the case and then had to retract it a couple of weeks later when Yermishkin was turned down. That's the one thing where the Soviets really had a right to be angry with us."

— David Simon, LAOOC Government Relations Chief

=== Soviet NOC criticisms ===
On April 9, the Soviet NOC released their first statement voicing criticisms concerning preparations for the Los Angeles Olympic Games. In response, IOC President Juan Antonio Samaranch convened a meeting of the IOC Executive Commission on April 24, 1984 at the IOC main office in Lausanne. Peter Ueberroth attended as representative of the LAOOC, with Marat Gramov representing the Soviet NOC. During the meeting, Gramov revealed for the first time that the "Soviet NOC had received declarations and letters from various nationalistic and terrorist groups and organizations with threats". In light of these threats, Gramov made four requests of the LAOOC covering entry into the United States, security, Soviet delegation and media access to Olympic sites, and the use of Aeroflot charter flights. (Note: The Soviets were obligated to seek special dispensation to use Aeroflot as a ferry for their athletes owing to a prohibition on the carrier flying routes to and from the United States which took effect in January 1982. That prohibition, which was instituted by Reagan following the Polish declaration of martial law in December 1981, also applied to LOT Polish Airlines.) Gramov also requested use of the Soviet cruise ship MS Gruziya (Note: The Soviets traditionally had agreements with Olympic host countries allowing their ships to anchor nearby as main supply bases for Soviet athletes, with a ship docking in the Port of Montreal during the 1976 Games, the M.Uritskiy docking in Tokyo Bay during the 1964 Games, the MS Mikhail Sholokhov docking in the Korean port of Incheon during the 1988 Games, and another ship—coincidentally called the Gruzia—docking in the Port of Melbourne during the 1956 Games.) for equipment storage, recreational space, and lodging for Soviet personnel other than athletes and trainers (who instead, would reside in Rieber Hall at UCLA).

According to the LAOOC, "the parties also discussed other minor matters and agreed that all matters regarding the participation of any NOC could be resolved through dealing directly with the LAOOC only." In addition, the Soviet NOC stated that it "intended to participate in the Games of the XXIII Olympiad in Los Angeles under the condition that the Olympic Charter is enforced". Both the LAOOC and the Soviet NOC agreed to communicate more often in the future. However, following the meeting, the LAOOC sent daily telexes to the Soviet NOC for several days, but received no response. The LAOOC stated that "although the meeting itself had been encouraging, the lack of response by the USSR NOC to these messages was a clear cause for worry."

=== National Security Decision Directive No. 135 ===
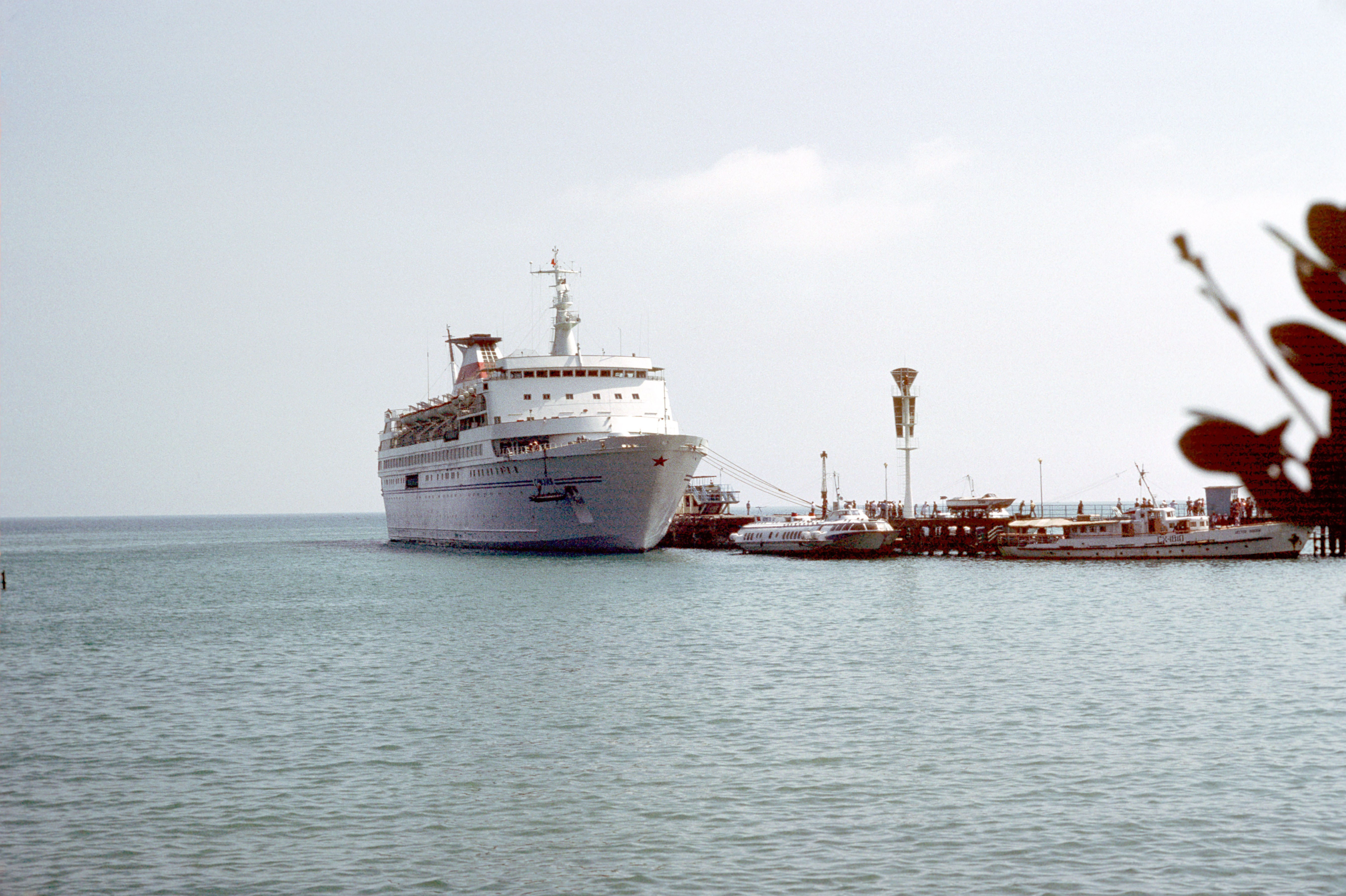
The Soviet cruise ship MS Gruziya received permission to dock in Long Beach Harbor for the duration of the Games upon Reagan's signature of National Security Decision Directive No. 135

Anticipating Gramov's request for accommodations, Reagan had already signed National Security Decision Directive No. 135 on March 27, 1984, which addressed two of those requests: approval of Aeroflot flights to Los Angeles and permission for the docking of the MS Gruziya in Long Beach Harbor.

The directive stated:

"This Directive delineates the counterintelligence and security precautions the United States Government will take. ... We will ensure the safe passage of Soviet Aeroflot flights to and from our country for the Soviet 'Olympic Family' (i.e., those Soviets, including a reasonable number of spectators, directly involved in the Games) and for the visit of the Soviet vessel Gruziya to the Long Beach Harbor area."

— NSDD No. 135, March 26, 1984

Soviet flights using Aeroflot would be monitored by the FAA under guidance from the Overflight Security Committee, and the Gruziya would be treated as a commercial 'Soviet Special Interest Vessel', subject to boarding and searches by the U.S. Coast Guard. Radio transmissions from the vessel would be prohibited while docked at Pier 2, Berth 52 from July 15 until August 15, 1984. Michael Deaver had originally specified Berth 53, however, the Coast Guard preferred Berth 52 as "easier to protect seaward and landward" since 52 was completely isolated from ongoing commercial activities such as restaurants and charter fishing boats, both of which were nearby 53. Berth 52 was not without issue, as using it would have rendered Berth 50 inaccessible—located across a narrow channel from 52—with the Gruziya deemed too wide to permit another ship docking simultaneously. Shipping agents working with the White House, the Coast Guard, Long Beach Port Authority and Long Beach Police Department were well into the process of negotiating the berthing logistics needed to satisfy the security mandates of NSDD No. 135 by mid-April. The level of detail placed into pre‑planning the ship's docking was noted by historians as rare evidence of Reagan's sincerity in accommodating Soviet requests, with the Directive he signed "designed to accommodate the Soviet requests while ensuring the sovereignty of U.S. authority over any potential security risks".

While the directive went to great lengths to address two of the Soviets' concerns, it abrogated any American effort to mitigate groups such as Ban the Soviets Coalition, as their activities were seen at best being protected by the First Amendment and, at worst, as a minor irritant.

As Gramov made clear at the IOC meeting of April 24, provocations from activist groups were viewed as anything but minor by the Soviets. On April 29, 1984, Gramov sent a letter to the Communist Party Central Committee in which he described the risk of anti-Soviet organizations using violence during the Games, therefore potentially encouraging participating Soviet athletes to come to their side. The document also included a statement that "participation in the Games would be difficult if the hostile activities were not ceased", and that the absence of the Soviet Union and other developing countries would "bring the first 'commercial Olympics' to economic catastrophe", and concluded that "if the [safety] conditions were not fulfilled, we will resign from participating".

== Soviets initiate the boycott ==
The Soviet Union announced its intentions to boycott the 1984 Summer Olympics on May 8, 1984, claiming "security concerns and chauvinistic sentiments and an anti-Soviet hysteria being whipped up in the United States". The Soviets' main cited reason for the boycott was their security concerns over the safety of their athletes. Specifically mentioned in their announcement was "the anti-Soviet campaign launched by reactionary circles in the United States with the connivance of the official authorities"; an allegation that "the U.S. authorities continue ... to interfere in affairs belonging exclusively to the competence of the LAOOC"; as well as an allegation that "extremist organizations and groupings of all sorts [are] openly aiming to create unbearable conditions for the stay of the Soviet delegation and for the performance by Soviet sportsmen" and that these extremist organizations "have sharply stepped up their activity with direct connivance of the American authorities". Among those groups implicitly referred to in their announcement was Ban the Soviets Coalition. The boycott announcement stated that the IOC purportedly investigated the Soviet allegations and found them to be "just and substantiated".

In a meeting with Soviet Ambassador Dobrynin on May 10, 1984, Secretary of State Shultz addressed each point brought up in the Soviet boycott announcement:

"They have alleged through TASS that at the April 24 Lausanne meeting, the IOC found the complaints of their Olympic Committee to be just and substantiated; that U.S. authorities continued to interfere in affairs within the exclusive competence of the Los Angeles Committee; and that U.S. authorities were conniving with extremist organizations which aim to create 'unbearable conditions' for their delegation and athletes. The facts, I said, are that the IOC did not make the finding TASS describes; that the U.S. Government has not interfered in LAOOC affairs (nor has the LAOOC ever claimed it has), but has worked with the LAOOC on issues within the sole competence of the U.S. Government at the committee's request; and that there has been no connivance with nor encouragement of these groups, that we have bent over backwards to meet all Soviet concerns, and have met them. I said I could run through a long list of facts about the tremendous effort we had made to meet Soviet concerns. For instance, we would have 17,000 people involved in Olympic security, and we were prepared to spend up to $50 million to assure it, including $500,000 for the Soviet ship alone. We had taken every imaginable step to ensure that Soviet athletes were safe and able to compete in the Olympics."

— Secretary of State Shultz, May 11, 1984

After the Soviet announcement was made, a meeting of the IOC Executive Board was held on May 18–19 in Lausanne with officials from both the LAOOC and Soviet NOC. The purpose of this meeting was to identify specific examples of threats mentioned by the Soviets in their announcement, as well as to inquire from the Soviets in a last-ditch effort whether there were any possible conditions which might lead to participation. The Soviets in response gave no specific reasons other than the broad charges they previously stated, and they refused to specify any conditions under which they would come to Los Angeles for the Games. The LAOOC surmised that this omission of specifics, coupled with the ideological make-up of the countries which joined the boycott, strongly suggested that the two major motives behind the decision were retribution for the U.S.-led boycott of the 1980 Olympic Games and Soviet dissatisfaction with the foreign policy agenda of the Reagan Administration.

=== Impact of Reagan's foreign policy agenda on Soviet withdrawal ===
Despite Shultz's assertions that the United States had "bent over backwards to meet all Soviet concerns, and have met them", the Reagan Administration's foreign policy agenda, laid out in January 1983 in National Security Decision Directive No. 75—informally known as the Reagan Doctrine—complicated U.S. responses to Soviet concerns. The directive stated that the primary focus of American foreign policy would be to "contain and over time reverse Soviet expansionism by competing with Moscow in military power and in international diplomacy" as well as through economical warfare, with the goal of "promoting a process of change in the Soviet Union toward a more pluralistic political and economic system". In NSDD No. 75, Reagan's foreign policy was designed to perpetuate confrontation with the Soviets at every level of engagement, with the ultimate goal being the collapse of their system of government. The antagonism inherent in this type of agenda ran counter to the IOC and the LAOOC's goals of ensuring Soviet participation in the Games.

According to Ueberroth the dueling nature in how the Reagan Administration was expected to treat the Soviets vis-à-vis the Olympics, and how they were treated vis-à-vis the Administration's foreign policy agenda, fostered a sort of inefficiency in White House and State Department dealings with the LAOOC:

"Publicly I covered for White House inefficiency ... privately, I resented remarks made by the State Department officials that I was out of line for making deals with the Soviet NOC. This lack of coordination and communications among government agencies continued to plague me as it affected every important facet of the Games. The Olympic Games were obviously not a high priority for either the Reagan Administration or the State Department."

— Peter Ueberroth, LAOOC President

Ueberroth cited Oleg Yermishkin's visa denial as well as poorly-worded communications from the State Department which the Soviets took to mean as visa requirements for Soviet athletes (Note: The State Department erroneously used the word 'visa' in a description of entry procedures sent to the Soviet Foreign Office from the U.S. Embassy in Moscow along with a request for a list of Soviet athletes and family who were travelling to the Games. While the list was needed to 'weed out known terrorists', it was not intended for use with travel visas for athletes, who instead were using Olympic identity cards. State Department Counselor Ed Derwinski admitted the mistake to Soviet Embassy Minister‑Counselor Viktor Isakov on April 27, 1984, saying "your foreign ministry has been informed by diplomatic note of a corrected description of entry procedures that should erase all doubts that we would require visas contrary to the Olympic Charter". Eighteen months prior to the visa miscommunication, the State Department had agreed to employ a liaison at the Embassy to proofread all Olympic‑related communiqués with the Soviet Foreign Office. Ueberroth said having a liaison "certainly would have averted this diplomatic blunder", however, the position was never filled.) as evidence of Reagan's confrontational foreign policies constraining Ueberroth's management of the Games. When the State Department's liaison to the LAOOC, Mike McManus, was promoted to White House Communications Director in January 1984, his replacement, Bill Sittman, was surprised to discover a month's worth of Soviet requests sitting untouched on McManus' desk. The State Department had received them, but since no one else at the State Department knew about them, they had not been acted upon. While Shultz publicly claimed to be providing assistance to the Soviets with their concerns, Ueberroth was privy to episodes where interference was more likely to be found:

"Shultz was pretty much oblivious to the Olympics. He was unaware that State Department interference was one of the primary reasons given for the boycott. Since State had inserted itself in the process, I requested that a high-level official appear in Lausanne to explain State's policies and procedures ... Shultz had other ideas. He offered two minor functionaries who possessed the diplomatic clout of Tweedle Dee and Tweedle Dum. What's more, Shultz said they couldn't attend the meetings and were available to me only. I could just see myself telling Samaranch, Gramov and the others, Wait a minute, I have to run upstairs and get the answers from Mr. Dee and Mr. Dum. I told Shultz thanks, but no thanks ... By the end of the meeting, I was disgusted with the U.S. Government and the Russians."

— Peter Ueberroth, LAOOC President

Viktor Cherkashin, Ambassador Dobrynin's assistant at the Soviet Embassy, later described to Jay Moorhead, director of the LAOOC's Washington D.C. office, how "Soviet complaints about commercialization, smog, transportation, security, Ban the Soviets, and whatever were all overshadowed by a much larger problem—the attitude of the United States Government and, specifically, the State Department".

=== IOC assignation of blame ===
On May 31, 1984, IOC President Juan Antonio Samaranch travelled to Moscow in an attempt to meet with Chernenko, however, he was only successful in meeting with Nikolai Talyzin, the First Deputy Chairman of the Council of Ministers, as Chernenko was unavailable. Samaranch, in an interview with the Madrid daily Diario 16, laid blame for the 1984 Soviet-led boycott squarely on one person: former American President Jimmy Carter. According to Samaranch, Carter did the most damage to the Olympic movement, saying "If the United States had gone to Moscow it never would have occurred to the Soviets not to participate in Los Angeles."

== Eastern Bloc joins the boycott ==
In the days following the Soviet announcement, six Eastern Bloc satellite nations in quick succession soon joined in, including Bulgaria, East Germany (on May 10), Mongolia and Vietnam (both May 11), Laos, and Czechoslovakia (both May 13).

Afghanistan declared its withdrawal on May 13, 1984, becoming the eighth country to announce a boycott of the 1984 Summer Olympics.

Hungary and Poland became the ninth and tenth Communist countries to announce boycotts. Hungary claimed the lives of its athletes would be put in danger if they were to spend time in Los Angeles, while Poland said the United States was engaging in a "campaign aimed at disturbing the Games".

On May 23, Cuba became the eleventh country to announce its participation in the boycott. The loss of Cuban athletes was expected to be especially critical in boxing and baseball competitions, prompting Ueberroth to make overtures in the media requesting meetings with Cuban Olympic officials. Ueberroth's eventual trip to Cuba was unsuccessful in persuading Cuban President Castro to rescind his boycott decision.

South Yemen was the twelfth country to announce a boycott on May 27, stating that the organizers of the Los Angeles Olympics "ignore the provisions of the Olympic Charter, refuse to guarantee the safety of sportsmen, and first of all of those [sic] from the Soviet Union and other socialist countries".

Ethiopia announced on June 1 that it would join the Soviet-led boycott. The Soviet News Agency Tass, which communicated the boycott on behalf of the Ethiopian National Olympic Committee (NOC), stated that the step was taken "because the United States uses the games for purely political purposes against socialist and progressive states". Ethiopia's NOC added to the Tass statement that their boycott was also "a resolute protest in connection with the British government's refusal to cancel England's rugby union tour of South Africa".

North Korea was the fourteenth nation to boycott the Olympics on June 3, giving their reason as being a lack of security for their athletes. A dispatch from the Korean Central News Agency said that "taking into consideration the fact that the United States has been hostile and is hostile to us, we cannot but express increasing apprehensions for the personal safety of our sportsmen."

Angola, which was the very last country out of 142 nations to officially accept their invitation to participate in the Summer Olympics, reversed course on June 27, announcing they were pulling out because "the United States authorities are turning the Games into an arena of confrontation". In response, Ueberroth stated that the Soviets were "still trying every possible thing" to pressure more countries into joining their boycott.

== Non‑aligned countries boycotting ==
=== Albania ===
Although originally associated with the Eastern Bloc, by 1968, Albania was in a position of non-alignment. In keeping with Albania's isolationism, the country did not attend any Olympic Games from 1976 to 1988. Politically, Albania allied with China after the Sino-Soviet split, remaining antagonistic towards the Soviet Union; however, it also opposed China's rapprochement with the United States in the late 1970s, resulting in the Sino-Albanian split.

=== Iran ===
A similar antagonism towards both superpowers existed in Iran since 1979. In August 1983 Iran made its first announcement regarding the 1984 Games, saying it would boycott because of "United States interference in the Middle East, its support for the regime occupying Jerusalem, and the crimes being committed by the U.S.A. in Latin America, especially in El Salvador". On January 22, 1984, Iranian Prime Minister Mir-Hossein Mousavi reiterated Iran's decision to boycott, saying "the 1984 Olympic Games of Los Angeles are a mask and facade created by supercilious world powers and the United States for disguising their hideous faces as a means of gaining publicity and whitewashing their crimes", with Mousavi noting how Iran had "boycotted the Moscow Olympics in protest over the Soviet Government's occupation of Afghanistan and it would do the same with the Olympics-84 Games of Los Angeles in order to expose the criminal acts of the world-devouring U.S. Government."

=== Upper Volta ===
In August 1983, a military coup led by Thomas Sankara overthrew the Upper Voltan government in favor of a left-wing military junta advocating a neocolonialist platform of anti-imperialism and agrarian reform. As an official member of the Non-Aligned Movement, Upper Volta enjoyed diplomatic relations with Non-Aligned and Bloc‑affiliated countries—Libya, the Soviet Union, Cuba, Benin, and the People's Republic of Congo—but was not, itself, part of the Eastern Bloc. The only Summer Olympic Games attended by Upper Volta was 1972 in Munich, with Upper Volta subsequently boycotting the 1976 and 1980 Summer Games. On July 13, 1984, the Upper Voltan NOC announced their withdrawal from the L.A. Games, giving their reason as being due to England's rugby union tour of South Africa. Since this was the only reason given, Upper Volta's boycott was largely seen as distinct from those of the Eastern Bloc nations. Upper Volta changed its official name to Burkina Faso on August 4, 1984.

=== Libya ===
Libya withdrew its entire sports delegation of six athletes two days before the start of the Games, apparently in retaliation for the American government's refusal to allow three of that country's journalists to cover the Games. Without elaboration, the official Libyan news agency only stated "The Libyan Arab Jamahiriya decided to withdraw from the Olympic Games in Los Angeles." According to a State Department spokesman, the journalists were denied visas under the U.S. Immigration and Nationality Act for "security reasons". LAOOC President Ueberroth's response was that "it is not for me to speculate whether they are journalists, it is the government's decision ... as a private corporation, we respond to government action". LAOOC Associate Vice‑President Anita DeFrantz was more forthright in her assessment, saying the Libyan journalists "weren't coming to report news; they were coming to create news".

=== El Salvador boycott warning ===
On May 28, 1984, President of the Salvadoran Olympic Committee, Valerio Montes, warned that El Salvador might be forced to join the Soviet-led boycott if the $28,000 entry fee required of its athletes were not raised by the June 2 deadline, a figure which Montes doubted "could be raised in time". The IOC previously offered to pay all expenses for six Salvadoran athletes, but Montes noted that the Salvadorans would refuse the funds in principle in order to show the Salvadoran Government "that it must pay more attention to the nation's youth and sports' programs". Referring to the $62 million recently approved by the U.S. Government for military aid to El Salvador, Montes suggested a possible solution whereby President Reagan and the American Congress would "order the armed forces to give us less than one percent of what has been designated for weapons to be able to participate in the Games". In response, spokesman Donald Hamilton of the U.S. Embassy in San Salvador declined to provide any funds, stating that "since we don't fund our own athletes, we don't see how we could fund those from a foreign country". Montes was instead advised by the embassy spokesman to pursue financial aid from local sources or from the IOC. Ten athletes from El Salvador eventually competed at the Games.

=== Bolivia boycott reversal ===
On June 3, 1984, Bolivian President Hernán Siles Zuazo stated in a communiqué that Bolivia's 14 member delegation would not be allowed to travel to L.A. for the Games due to an economic crisis. The decision sparked widespread protest among Bolivian sports officials and members of Bolivia's political opposition, who charged the real motive was pressure from the Bolivian Communist Party—at that time a member of the government's ruling coalition—to join the Soviet led boycott. The decision was rescinded once sufficient funds were attained, however, when an article written by Tony Kornheiser of The Washington Post making light of poverty in Bolivia caused indignation from Bolivians believing the article "offended the dignity of our country", President Zuazo declared a boycott of the Games. After The Washington Post issued an editorial apology, President Zuazo reversed the boycott decision, and eleven athletes from Bolivia eventually competed at the Games.

== List of all boycotting countries ==
Listed by chronological order of their withdrawal, not by alphabetical or any geographical order.

- Soviet Union
- Bulgaria
- East Germany
- Mongolia
- Vietnam
- Laos
- Czechoslovakia
- Afghanistan
- Hungary
- Poland
- Cuba
- South Yemen
- Ethiopia
- North Korea
- Angola

Four other countries also boycotted the Games. Two of those countries—Iran and Upper Volta—cited political reasons while the other two—Albania and Libya—provided no explanations whatsoever. None were part of the Soviet-led boycott:

(Listed by chronological order of their withdrawal)

- Albania
- Iran
- Upper Volta
- Libya

== Soviet motive: 'Revenge hypothesis' ==
Western media largely viewed the boycott as a retaliatory move in response to the American-led boycott of the 1980 Games. The 'revenge hypothesis' posits that the move towards retaliation began with a change in leadership of the Soviet Union to a General Secretary predisposed to animosity towards the Americans for the 1980 boycott. During that first boycott the Soviets decried the Americans for carrying out punitive actions which the Soviets claimed—were their positions reversed—they could never in good conscience perform. In carrying out a retaliatory boycott the Soviets would need to avoid accusations of hypocrisy. Thus, the decision was described using language which avoided the term 'boycott' while being buttressed by a disinformation campaign which exaggerated the Los Angeles Games as being too dangerous for socialist athletes. Finally, inflated defection concerns helped seal the decision amongst the few remaining in the Soviet Politburo yet to be convinced of a retaliatory boycott's exigency.

=== Change in leadership ===
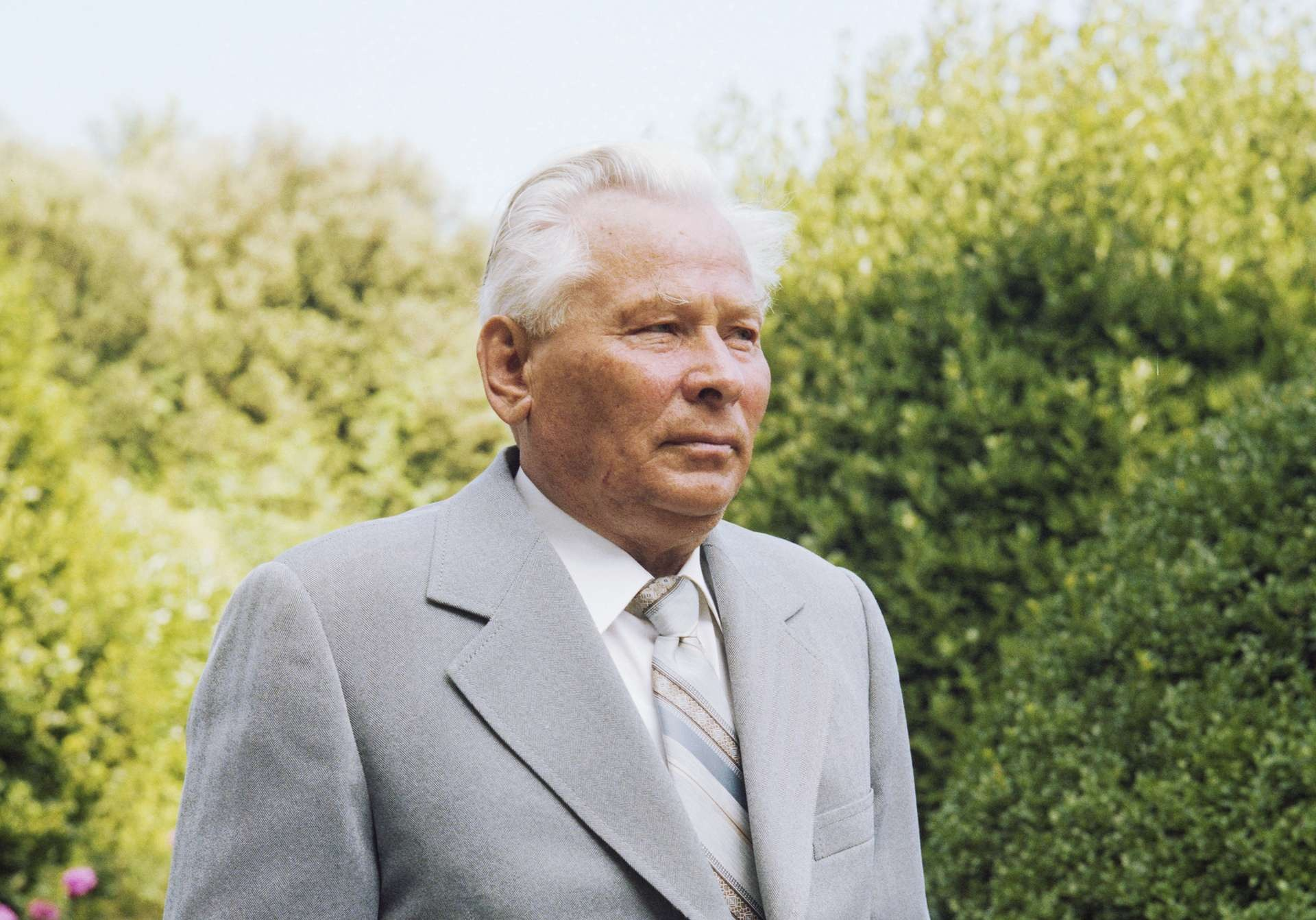
Konstantin Chernenko succeeded Yuri Andropov as Soviet leader on February 9, 1984.

The timeline of when the Soviets ostensibly began their push to boycott suggests their decision‑making turning point was precipitated by a change in leadership. Leonid Brezhnev was General Secretary during the 1980 Moscow Olympics and thus was the leader most affected and publicly embarrassed by the American‑led boycott. Brezhnev died in November 1982, and was replaced by Yuri Andropov. During the 15 months of Andropov's leadership, both in the Soviet Union and in other communist countries, preparations by their individual Olympic committees continued to progress with all-apparent intention of attending the 1984 Games.

With Andropov's death in February 1984, the role of General Secretary was taken over by Konstantin Chernenko, who was a close ally of Brezhnev, and thus more amenable to feelings of antipathy towards the Americans for the 1980 boycott. After Chernenko's succession as leader, a vast change in the Soviet attitude towards the Games could be seen, suggesting that the Soviet decision to boycott was uncertain till at least three months before the Olympics began, and was influenced by the change in leadership from Andropov to Chernenko.

Among those subscribing to the change in leadership as a component of the 'revenge' hypothesis was Peter Ueberroth, who expressed his views in a press conference on May 11, 1984, where he stated that the Soviet Union "withdrew from the Olympics to give America a taste of its own medicine". Ueberroth later indicated that the Soviet-led boycott might have been avoided if organizers of the Summer Games had communicated with Konstantin Chernenko when he took over his country's leadership, saying "In retrospect, we can be criticized for not recognizing that change in leadership, from an Andropov to Chernenko", and that the organizing committee "should have tried to redouble our efforts to make certain there were no problems that could have opened the door to the Soviet-led boycott by 14 nations", adding that "we have tried in every possible way to not have 1980 happen again in 1984, but it did happen".

Paul Ziffren, Chairman of the Board of the LAOOC, shared Ueberroth's view on the effect of Andropov's death:

"When he died and Chernenko came to power, the whole thing changed. Chernenko was always Leonid Brezhnev's man. Brezhnev never forgave the United States for the '80 boycott. And the change in Russian attitude in my mind was a change between Andropov and Chernenko, and once Chernenko came in there, we started getting completely opposite signals."

— Paul Ziffren, Chairman of the Board, LAOOC

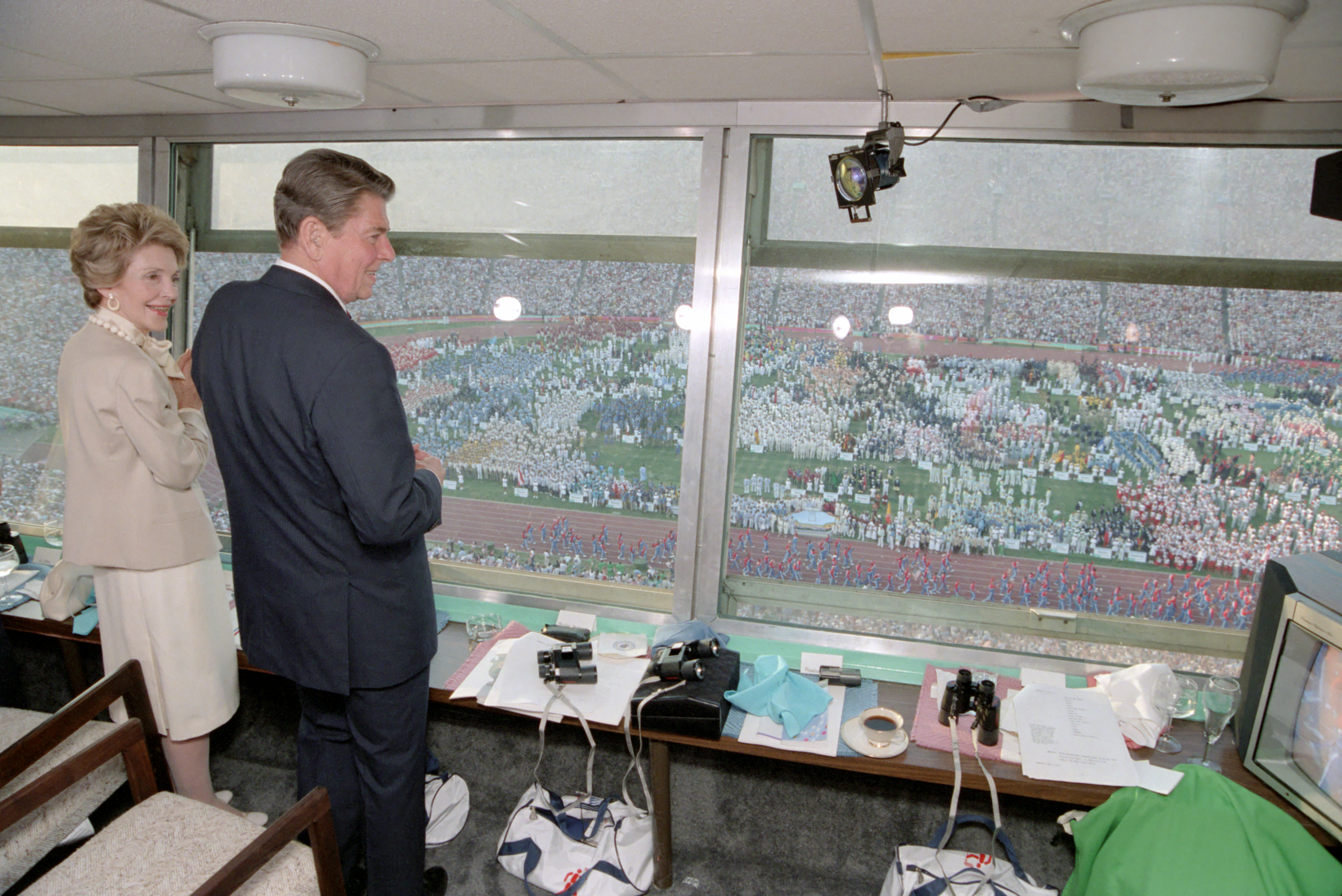
President Reagan and his wife Nancy at the Opening Ceremonies of the Los Angeles Games. Before the boycott was announced, Reagan briefly considered inviting Konstantin Chernenko to be his guest at the Opening Ceremonies, but was eventually dissuaded from doing so by his advisors

President Reagan for his part reached out immediately to the new Soviet leader upon Chernenko becoming General Secretary. On February 10 Reagan composed a letter to Chernenko where he stated that he had "no higher goal than the establishment of a relationship between our two great nations characterized by constructive cooperation". Based primarily on the statements Chernenko made to Vice President Bush at Andropov's funeral, and later, the written response to Reagan from Chernenko on February 23, where Chernenko stated his desire for "a turn toward even and good relations between our two countries", Reagan was inspired on February 22, 1984, to task a team of advisors to consider inviting Chernenko to join Reagan as his guest at the Opening Ceremonies of the L.A. Games. Despite receiving initial support from some circles of advisors in his Administration as well as from German Chancellor Kohl, by April 1984, Reagan's advisors were arguing against sending such an invitation.

=== Disinformation campaign ===
The Bethesda based Advanced International Studies Institute, associated with the University of Miami, said the Soviet impetus to boycott was probably initiated by Chernenko in April 1984. According to the Institute, that was when a concerted Soviet disinformation campaign began, designed to lay the groundwork for their boycott announcement, showing that American streets were "jungles" and that Soviet athletes and spectators would be "the prey of the beasts that the U.S. government allows to run loose in those streets". One example among many, according to the Institute, was the Soviet newspaper Sovetskaya Rossiya, which in April 1984 began publishing seamier representations of the Games' host city:

"Los Angeles was nicknamed murder city long ago. ... The bloody statistics are mainly the work of juvenile gangs. ... These degenerate young people who smoke marijuana and hide a knife down their right trouser leg have two-thirds of all street crimes on their conscience. The outrageous crime rate, for which the city is known, would cast a bloody glow over the Olympic flame."

— Sovetskaya Rossiya, April 15, 1984

Two months after the boycott was announced, officials at the U.S. State Department linked the KGB to a series of hate letters purporting to be from the Ku Klux Klan which were sent to the Olympic organizing committees in Zimbabwe, Sri Lanka, South Korea, Malaysia, Nigeria, Singapore and China, all countries which failed to join the Soviet boycott. State Department spokesman Alan Romberg said the letters "bear all the hallmarks of a disinformation campaign" and noted the thrust of the messages in the letters "dovetails neatly with the Soviet justification for their withdrawal". The threatening letters reportedly used stilted syntax, suggesting they were written by non-native speakers of English. By August, American Attorney General William French Smith revealed that up to 20 nations ultimately received the threatening letters, which Smith described as being "openly racist and disgusting" and that they "threaten violence against Asian and African nations who participate in the Games in Los Angeles". Smith went on to state that "fortunately none of the nations that received these letters succumbed to the attempted intimidation". Smith surmised the likely author of the letters, saying "they were not produced or sent by the Ku Klux Klan ... they were instead manufactured and mailed by another organization devoted to terror: the KGB." The author of the letters had been determined by a State Department interagency workgroup set up during the Reagan Administration to counteract Soviet propaganda. That workgroup, along with an FBI informant inside the KGB, "confirmed that the grammatical mistakes within the letters were not the handiwork of an uneducated Klansman, but of someone who spoke Russian as a first language". (Note: The letters warning of harm to Soviet athletes sent by Ban the Soviets Coalition to the Soviet NOC before the May 8 boycott announcement were distinct from the threatening letters sent to Asian and African NOC's after the boycott announcement. The Coalition letters only ever addressed Soviet athletes, while the letters sent to Asian and African NOC's were notably more ominous and racist in tone, purportedly signed by the Ku Klux Klan using stilted syntax. The U.S. Government believed those letters were written by the KGB as part of a disinformation campaign aimed at justifying the Soviets' boycott rationale and increasing the number of countries withdrawing from the Games.)

=== Defection concerns ===
Historically speaking the Soviets had little reason to be concerned about Olympic defections. From the moment the Soviets began regularly competing at the Olympics in 1952, only one of their athletes—Sergey Nemtsanov—had defected during an Olympic Games, and he later returned voluntarily. Thus the rhetoric coming from Ban the Soviets Coalition on their intent at encouraging athletes to defect instilled what was ultimately an immoderate concern within the Soviet Union's ruling Politburo. That inordinate apprehension was nurtured by an understanding that while Reagan conceded to the more pragmatic Soviet requests covering transportation, press coverage, and housing of Soviet athletes, his concessions lacked a guarantee that there would be no defections by Soviet athletes. This, according to Reagan aide Jack Matlock, was a guarantee "Reagan had no legal or moral right to give". The Politburo was aware of the Reagan Administration's mandate that LAOOC officials involve the U.S. State Department in all asylum requests made by Eastern Bloc athletes, as well as a requirement that the LAOOC notify the FBI. These requirements included the proviso that "under no circumstances should a defector be released to a representative of his country" before pertinent interviews could be made by U.S. authorities. Oleg Yermishkin, the individual tasked by the Politburo to act as their specialist guarding against defections occurring within the Soviet Olympic team during the Games, had his travel visa request denied by the U.S. State Department on the eve of his departure to Los Angeles. That action—viewed by Soviet and American Olympic authorities as misguided—was more evidence for the Politburo that when it came to preventing defections, they and the Reagan Administration were working at cross‑purposes to each other.

Even with the rarity of Olympic athlete defections, the threat of regular Soviet citizens refusing to return to their country was a recurring problem, one which was highlighted on April 30, 1984, when Sergei Kozlov, a Soviet mathematician visiting the United States for the past three months, had what was described as a "nervous breakdown" onboard a mobile lounge at Dulles International Airport just before he was scheduled to board a flight to London. Kozlov told others that he was the victim of a gas attack and was possibly being followed by the KGB, and was changing his mind about returning to Europe. Kozlov eventually spoke with officials from the State Department, who mistook his complaints as a genuine request for asylum. A short time later, the New York University professor who helped sponsor Kozlov's visit to the United States provided State Department officials with more context, describing Kozlov's overall behavior during his stay as "very disturbing", along with other accounts of Kozlov's "ramblings about various things, including pressure from the KGB and his phone being bugged", and his insistence upon "not leaving until all CIA and KGB documents were burned". After learning this additional context, the State Department agreed that Kozlov was "ill" and released him, whereupon he returned to the Soviet Union – but not before the incident garnered national attention as a possible defection, leading the Soviets to make public, diplomatic protests of the State Department's handling of the event.

A telegram from Warren Zimmermann at the American Embassy in Moscow sent to the State Department in Washington theorized that the incident at Dulles Airport had ramifications for the Politburo, by hastening the date of their announcement of a decision which, since at least the beginning of April, had been inexorably moving towards boycotting the Games:

"The Kozlov incident coincided with the final stage of Moscow's consideration of whether or not to attend the Olympics—a decision which would have had to be made no earlier than June 2. (Note: The Soviets were not obligated to make their boycott decision public before June 2, 1984, according to the protocol agreement signed in December 1983 by the Soviet NOC and the LAOOC, where the Soviet NOC committed itself to notification on that date. Conversely, a boycott announcement made after June 2 would have violated the Olympic Charter and risked sanctions by the International Olympic Committee.) The impact may well have been to demonstrate that even a carefully selected, mature individual with a family in the USSR [i.e., Kozlov] could not be relied upon not to become a media event. The potential for similar embarrassment of turning loose an entire team of young, world-class athletes amid the temptations of Los Angeles may thus have taken on an immediacy for Soviet policymakers it did not have before Kozlov's refusal to embark. In the context of the generally tough line on the U.S. currently prevailing in leadership circles here, it would have taken a strong, confident voice to have argued against a boycott. As we have seen too often of late, there is no evidence such a voice exists in the current leadership."

— Warren Zimmermann, May 9, 1984

According to Zimmermann, by the end of April 1984—before the Kozlov incident—"we had word from Soviet contacts in a position to know that training was continuing through last week, and that athletes were planning on being in Los Angeles", suggesting that even with lack of a strong voice in the Politburo arguing for participation "as recently as a week ago, there was [still] strong internal support for participating in the Olympics, and that those favoring staying home had not yet carried the day." Zimmermann surmised that "as to timing, it seems to us most likely that those opposing participation ... wanted the decision announced quickly to cut off further internal lobbying on the issue" and that the Kozlov incident on April 30 offered the perfect pretense for the Politburo to finally make their decision public. The boycott announcement was duly made eight days later. Zimmermann said the eight‑day delay was intended to coincide with a major Soviet holiday, as "knowing how difficult the move would be to explain domestically, the Politburo calculated that an announcement on the eve of Victory Day—when patriotic fervor could be counted upon to be at a yearly high—might quell any doubts."

== Eastern Bloc motives: 'Bloc loyalty' ==
The Soviet boycott announcement of May 8, 1984, was followed by an unofficial, confidential announcement of the Central Committee of the Soviet Communist Party to all 'brother parties' in the socialist countries, wherein the Soviets made clear their expectation that the others join their boycott in solidarity. Following this mandate, a preponderance of Eastern Bloc nations were invited to Moscow on May 11, 1984, for the first of two working meetings regarding the Olympics, the second of which was to be held two weeks later on May 24–25, 1984, in Prague. By May 11, four nations already declared that they would join the Soviets in their boycott. At the Moscow meeting, officials from Bulgaria, Cuba, East Germany, Hungary, Laos, North Korea, Poland, Romania (Note: Although Romania participated in the first Bloc meeting on May 11th in Moscow, they publicly disinvolved themselves from the boycott during the second Bloc meeting on May 24th in Prague.) and Vietnam worked to establish "coordination of a collective approach with reference to the Games" and also "the nature of corresponding declarations for the public." It was established by the individuals meeting there that "anti-Soviet and anti-socialist actions of physical outrage and various forms of pressure of a compromising nature to Soviet and socialist athletes are being prepared", and that "the only possible thing to do is not to go to the Olympic Games." The decision was also notable in that it was meant only for the athletes. Referees and other related officials from the boycotting nations were still expected to participate.

When each of the Soviets' East European satellite countries announced their intention to join the boycott, they individually released press statements which largely mirrored that of the Soviets' stated reasons. As for what other incentive they may have had, a memorandum prepared by the Central Intelligence Agency suggests that at least some of those countries chose to follow along with an unpopular decision in order to foster "bloc loyalty" at a time when there were other, more-important issues warranting a break with the Soviets that they could undertake:

"Other East European states, although unhappy with the Soviet decision, probably view participation in the boycott as a useful way to demonstrate bloc loyalty on an issue of less direct significance to them at a time when they have been resisting Soviet initiatives in more important areas. They also realize that heeding the boycott does not seriously affect their vital interests vis‑à‑vis the West. The Hungarians, for example, told United States Embassy officials after the Soviets rejected Budapest's proposal to send a small team to the games that, in the end, this was not the issue on which to make a stand."

— CIA memorandum, June 26, 1984

=== Hungary ===
U.S. officials said before Hungary announced its decision that if Hungary chose to boycott, the United States would not retaliate by revoking Hungary's most favored nation trade status, a distinction which Hungary held in 1984. A senior State Department official said "the Hungarian decision to join the boycott is understood to be a case of following Kremlin marching orders and will not affect the administration's supporting Hungary's most-favored nation trade treatment."

That question of whether Hungary would join along in boycotting the Games was voted upon by members of the Hungarian Olympic Committee. Pressure was placed on the Olympic committee members by the Hungarian Socialist Workers' Party Central Committee as well as from the Soviet Union itself, which reportedly threatened closing Soviet gas pipelines to Hungary. That caused all but one member of the Hungarian Olympic Committee to vote for non-participation. István Buda, President of the Hungarian Olympic Committee, reportedly resigned following the vote, however, his resignation was not accepted by the Hungarian Socialist Workers' Party Central Committee.

After making their announcement public, the Hungarian Socialist Workers' Party Central Committee established within the Party's agitation and propaganda section an Olympic Operative Workgroup, tasked with monitoring and evaluating the country's radio, television, and press broadcasts which were less rigidly controlled than in other Bloc countries in Eastern and Central Europe. In monitoring these outlets, the Party amplified opinions confirming the boycott decision while concomitantly downplaying opinions criticizing it. The mood of Hungarian athletes was also monitored.

The Workgroup ascertained that:

"...the opinions on MOB's (Hungarian Olympic Committee's) decision were diverse. Most of those people who were politically better prepared did understand the decision, many others–mostly intellectuals and the youth–accepted it with a feeling of frustration, and they disputed the justification. The opinion-makers blamed extremist groups in the USA for the situation, while sometimes mentioning the responsibility of the IOC. Most people feared for the future of the Olympic movement."

According to the Hungarian sports newspaper Nepsport, Hungarian Olympic team members who were particularly recalcitrant in accepting the boycott—approximately 143 athletes—were eventually paid by the Hungarian government varying amounts of cash after unofficially threatening to quit when Hungary announced its boycott. Those athletes reportedly received awards ranging from $100 to $3,000.

=== Poland ===
Polish dependence on the Soviet Union also led to their being pressured to join the Soviets' boycott. As was done in Hungary, in Poland "the ruling political circles made a scapegoat of the [sporting] institution" by having members of the Polish Olympic Committee take a public vote on the question. In that way, those actually behind the decision—the Polish United Workers' Party—were shielded from public opprobrium. A State Department document stated that "the reported agreement of early May that Moscow would allow Warsaw to delay repayment of its trade deficit until the year 1990 apparently assured Polish Prime Minister Jaruzelski's compliance with the boycott".

=== Bulgaria ===
Bulgaria had been the first country to announce it was joining the Soviet boycott. Before their announcement was publicly released, President of the Bulgarian Olympic Committee (BOC), Ivan Slavkov, inadvertently announced that "everything was going well for the L.A. Games", suggesting that the boycott decision was made by Bulgarian Communist Party General Secretary Todor Zhivkov and only communicated to the members of the BOC later that same day.

=== Czechoslovakia ===
On May 30, 1984, an official with the Czechoslovak Olympic Committee informed an American government official that their decision to boycott "was a political decision made by political leaders and that their Olympic Committee had no option but to go along with the decision of the Soviet political establishment".

=== Cuba ===
David Israel, director of Peter Ueberroth's office at the LAOOC who accompanied Ueberroth on his unsuccessful trip to Cuba in June 1984 in an attempt at convincing President Fidel Castro to rescind his boycott decision, said the reason Castro gave for the boycott was that "in the 1960s, during the American embargo, when we stopped having diplomatic relations with the Americans, the only teams they could find to compete with were the Eastern Bloc teams, and out of a sense of loyalty and to show solidarity, he [Castro] was going to boycott."

== Non-boycotting socialist countries ==
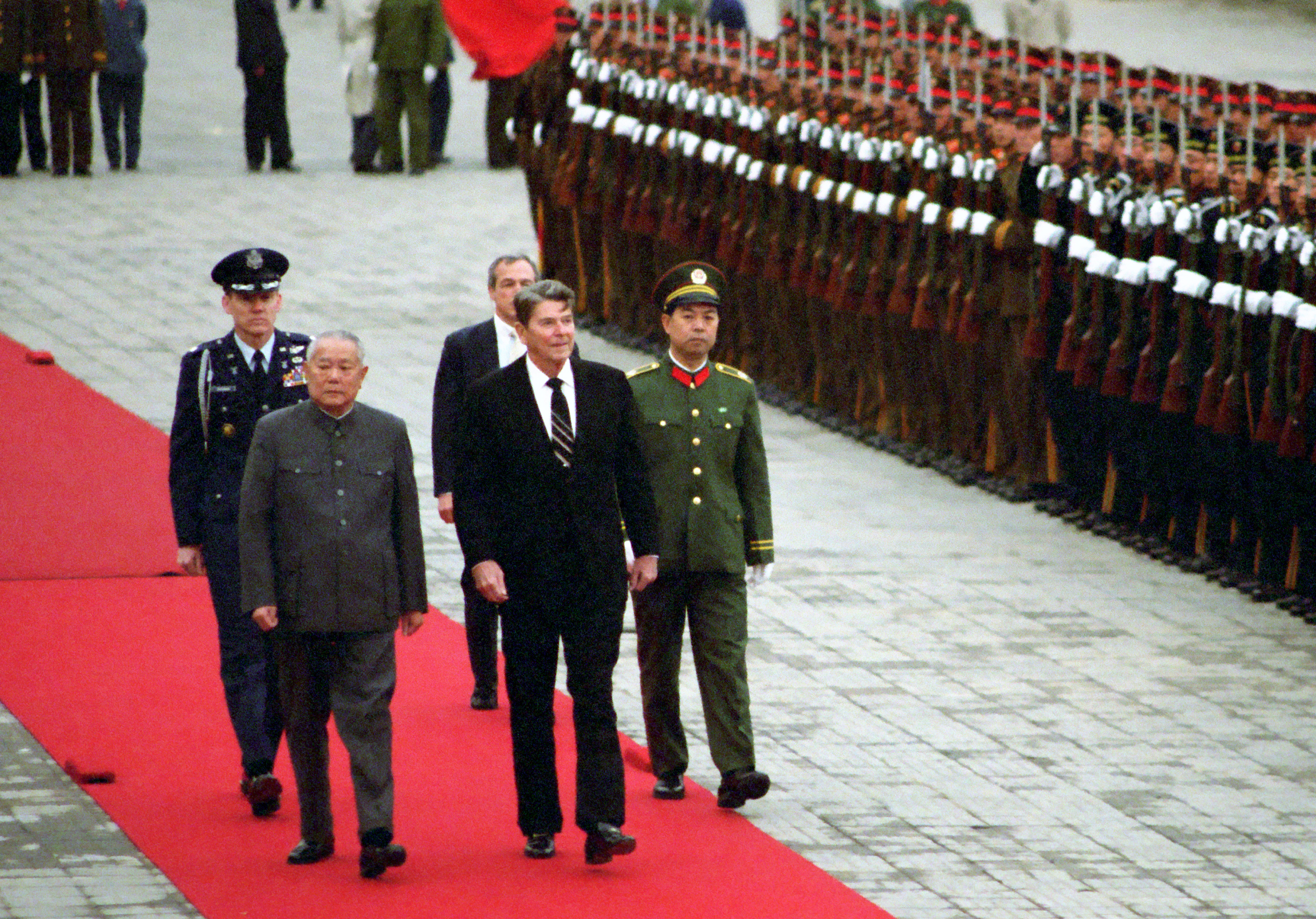
President Reagan's state visit to China three months before the L.A. Games was emblematic of improving relations between the United States and China, reflected in China's decision to make their Summer Olympics debut in 1984 at Los Angeles instead of 1980 in Moscow

Fifteen communist and socialist-leaning countries did not join the Soviet-led boycott and participated in the 1984 Summer Olympics. The Soviet Union was only able to convince two of its eleven socialist African client states to join the boycott, as many of those nations remembered the Soviets' failure to support the African boycott of the Montreal Games in 1976.

- Algeria
- Benin
- Burma
- China chose to make their Summer Olympics debut at the L.A. Games, rather than the Moscow Olympics, despite being a fellow Communist country. China became somewhat hostile towards the Soviet Union in the late 1970s and early 1980s, while at the same time it began experiencing a more cordial relationship with the United States. During the 1980 pair of Winter and Summer Olympic Games, China sent a team to Lake Placid while boycotting Moscow. In support of this newer cordiality, President Reagan made a six‑day state visit to China three months before the start of the L.A. Games, where in Beijing he met with Chinese Premier Zhao Ziyang, and at the Forbidden City, where Reagan was warmly received by paramount leader Deng Xiaoping.
- Republic of the Congo director of the Congolese National Olympic Committee, Suzanne Kakou, stated that despite her and her colleagues being placed under Soviet pressure to join the boycott, there was no reason not to attend, saying "After all, the Soviets did not support the African boycott of the Montreal Games in 1976", so the Congolese NOC "would return that favor".
- Guinea
- Madagascar would go on to join the North Korean-led boycott of the 1988 Summer Olympics four years after the L.A. Games.
- Mali
- Mozambique announced on June 1, 1984, that it would send its Olympic team to Los Angeles amid warming relations with the United States, which recently upgraded its diplomatic links to Mozambique by assigning an official ambassador to Maputo.
- Nicaragua sent a delegation to the L.A. Games to participate in boxing, weightlifting and exhibition baseball, despite that country becoming a Soviet client state after the Sandinistas deposed President Anastasio Somoza Debayle in July 1979. Four years after the L.A. Games, Nicaragua joined the North Korean-led boycott of the 1988 Summer Olympics.
- Romania was the sole European Eastern Bloc country to attend the 1984 Games in Los Angeles. After the Soviets announced their decision to boycott, two successive meetings took place between representatives of the Eastern Bloc countries, including Romania, in order to coordinate their collective response. In Prague on May 24, 1984, at the second of these two meetings, assembled Bloc sports officials were surprised when Romanian Minister for Sport and President of the Romanian NOC, Haralambie Alexa, took the floor to announce Romania's intention of attending the L.A. Games. A diplomatic source later said the announcement ...
  "... was greeted by stunned silence from those attending the meeting, and was followed by a request for a five minute adjournment which ran on for a half hour. Upon resumption of the meeting, the East German representative took the floor and strongly criticized the Romanian decision ... However this was the only speech to do so and no other delegations, including the Soviets, thereafter made reference to the Romanian decision."
  Romania's leader, Nicolae Ceaușescu, had a record of publicly demonstrating opposition to Soviet policies if those stances improved his favorability amongst Romanians. Romanian athletes received a standing ovation at the Opening Ceremonies upon making their Coliseum entrance, and ended up finishing second in the Gold medal count at the Games (behind the United States) and third in the overall medal count (behind the United States and West Germany). In a written correspondence with Ceaușescu following the Games' conclusion, President Reagan offered his personal thanks to Romania for their attendance, saying he "sincerely appreciated Romania's important contribution to the Los Angeles Olympics and the Olympic movement". In 1985 the IOC awarded Ceaușescu and Haralambie Alexa with Olympic Orders, Gold and Silver, respectively. LAOOC President Peter Ueberroth later disclosed that the LAOOC, the IOC, and the Romanian NOC were each responsible for one‑third of the total US$180,000 cost of two round‑trip charter flights carrying Romanian athletes and coaches to Los Angeles on Romania's state‑owned airline TAROM. On the importance of the LAOOC expending a significant amount of money ensuring Romanian attendance, when in other situations—as in the case of El Salvador's funds request—there was no such importance, Charles G. Cale, Associate Vice‑President of the LAOOC, stated "it was pretty important because at that juncture they [the Romanians] were clearly our showpiece as far as the breaking of the boycott", adding "anybody that came that otherwise would have been included in the boycott we felt was positive from the viewpoint of the Games, we felt it would be positive for what the spectators would be seeing and it was positive for the competition."
- Seychelles indicated on June 4, 1984, two days after the June 2 deadline passed, that it would be sending a five-man team to Los Angeles. President of the Seychellois NOC, John Mascarenhas, blamed a "mistake somewhere" as the reason why their acceptance of the invitation was not transmitted by the deadline. The Seychelles, along with Madagascar and Nicaragua, would go on to boycott the 1988 Summer Olympic Games in Seoul.
- Somalia was considered a Soviet client state since at least 1972. By 1978, its relations with the Soviet Union deteriorated after the Soviets supported Ethiopia in the Ethio-Somali War, leading to Somalia joining the U.S.‑led boycott of the Moscow Games in 1980.
- Syria
- Yugoslavia was a founding member of the Non-Aligned Movement. In foreign policy, Yugoslavia acted independently of the Soviet Union and shared friendly relations with both the Soviet Union and the United States. The country showed no interest in joining either of the previous Olympic boycotts in 1976 and 1980, and by the Spring of 1984, had just completed its own successful hosting of the Winter Olympics in Sarajevo. On May 14, 1984, Zdravko Mutin, Administrator of the Yugoslav Olympic Committee, confirmed his country's participation in the Los Angeles Olympics, saying the Americans "have ensured all pre-conditions for participation of our athletes at the Olympics". Yugoslavia finished ninth in the overall medal standings, with a total of 18 Olympic medals won in Los Angeles.

== Alternative events ==
The Soviets organized the Friendship Games, a full-scale multi-sport event held from July to September, 1984, for boycotting countries. The Games were contested in 22 Olympic disciplines (all except association football and synchronized swimming), and in non-Olympic table tennis, tennis, and sambo wrestling. The Soviet Union dominated the medal table, winning 126 gold and 282 total medals. General Secretary Chernenko failed to appear at the closing ceremony of the Friendship Games, held in Moscow. Commentators took the absence as a sign of Chernenko's failing health.

In 2007, Polish President Lech Kaczyński signed into law a qualified sports bill affecting 57 Polish athletes who received medals at the 1984 Friendship Games. With passage of this law, those 57 athletes then became eligible to receive pension benefits equivalent to those already received by Polish athletes who won medals at past Olympic Games which Poland attended. Prior to the law's passage, athletes who were selected to attend the 1984 Games in Los Angeles but were not able to owing to the Polish boycott—who then went on to win medals at the Friendship Games—were ineligible to receive pension benefits.

== Boycott reappraisal ==
In 2014, the Czech Olympic Committee issued a formal apology to those athletes who were denied access to competition at the L.A. Games, saying "Today we can, unclouded by feelings of bad will, assess what went on in our country during the second half of the 20th century, without emotion, but with fairness in mind", adding that "we must find the courage to say out loud what was right, what was wrong and what was downright deceitful".

== See also ==
- De-satellization of Romania
