= Terrence Françoise =

Seychellois politician

- Occupation: Politician
- Known for: politics
- Title: former member of the National Assembly of Seychelles

Terrence Françoise is a former member of the National Assembly of Seychelles. A teacher by profession, he was a member of the National Assembly from 2007 to 2011. In 2016 he was named Chief Executive Officer of the Agency for National Human Resource Development.

Prior to being a member of the National Assembly, Françoise served as a teacher of Mathematics.
