= Pool (surname) =

Family name

Pool is an English and Dutch surname. Notable people with the surname include:

- Albert-Jan Pool (born 1960), Dutch type designer
- Andre Pool, Seychelles politician
- Bettie Freshwater Pool (1860–1928), American writer and teacher from North Carolina
- Brodney Pool (born 1984), American football player
- Bumper Pool (American football) (born 1999), American football player
- Cord Pool, American guitarist for Texas Hippie Coalition
- David de Sola Pool (1885–1970), Jewish spiritual leader from New York; father of Ithiel
- E. Ion Pool (1858–1939), British marathon runner and Olympics critic
- Ithiel de Sola Pool (1917–1984), pioneer in the development of social science; son of David
- Hamp Pool (1915–2000), American football player
- Hugh Pool (born 1964), American guitarist
- Joe R. Pool (1911–1968), American politician from Texas
- John Pool (1826–1884), American politician from North Carolina
- Jonathan Pool (born 1942), American political scientist
- Judith Graham Pool (1919–1975), American scientist, discoverer of cryoprecipitation
- Juriaen Pool (1665–1745), Dutch painter, husband of Rachel Ruysch
- Lafayette G. Pool (1919–1991), American tank-platoon commander in World War II
- Léa Pool (born 1950), Swiss filmmaker, and film instructor in Quebec, Canada
- Malcolm Pool (born 1943), British bass player with The Artwoods and other bands
- Maria Louise Pool (1841–1898), American writer, best known for A Vacation in a Buggy
- Matthijs Pool (1676–1732), Dutch engraver
- Robert Roy Pool (born 1953), American screenwriter
- Rosey E. Pool (1905–1971), Dutch translator, educator, and anthologist
- Solomon Pool (1832–1901), fourth president of the University of North Carolina
- Steve Pool (born 1955), American weather anchor from Washington
- Theodor Pool (1890–1942), Estonian politician and agronomist
- Tim Pool (born 1986), American journalist and political commentator
- Ted Pool (1906–1975), Australian football player
- Victor Pool (born 1992), Dutch DJ
- Walter F. Pool (1850–1883), American politician from North Carolina
- Wim Pool (born 1927), Dutch sprint canoer

== See also ==
- Pool (disambiguation)
