= Sandy Arissol =

Seychellois politician

- Occupation: Politician
- Known for: Politics
- Title: Member of the National Assembly of Seychelles

Sandy Arissol is a member of the National Assembly of Seychelles since 2007, a laboratory technician by profession and part of the Seychelles National Party.
