= Bolot Feray =

1995 Seychelles comedy film

- Directed by: Jean-Claude Matombe
- Written by: Marie-Therese Choppy
- Produced by: Marie-Therese Choppy
- Starring: Alain Belle; Charles DeCommarmond; Jenita Furneau; Antonia Gabriel; Marie Lista
- Cinematography: Vincent Joseph; Humbert Mellie
- Music by: Conrad Damou; Patrick Morel
- Distributed by: SBC
- Release date: 1995 (Seychelles)
- Running time: 125 min.
- Country: Seychelles
- Language: Seychellois Creole

Bolot Feray is a 1995 Seychellois comedy film directed by Jean-Claude Matombe and produced by Marie-Therese Choppy. The film stars Alain Belle in the title role with Charles DeCommarmond, Jenita Furneau, Antonia Gabriel and Marie Lista in supportive roles. It is based on a play and shows traditional Seychellois society.

The film received positive reviews and is considered as one of best Seychellois movies. The play was originally written by Geva René.

== Cast ==
- Alain Belle as Bolot Feray
- Charles DeCommarmond as Uncle Sarl
- Jenita Furneau as Mari
- Antonia Gabriel as Pierreline
- Marie Lista as Poupet
