= Buddy system (disambiguation) =

The buddy system is a procedure in which two people operate together as a single unit so that they are able to monitor and help each other.

Buddy system may also refer to:

- Buddy memory system, a memory allocation algorithm
- The Buddy System (film), a 1984 American film
- "The Buddy System" (The Venture Bros.), a third season episode of The Venture Bros.
- Rhett & Link's Buddy System, a 2016 web television series released on YouTube Red
