= Sylvanne Lemiel =

Seychellois politician (born 1972)

Leader of Government Business in the National Assembly of Seychelles
- Incumbent
- Assumed office 28 October 2025

Personal details
- Born: 3 August 1972 (age 53) Seychelles
- Party: United Seychelles

Sylvanne Lydie Lemiel (née Balette; born 3 August 1972) is a Seychelles politician who has been Leader of Government Business in the National Assembly since October 2025. She is member of the National Assembly.
