= Gervais Henrie =

Seychellois politician

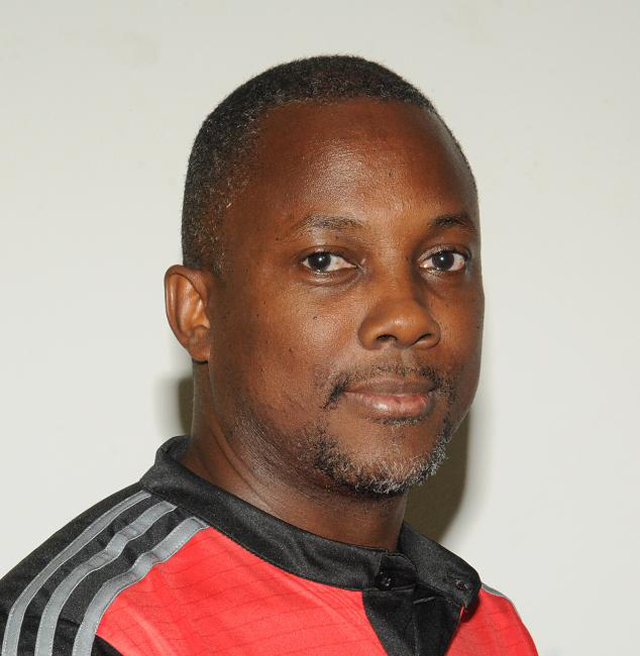
- Henrie in 2014
- Occupation: Politician

Gervais Henrie (born 12 January 1972) is a Seychelles politician and journalist. He is a member of the National Assembly of Seychelles. He is a member of the Seychelles National Party, and was first elected to the Assembly in 2007. Since 2020, he is the Deputy Speaker of the National Assembly.

In September 2016, he was elected to the 6th National Assembly representing the Mont Buxton Constituency. He is a Member of the Media Committee and Committee on Government Assurances. He is the chairman of the Association of Media Practitioners Seychelles.

On 28 October 2020, Henrie was elected Deputy Speaker of the National Assembly.
