= Mont Buxton =

Coordinates: 4°37′S 55°27′E

- District

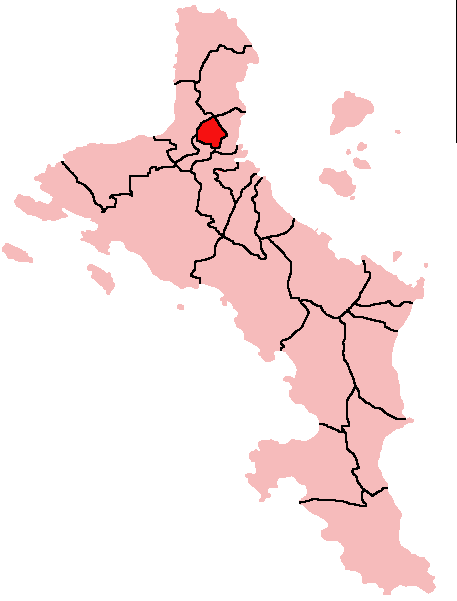
- Location within Mahé Island, Seychelles
- Country: Seychelles

Government
  - District Administrator: Bernadette Rosalie
  - Member of National Assembly: Hon. Gervais Henrie (LDS)

Population (2019 Estimate)
  - Total: 3,169
- Time zone: Seychelles Time

Mont Buxton (French pronunciation: [mɔ̃ bykstɔ̃]) is an administrative district of Seychelles located on the island of Mahé.
