= Egbert Aglae =

Seychellois politician (born 1980)

Deputy Speaker of the National Assembly of Seychelles
- Incumbent
- Assumed office 28 October 2025

Personal details
- Born: 18 May 1980 (age 45) Seychelles
- Party: United Seychelles

Egbert Aglae (born 18 May 1980) is a Seychelles politician who has been Speaker of the National Assembly since October 2025. He is member of the National Assembly for the Port Glaud District. Aglae is chairperson of the communicable diseases/HIV/Aids and SRHR committee.
