= Roger Mancienne =

Seychellois politician

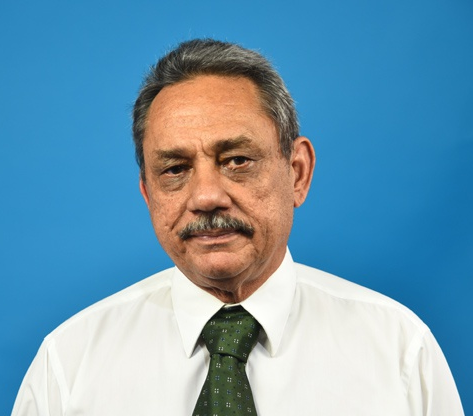
- Mancienne in 2016

Speaker of the National Assembly of Seychelles
- In office 28 October 2020 – 28 October 2025
- Preceded by: Nicholas Prea
- Succeeded by: Azarel Ernesta

Personal details
- Born: 12 December 1947 (age 78) Seychelles

Roger Mancienne (born 12 December 1947) is a politician from Seychelles who served as Speaker of National Assembly of Seychelles from 28 October 2020 to 28 October 2025.

== Personal life ==
Roger Mancienne was born in Mahé, Seychelles, on 12 December 1947. He was the 2015 vice presidential nominee for the Seychelles National Party.
