= Cinema of Seychelles =

The cinema of Seychelles refers to the film industry in the island country of Seychelles, located in the Indian Ocean. While Seychelles is not widely known for its film production, there have been notable films shot in the country and a growing interest in promoting local filmmaking.

== History ==
The history of cinema in Seychelles is relatively short, with the first films being shot in the country in the late 20th century.

== Notable films shot in Seychelles ==
Seychelles has served as a backdrop for various international films. Some notable films shot in Seychelles include:

- Tarzan, the Ape Man (1981)

== Local filmmaking ==
While Seychelles has primarily been a filming location for international productions, there is a growing interest in promoting local filmmaking. The Seychelles Film Commission, established in 2013, aims to support and develop the local film industry by providing resources, funding, and training opportunities for Seychellois filmmakers.

A Love Like This is a 2016 film directed by Chandran Rutnam, produced by the Seychelles Broadcasting Corporation and Rajiv Punater and Rahul Neghra of High Street Riviera Entertainment and The Film Factory with associate producer Colombo Film Academy & Studios.

== See also ==
- Bolot Feray
- Category:Films shot in Seychelles
