= Poole (disambiguation) =

Poole is a town in Dorset, England.

The town gives its name to:

- Poole railway station
- Poole Town F.C., a football club in England
- Poole (UK Parliament constituency)

Poole may also refer to:

== Entertainment ==
- Poole - HAL 9000, a fictional chess game in the movie 2001: A Space Odyssey

== Other places ==
- Poole, Cheshire, a civil parish in England
- Poole, Estonia, village in Elva Parish, Tartu County, Estonia
- Poole County, New South Wales, in Australia
- Poole, Trinidad and Tobago
- Poole, Kentucky, United States
- Poole, Nebraska, United States

== Other ==
- USS Poole (DE-151), a U.S. Navy, World War II destroyer escort ship

== See also ==
- Pool (disambiguation)
