= Azarel Ernesta =

Seychellois politician

Speaker of the National Assembly of Seychelles
- Incumbent
- Assumed office 28 October 2025
- Preceded by: Roger Mancienne

Personal details
- Born: 26 March 1984 (age 42) Seychelles

Azarel Jolinda Ernesta (born 26 March 1984) is a Seychelles politician who has been Speaker of the National Assembly since October 2025. She is the first woman to hold the position.

== Early life and education ==
Azarel Jolinda Ernesta was born on 26 March 1984. She attended Anse aux Pins Primary School and Pointe Larue Secondary School. From 2001 to 2003 she attended the Seychelles Polytechnic before moving to the United Kingdom to undertake a bachelor's degree in business and finance at the Manchester Business School. She later graduated with a Bachelor of Laws from the University of Nicosia in Cyprus.

== Career ==
Ernesta worked in the National Assembly Speaker's Office for seven years, first as the Liaison Officer and then for two years as the Clerk from 2012, the youngest person to hold that role at age 28. After studying law in Cyprus, she returned to Seychelles and joined the Agency for the Prevention of Drug Abuse and Rehab as a Legal Advisor.

Ernesta was elected and sworn in as Speaker of the 8th National Assembly on 28 October 2025, the first woman to hold the position. At age 41, she was also one of youngest individuals elected to the position. She is a member of the United Seychelles Party.

On 2 December, Ernesta took her Affirmation of Adherence before the Southern African Development Community Parliamentary Forum in Durban, South Africa, as the youngest member present. She delivered the Seychelles Country Report, affirming the country's commitment to multilateral cooperation, sustainable development, inclusive participation for youth and women, and the transformation of the SADC PF into a full regional parliament.

Ernesta was a nominee for African Leadership Magazine's 2025 Young African Leader of the Year.

== Personal life ==
Ernesta is married with three children. She is also an artist, working with cross-stitching learned from her grandmother to created works that were shown in exhibition at Kenwyn House in 2014. She started a business venture, Inspiration Tropik, to sell her creations.
