= Francis MacGregor =

Seychellois judge and politician

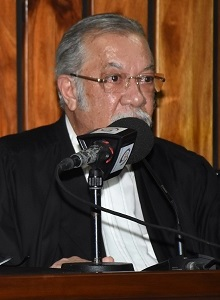
- MacGregor in 2020

Speaker of the National Assembly of Seychelles
- In office 30 July 1993 – 29 May 2007
- Preceded by: Himself
- Succeeded by: Patrick Herminie

Chairman of the People's Assembly of Seychelles
- In office December 1987 – 30 July 1993
- Preceded by: John Mascarenhas
- Succeeded by: Himself

Personal details
- Born: 1950 (age 74–75) Seychelles

Francis Edward MacGregor (born 1950) is a Seychellois judge and politician from Seychelles People's Progressive Front. He served as the Speaker of the National Assembly of Seychelles from 1993 to 2007, as the first speaker after the 1993 multiparty elections.

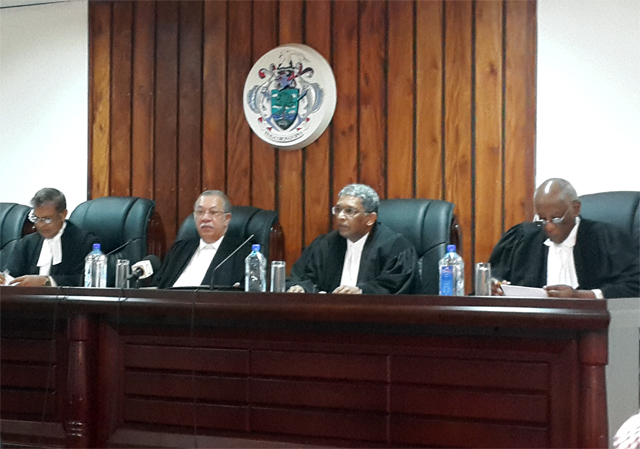
MacGregor (second from left) as President of the Seychelles Court of Appeal

Earlier, he was elected as the Chairman of the People's Assembly after the 1987 elections. MacGregor wrote a book about the legislative history in Seychelles.

He is a lawyer by profession, and current serves as a judge in the judiciary of Seychelles.
