= Wilby Lucas =

- Occupation: Politician

Wilby Lucas is a member of the National Assembly of Seychelles, currently serving as that body's deputy speaker. A lawyer by profession, he is a member of the Seychelles People's Progressive Front, and was first elected to the Assembly in 2007.
