= Sergey Nemtsanov =

Soviet diver

Personal information
- Nationality: Soviet Union
- Born: 23 January 1959 (age 67) Sakhalin, Russian SFSR, USSR

Sport
- Sport: Diving

Sergey Nemtsanov (born 23 January 1959) is a former Soviet diver.

He competed at the 1976 Summer Olympics in Montreal, and announced his defection to Canada. He then had second thoughts and returned to the USSR after a few weeks, and competed again for the USSR in the 1980 Summer Olympics.
