= Andre Pool =

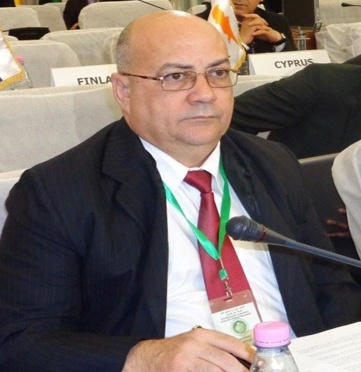
- Occupation: Politician

Andre Pool (born November 23, 1961) was a member of the National Assembly of Seychelles. A teacher by profession, he is a member of the Seychelles People's Progressive Front, and has been elected to the Assembly four times.
