= John Mascarenhas =

Seychellois politician and sports official (died 1997)

His Excellency John Mascarenhas

Chairman of the People's Assembly of Seychelles
- In office 1983 – December 1987
- Preceded by: John Renaud
- Succeeded by: Francis MacGregor

President of the Seychelles National Olympic Committee
- In office 1982–1991

Personal details
- Born: Kenya
- Died: July 1997
- Party: Seychelles Democratic Party (until c. 1970); Seychelles People's United Party (after c. 1970)
- Profession: Politician · sports official

John Philip Mascarenhas (died July 1997) was a Kenyan-born Seychellois politician and sports official. He served as the Chairman of the People's Assembly of Seychelles from 1983 to 1987 and was the President of the Seychelles National Olympic Committee from 1982 to 1991.

== Early life ==
Mascarenhas was born in Kenya, but also lived in Seychelles in the Beau Vallon district. He worked as a part-time journalist.

== Political career ==
Mascarenhas was also active in politics, initially being a member of the Seychelles Democratic Party (SDP) before later leaving for the Seychelles People's United Party (SPUP), becoming a strong independence activist.

In 1970, as a member of the pro-independence SPUP, he was part of a minor scandal against the anti-independence SDP party. When the SDP co-founder, David Joubert, was known to be travelling through Kenya, Mascarenhas called in to the Kenyan newspaper the East African Standard and pretended to be Joubert, declaring that the SDP party now supported independence. This was then carried by a number of newspapers in both countries and the leaders of the SPUP "exploited it mercilessly", although the SDP was later able to get some of the newspapers to issue retractions.

In December 1971, Mascarenhas was expelled from Kenya and thus moved to Seychelles permanently. He was named the publicity secretary of the SPUP party by leader France-Albert René. In January 1972, he published a black power pamphlet titled Seychelles Black Tortoises Epoch highlighting racial prejudice in Seychelles, and it was distributed through Victoria. However, the governor declared it to be "dangerous literature" and ordered he be expelled as a "prohibited immigrant", although Mascarenhas eventually was able to stay.

By 1978, after Seychelles had achieved independence, Mascarenhas was serving on the executive committee of the ruling Seychelles People's Progressive Front (SPPF), a rename of the SPUP. He was also the party's chief welfare officer and its principal secretary for youth and community development by 1980. He later won election to the People's Assembly of Seychelles and was elected the legislature's chairman in 1983. He served as the legislature's chairman for four years until being succeeded by Francis MacGregor in 1987. Afterwards, Mascarenhas served as the Seychelles Principal Secretary for the Environment, from 1988 until at least 1991. In March 1993, he was appointed the high commissioner to the United Kingdom. He remained in the post through 1994 although by 1996 was no longer in the position.

== Sports career and later life ==
Mascarenhas was also active in sports. He was an active figure in promoting sports, particularly basketball, for the youth of Beau Vallon in Seychelles, and the Seychelles Nation noted that his "commitment and dedication really touched and made a big difference in the life of Beau Vallon youth". The Seychelles National Olympic Committee was established in 1979 and Mascarenhas was an official from the start, including serving as the team leader for the Seychelles 1980 Olympic team, the first time the nation had participated at the Olympics.

In 1982, Mascarenhas was named the chairman of the National Sports Council and also became the president of the Seychelles National Olympic Committee. He served as president of the National Olympic Committee from 1982 to 1991 and oversaw the country's participation at two Olympics (1980, 1984).

Mascarenhas died in July 1997. The John Mascarenhas Basketball Academy in Beau Vallon was named in his honour and it annually held local tournaments. His name was engraved at the Seychelles Tourism Pioneer Park "for his notable contributions to the tourism industry", and his name was also engraved on a tile on a concrete pillar at the entrance of the Seychelles Tourism Academy.
