= Charles DeCommarmond =

Seychellois politician (died 2025)

Charles De Commarmond
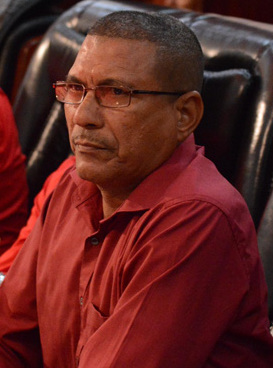

Member of the National Assembly of Seychelles

Personal details
- Occupation: Politician

Charles DeCommarmond was a Seychellois politician and member of the National Assembly of Seychelles. His political party was the Seychelles People's Progressive Front. DeCommarmond was first elected to the National Assembly in 1983 and retired in 2020. He represented the Cascade district. He died in December 2025.
