= National Assembly (Seychelles) =

Legislature of the Seychelles

National Assembly Seychellois Creole: Lasanble Nasyonal French: Assemblée nationale
- 8th National Assembly
- Logo of the National Assembly of Seychelles.

Type
- Type: Unicameral

History
- Founded: 30 July 1993
- Preceded by: People's Assembly of Seychelles

Leadership
- Speaker: Azarel Ernesta, US since 28 October 2025
- Deputy Speaker: Egbert Aglae, US since 28 October 2025
- Leader of Government Business: Sylvanne Lemiel, US since 28 October 2025
- Leader of the Opposition: Bernard Georges, LDS since 28 October 2025

Structure
- Seats: 34
- Political groups: Government (19): US (19); Opposition (15): LDS (15)
- Length of term: 5 years

Elections
- Voting system: Parallel voting
- First election: 20–23 July 1993
- Last election: 25–27 September 2025
- Next election: Not before 30 September 2030

Motto
- United in diversity Seychellois Creole: Linite dans diversite

Meeting place
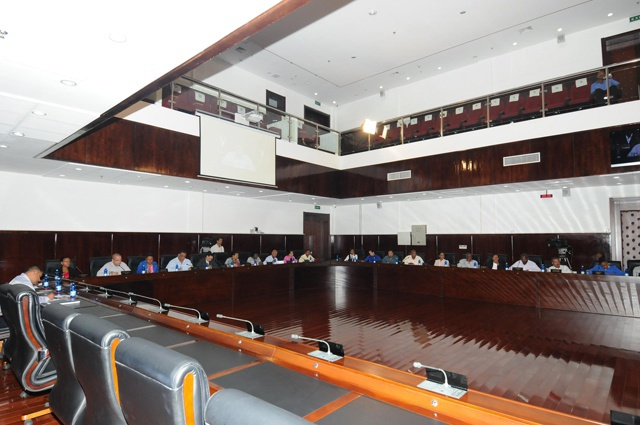
- National Assembly Building, Victoria

Website
- nationalassembly.sc

Constitution
- Constitution of Seychelles

The unicameral National Assembly (French: Assemblée nationale; Creole: Lasanble Nasyonal) is the Seychelles's legislative body.

The National Assembly in its current constellation formed following elections held on 25–27 September 2025, with a total of 34 members. The current Speaker of the National Assembly is Azarel Ernesta, in office since 28 October 2025.

== Background ==
National Assembly building

The current National Assembly was preceded by the Legislative Council of Seychelles from 1962 to 1970, the Legislative Assembly from 1970 to 1974, the House of Assembly from 1975 to 1976, the National Assembly 1976 to 1977 and the People's Assembly from 1979 to 1993.

26 members are elected in single member constituencies using the simple majority (or First-past-the-post) system. The remaining up to nine members are elected through a system of proportional representation. Members serve five-year terms.

The working language of the National Assembly is Seychellois Creole. With permission from the speaker, members may address the assembly in English or French. Visitors may address the assembly in other languages with the speaker's permission.

== List of speakers ==
Position	Name	Took office	Left office	Notes
Legislative Council of Seychelles	Julian Asquith, 2nd Earl of Oxford and Asquith	January 1962	February 1967	Also colonial governors
Legislative Council of Seychelles	Hugh Norman-Walker	February 1967	January 1969	Also colonial governors
Legislative Council of Seychelles	Bruce Greatbatch	January 1969	November 1970	Also colonial governors
Speaker of the Legislative Assembly	Michel Lousteau-Lalanne	1970	1974	
Speaker of the House of Assembly	Michel Lousteau-Lalanne	1975	1976	
Speaker of the National Assembly	Michel Lousteau-Lalanne	1976	June 1977	
In abeyance		June 1977	1979	
Chairman of the People's Assembly	David Thomas	1979	1979	
Chairman of the People's Assembly	John Renaud	1979	1983	
Chairman of the People's Assembly	John Mascarenhas	1983	December 1987	
Chairman of the People's Assembly	Francis MacGregor	December 1987	1993	

Speakers and deputy speakers of the National Assembly of Seychelles since the 1993 multiparty elections:

Legislature	Speaker	Deputy	Entered office	Left office
First National Assembly	Francis MacGregor	Shelton Jolicoeur	30 July 1993	1998
Second National Assembly	Francis MacGregor	Shelton Jolicoeur	30 March 1998	2002
Third National Assembly	Francis MacGregor	Shelton Jolicoeur; Dick Esparon	17 December 2002	2007
Fourth National Assembly	Patrick Herminie	Wilby Lucas	29 May 2007	2011
Fifth National Assembly	Patrick Herminie	Andre Pool	2011	September 2016
Sixth National Assembly	Patrick Pillay	Nicholas Prea	27 September 2016	29 January 2018
Sixth National Assembly	Nicholas Prea	Ahmed Afif	6 March 2018	28 October 2020
Seventh National Assembly	Roger Mancienne	Gervais Henrie	28 October 2020	28 October 2025
Eighth National Assembly	Azarel Ernesta	Egbert Aglae	28 October 2025	present

== Parliamentary leaders ==
The members serving as Leader of Government Business since 1993:

Legislature	Member	Party	Entered office	Left office
First National Assembly	Danny Faure	Seychelles People's Progressive Front	30 July 1993	1998
Second National Assembly	Patrick Herminie	Seychelles People's Progressive Front	30 March 1998	2002
Third National Assembly	Patrick Herminie	Seychelles People's Progressive Front	17 December 2002	2007
Fourth National Assembly	Marie-Louise Potter	Seychelles People's Progressive Front	29 May 2007	2011
Fifth National Assembly	Marie-Louise Potter	People's Party	2011	March 2012
Fifth National Assembly	Marie-Antoinette Rose	People's Party	March 2012	May 2016
Fifth National Assembly	Charles DeCommarmond	People's Party	7 June 2016	September 2016
Sixth National Assembly	Charles DeCommarmond	United Seychelles	27 September 2016	28 October 2020
Seventh National Assembly	Bernard Georges	Linyon Demokratik Seselwa	28 October 2020	28 October 2025
Eight National Assembly	Sylvanne Lemiel	United Seychelles	28 October 2025	present

Additionally, opposition has been organized with an elected Leader of the Opposition since 1993.

== 2025 National Assembly elections ==
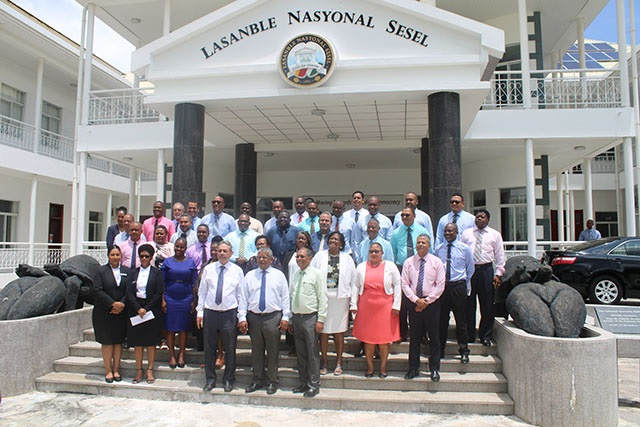
The members of the seventh National Assembly (2020)

Party	Votes	%	Seats			
Party	Votes	%	FPTP	PR	Total	+/−
United Seychelles	30,880	49.14	15	4	19	+9
Linyon Demokratik Seselwa	28,159	44.81	11	4	15	−10
Seychelles United Movement	1,316	2.09	0	0	0	New
Lalyans Nouvo Sesel	852	1.36	0	0	0	New
Mouvman Lavwa Seselwa	700	1.11	0	0	0	New
Seychelles People's National Movement	326	0.52	0	0	0	New
Laliberté	190	0.30	0	0	0	New
Independents	414	0.66	0	0	0	0
Total	62,837	100.00	26	8	34	−1
Valid votes	62,837	96.99				
Invalid/blank votes	1,950	3.01				
Total votes	64,787	100.00				
Registered voters/turnout	77,045	84.09				
Source: ECS

== See also ==
- History of Seychelles
- Legislative branch
- List of national legislatures
