= Connection pool =

Cache of database connections

In software engineering, a connection pool is a cache of reusable database connections managed by the client or middleware. It reduces the overhead of opening and closing connections, improving performance and scalability in database applications.

SQL databases typically use stateful, binary protocols that maintain session-specific information, such as transaction states and prepared statements, necessitating optimized connection pooling to minimize the overhead of repeatedly establishing connections. Conversely, many mainstream NoSQL databases, like Azure Cosmos DB and Amazon DynamoDB, utilize stateless, HTTP-based protocols that handle each request independently. This architecture often reduces the need for traditional connection pooling, though reusing established connections can still offer performance benefits in high-throughput scenarios by avoiding the overhead of connection creation.

== Connection pooling efficiency ==
Following factors can affect connection pooling efficiency:

=== Connection limits and overprovisioning ===
In database environments, connection limits are typically determined by service tiers or resource configurations. Azure SQL Database defines connection limits based on the selected tier, while Azure SQL Managed Instance enforces limits based on allocated resources, such as CPU, memory, or vCores. When connection pool configurations exceed these limits, issues such as rejected connections, throttling, or degraded performance can occur.

Depending on how database limits are applied, overprovisioned connection pools can create significant resource contention as the server struggles to manage excessive simultaneous connections. Idle connections may encounter issues due to network conditions, such as NAT timeouts or dropped connections, or database state changes, such as session invalidation or transaction timeouts, potentially triggering reconnection processes that introduce additional overhead and performance penalties. Over-provisioned pools can overwhelm server resources, causing increased latency and degraded system performance. To optimize database connectivity, connection pool configurations should be carefully aligned with the database's capacity and the application's specific workload, ensuring efficient connection reuse without overburdening the database server and maintaining a balance between connection availability and resource utilization.

=== Authentication methods ===
Token-based authentication mechanisms, such as Azure AD authentication, may affect connection pooling due to token expiration. Expired tokens can invalidate connections within the pool, interrupting reuse. This behavior is observed in both cloud-based and on-premises database systems that implement modern authentication protocols.

=== Network latency and endpoints ===
The efficiency of connection pooling can be influenced by network latency and endpoint configurations. Public endpoints, commonly used in cloud-hosted databases, often introduce higher latency compared to private or direct connections. In environments with dynamic IP addressing, such as those involving cloud-native applications, disruptions in connection reuse may occur if firewall rules are not synchronized with changing IP addresses.

=== Encryption requirements ===
Databases that enforce TLS encryption, including those deployed in cloud and on-premises environments, require alignment between encryption settings and connection configurations. For example, the absence of encryption parameters in connection strings can lead to connection failures, rendering the pool ineffective.

=== DNS resolution ===
Private endpoints and custom DNS configurations can create challenges for connection pooling. Inconsistent or misconfigured DNS settings may delay or block connection establishment, affecting the performance and efficiency of connection reuse. This is particularly notable in environments with hybrid or private cloud setups.

== In Amazon Web Services ==
In modern cloud architectures like AWS, effective connection pooling management is critical for optimizing performance, scalability, and resource utilization. Improper handling of connections can lead to bottlenecks and operational inefficiencies. Connection pooling behavior varies across compute platforms:

1. Function-as-a-Service (FaaS): AWS Lambda creates new database connections per invocation, which can cause connection storms under high concurrency if unmanaged. Solutions like Amazon RDS Proxy help pool connections efficiently.
2. Containerized Environments: Amazon Elastic Container Service (ECS) containers maintain open database connections for their lifecycle. Without connection pooling mechanisms (e.g., HikariCP, pgbouncer), idle or excessive connections can strain database resources.
3. Virtual Machine-Based Environments: AWS EC2 instances scale connection demand with the number of instances. Manual or automated tuning of connection pool parameters is essential to prevent exceeding database limits.

Modern cloud databases offer advanced solutions to mitigate connection pooling challenges:

- AWS Aurora Serverless v2: Dynamically scales connections and abstracts the need for manual connection pooling, ideal for unpredictable workloads.
- AWS DynamoDB: A stateless NoSQL database, eliminates traditional connection pooling, making it inherently scalable and serverless-friendly.

This ecosystem of tools and services allows architects to design scalable and efficient applications while minimizing connection management overhead.

== In Microsoft Azure ==
Azure SQL Database, Azure SQL Managed Instance, and SQL Server on virtual machines rely on client-side connection pooling implemented by libraries such as ADO.NET and JDBC. The database engine does not manage pooling, as it is entirely handled at the client level. Environmental factors, including service-tier limits in Azure SQL Database and resource constraints in Managed Instance, may indirectly affect pooling performance.

=== Azure CosmosDB ===
In Azure Cosmos DB, connection pooling is managed at the SDK level rather than by the database service itself. SDKs such as those for .NET, Java, and Python implement connection pooling to reuse HTTP connections to the database endpoint, optimizing resource usage and performance. This functionality applies to all Cosmos DB account types, including provisioned throughput and serverless models. The stateless, HTTP-based architecture of Cosmos DB facilitates scalable and concurrent operations without the limitations typically associated with traditional connection pooling mechanisms.

== See also ==
- Object pool pattern
