= Mktemp =

Unix command

mktemp
- Developers: Todd Miller, Jim Meyering
- Initial release: 1997; 29 years ago
- Written in: C
- Operating system: Unix and Unix-like
- Platform: Cross-platform
- Type: Command

mktemp is a command available in many Unix-like operating systems that creates a temporary file or directory. Originally released in 1997 as part of OpenBSD 2.1, a separate implementation exists as a part of GNU Coreutils.

There used to be a similar named C library function, which is now deprecated for being unsafe, and has safer alternatives.

== See also ==
- Filesystem Hierarchy Standard
- Temporary folder
- TMPDIR
- Unix filesystem
