= Wom =

Wom or WOM may refer to:

== Businesses and organizations ==
- World of Motion, a former EPCOT Center attraction
- AT&T High Seas Service, callsign WOM
- W. O. Mitchell Elementary School, the abbreviation of a school in Ottawa
- WOM magazin, a German music magazine
- WOM, a Chilean telecommunications company

== Places ==
- Wom Brook, a brook in South Staffordshire, England
- WOM, station code for Wombwell railway station
- Cape Wom, Papua New Guinea

== Other ==
- Wom language (disambiguation)
- Write-only memory (disambiguation), a term in computing
- Wake-on-Modem, turn on device from sleeping
- Barry Wom, member of fictitious band The Rutles
- WOM marketing
