= TMPDIR =

UNIX environment variable

TMPDIR is the canonical environment variable in Unix and POSIX that should be used to specify a temporary directory for scratch space. Most Unix programs will honor this setting and use its value to denote the scratch area for temporary files instead of the common default of /tmp or /var/tmp.

Other forms sometimes accepted are TEMP, TEMPDIR and TMP, but these alternatives are used more commonly by non-POSIX operating systems or non-conformant programs.

TMPDIR is specified in various Unix and similar standards, e.g. per the Single UNIX Specification.

== See also ==
- Filesystem Hierarchy Standard
- mktemp
- Unix filesystem
