= Devfsd =

devfsd
- Developer(s): Richard Gooch
- Operating system: Linux kernel
- Type: daemon
- License: GNU General Public License (GPL)
- Website: www.safe-mbox.com/~rgooch/linux/

devfsd is a device manager for the Linux kernel. Primarily, it creates device nodes in the /dev directory when kernel drivers make the underlying hardware accessible. The nodes exist in a virtual device file system named devfs. In systems that support many different types of hardware, each of which has its own device nodes, this is more convenient than creating all possible device nodes beforehand and in a real filesystem.

While devfs was a step forward, it had several disadvantages of its own. Since version 2.5 of the Linux kernel, devfs has been succeeded by udev and devtmpfs.

== See also ==
- sysfs
