= FINO =

Humorous scheduling algorithm "First In, Nothing Out"

In computer science, FINO is a humorous scheduling algorithm. It is an acronym for first in, never out as opposed to traditional first in, first out (FIFO) and last in, first out (LIFO) algorithms. A similar acronym is "FISH", for first in, still here.

FINO works by withholding all scheduled tasks permanently. No matter how many tasks are scheduled at any time, no task ever actually takes place.

A stateful FINO queue can be used to implement a memory leak.

The first mention of FINO appears in the Signetics 25120 write-only memory joke datasheet.

== See also ==
- Bit bucket
- Black hole (networking)
- /dev/null
- Write-only memory
