= EWOM =

EWOM may refer to:

- Erasable Write-Only memory
- eWOM, Electronic word-of-mouth marketing
- Elemental: War of Magic, a fantasy strategy game
