= SubOS =

In computing, a SubOS may mean several related concepts:

- A process-specific protection mechanism allowing potentially dangerous applications to run in a restricted environment. It worked by setting a sub-user id which was user id of the owner of the file rather than the person running the file.
- A substitute-operating system, which simulated a full operating system. These were mainly developed by the GameMaker community.
- An interface (graphical or terminal based) that provides additional functions or command for a specific audience target.

It can also make processes easier and add details to the main operating system.

== See also ==
- Virtual machine
- Sandbox (computer security)
