= Write-only memory =

Write-only memory may refer to:

- Write-only memory (joke), a jocular term for a useless device
- Write-only memory (engineering), memory that cannot be read by the processor writing to it

== See also ==
- Write-only (disambiguation)
