= Kernfs =

kernfs may refer to:

- kernfs (BSD), a pseudo file system in BSD-based operating systems
- kernfs (Linux), a set of functions in the Linux kernel that aid in creation of pseudo file systems
