= Subgraph =

The term subgraph can refer to:

- The security-focused Linux-based Subgraph operating system, see Subgraph (operating system)
- Subgraph of a function, see Hypograph (mathematics)
- In graph theory, see Glossary of graph theory#subgraph
