= Kernfs (Linux) =

Set of functions in the Linux kernel

In the Linux kernel, kernfs is a set of functions that contain the functionality required for creating the pseudo file systems used internally by various kernel subsystems so that they may use virtual files. For example, sysfs provides a set of virtual files by exporting information about hardware devices and associated device drivers from the kernel's device model to user space.

The creation of kernfs resulted from splitting off part of the internal logic used by sysfs. The associated patchset, with Tejun Heo as its main author, was merged into the Linux kernel mainline in kernel version 3.14, which was released on March 30, 2014. Kernfs took the independent and reusable functionality of sysfs so other kernel subsystems can implement their own pseudo file systems more easily and consistently.

One of the primary users of kernfs is the pseudo file system used internally by cgroups, whose redesign continued into version 3.15 of the Linux kernel.

== See also ==
- procfs – a pseudo file system in Unix-like operating systems that presents information about processes (and about some other system information)
- tmpfs – a pseudo file system for temporary file storage on many Unix-like operating systems
