= /dev/full =

Device file in Unix-like operating systems

In Linux, FreeBSD, and NetBSD, /dev/full, or the always-full device, is a special file that always returns the error code ENOSPC (meaning "No space left on device") on writing, and provides any number of zero bytes to a process that reads from it (similar to /dev/zero). This device is usually used when testing the behavior of a program when it encounters a "disk full" error.

$ echo "Hello, World" > /dev/full
bash: echo: write error: No space left on device

== History ==
Support for the always-full device in Linux is documented as early as 2007. Native support was added to FreeBSD in the 11.0 release in 2016, which had previously supported it through an optional module called lindev. The full device appeared in NetBSD 8.

== Relationship to other special files ==
| Device | Read behavior | Write behavior | Use case |
|---|---|---|---|
| /dev/full | Returns zeros | Returns ENOSPC | Testing disk full errors |
| /dev/zero | Returns zeros | Discards data | Memory initialization |
| /dev/null | Returns EOF | Discards data | Suppressing output |

== See also ==
- /dev
- /dev/null
- /dev/zero
- Fault injection
- /dev/mordor in 9front
