= H. Peter Anvin =

Swedish-American computer programmer (born 1972)

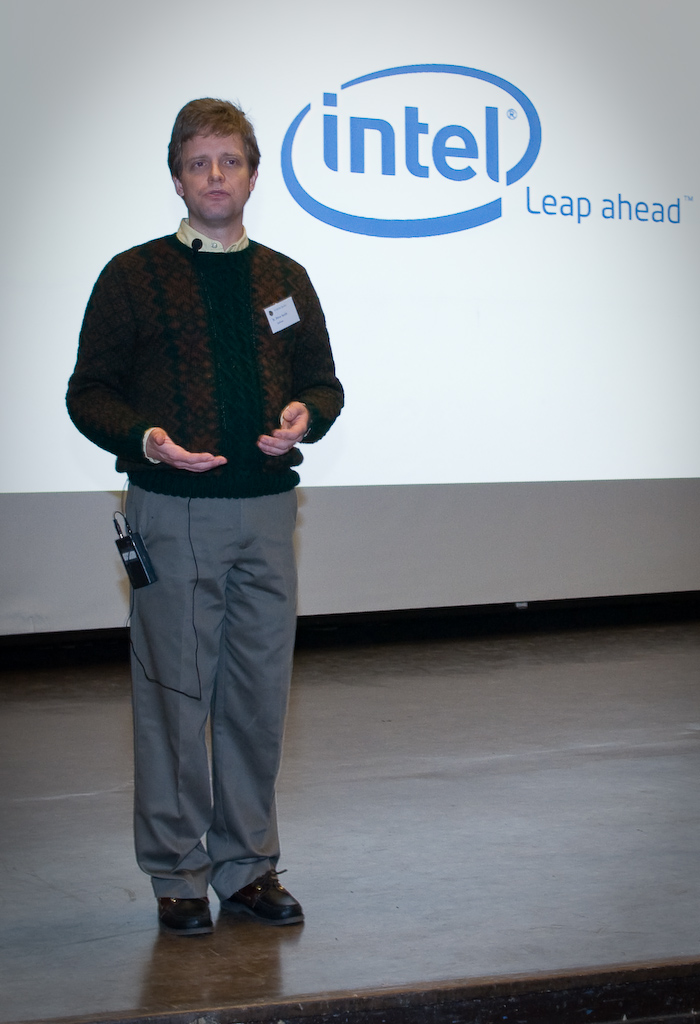
- Anvin speaking at FOSDEM in 2009
- Born: Hans Peter Anvin; 12 January 1972 (age 54); Västerås, Sweden
- Occupation: Software engineer
- Employer: Intel Corporation
- Known for: SYSLINUX, Linux kernel
- Website: www.zytor.com/~hpa

Hans Peter Anvin (born 12 January 1972), also known as hpa, is a Swedish-American computer programmer who has contributed to free and open-source software projects. Anvin is the originator of SYSLINUX, Linux Assigned Names and Numbers Authority (LANANA), and various Linux kernel features.

== History ==
Peter Anvin grew up in Västerås, Sweden. He moved to the United States in 1988, as a teenager, when his father moved to Chicago.

Anvin was previously maintainer of the linux.* Usenet newsgroup hierarchy and the Linux kernel archives at kernel.org, wrote the original Swap Space How-to, and the "Linux/I386 Boot Protocol" (file: linux/Documentation/i386/boot.txt)

Peter Anvin graduated in 1994 from Northwestern University, where he also was president of the Northwestern Amateur Radio Society (W9BGX); his amateur radio call sign is AD6QZ (formerly N9ITP). According to his personal web site, he is a believer in the Baháʼí Faith.

In addition to his regular employment at Intel's Open Source Technology Center, Anvin was a long-time co-maintainer of the unified x86/x86-64 Linux kernel tree, chief maintainer of the Netwide Assembler (NASM) and SYSLINUX projects. Previous employers include Transmeta, where he performed as architect and technical director; Orion Multisystems, working on CPU architecture and code morphing software; and rPath.

== Linux kernel works ==
- UNIX98 ptys
- CPUID driver
- The Linux kernel automounter
- zisofs
- RAID 6 support
- x32 ABI
- klibc – a minimalistic subset of the standard C library
