= Bit bucket =

Lost data in computing

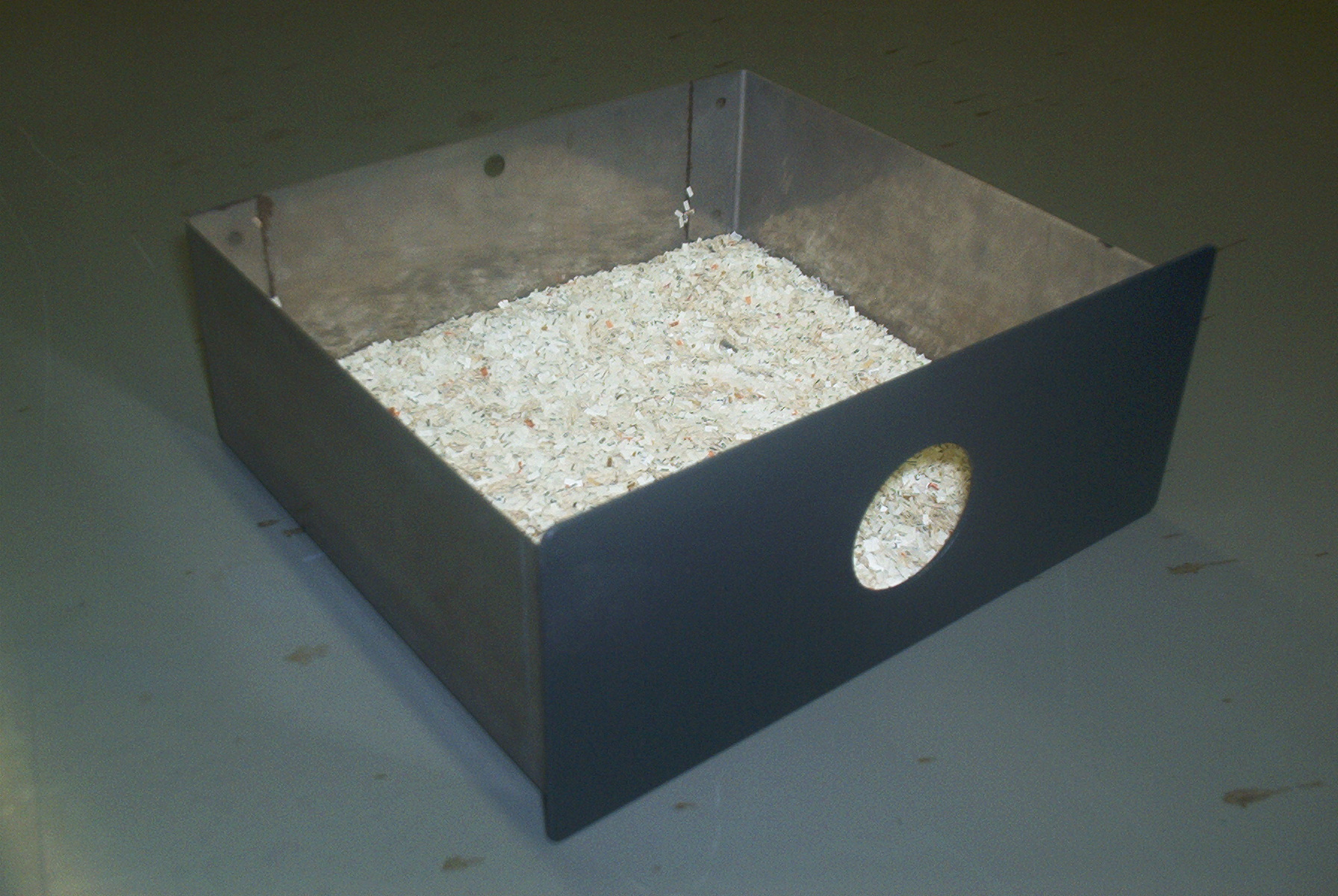
The chad receiver (or "bit bucket") from a UNIVAC key punch

In computing jargon, the bit bucket (or byte bucket) is the notional, metaphorical destination of any computerized data which does not go to a useful destination, for any reason. For example, the bit bucket may refer to the destination of data lost in transmission, or data lost in a computer crash, or simply data which is intentionally discarded.

The errant byte, having failed the parity test, is unceremoniously dumped into the bit bucket, the computer's wastepaper basket.

— Erik Sandberg-Diment, New York Times, 1985.

The term is also used metaphorically to refer to any waste in pursuit of computer science:

Millions of dollars in time and research data gone into the bit-bucket?

— W. Paul Blase, The Washington Post, 1990.

== History ==
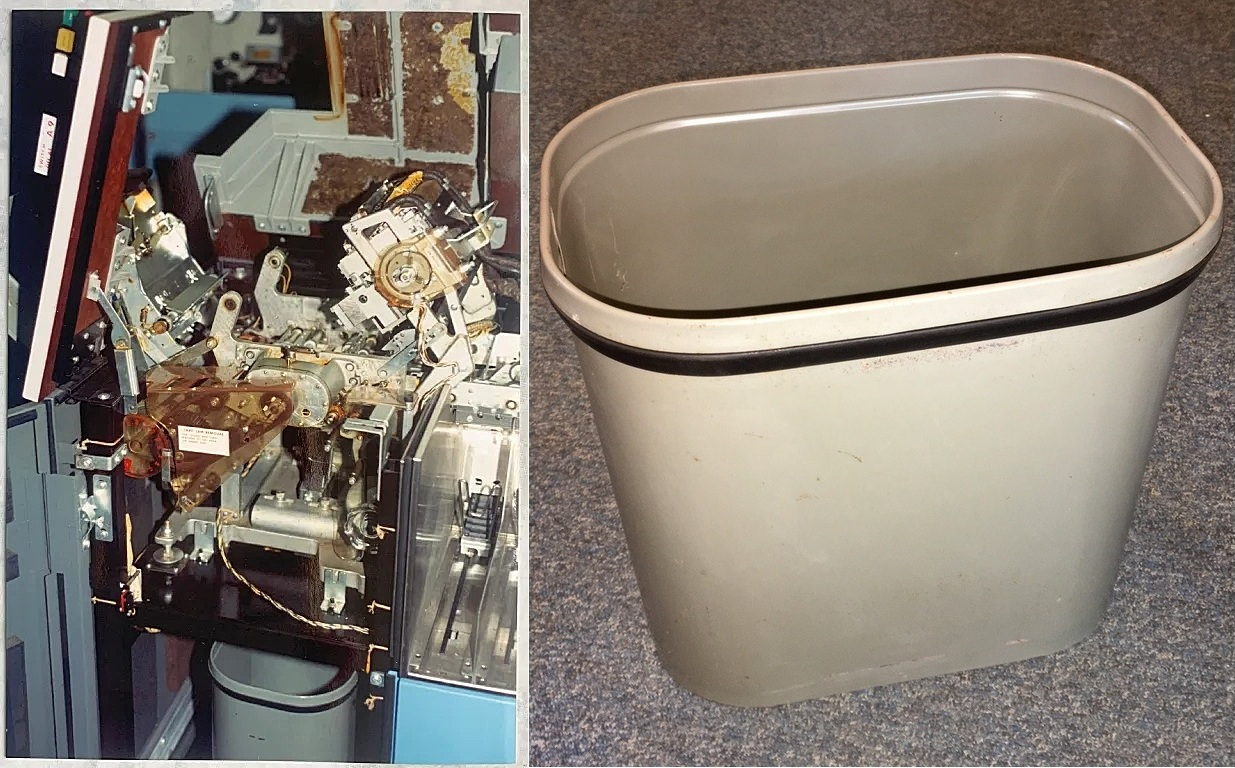
A "bit bucket" as used in the IBM 2540 card reader/punch. Shown on the left in position under the 2540 punch station.

Originally, the bit bucket was the container on teletype machines or IBM key punch machines into which chad from the paper tape punch or card punch was deposited; the formal name is "chad box" or (at IBM) "chip box". The term was then generalized into any place where useless bits go, a useful computing concept known as the null device. The term bit bucket is also used in discussions of bit shift operations.

The bit bucket is related to the first in never out buffer and write-only memory, in a joke datasheet issued by Signetics in 1972.

In a 1988 April Fool's article in Compute! magazine, Atari BASIC author Bill Wilkinson presented a POKE that implemented what he called a "WORN" (Write Once, Read Never) device, "a close relative of the WORM".

In programming languages the term is used to denote a bitstream which does not consume any computer resources, such as CPU or memory, by discarding any data "written" to it. In .NET Framework-based languages, it is the System.IO.Stream.Null.

== See also ==
- Black hole (networking)
- Waste container metaphors
