= Write-only =

Write-only or write only may refer to:

- A file access permission type
- In programming languages, a property of a class, which has only mutator methods
- Write-only publishing, a derogatory term for predatory open-access publishing
- Write-only memory (disambiguation)
- A write-only transaction, also known as a blind write
