= Lmctfy =

OS-level virtualisation

lmctfy
- Developer: Google Inc
- Initial release: 13 October 2013; 12 years ago
- Final release: 0.4.5 / March 28, 2014; 11 years ago
- Written in: C++
- Operating system: Linux
- License: Apache License, Version 2.0
- Website: github.com/google/lmctfy

lmctfy ("Let Me Contain That For You", pronounced "l-m-c-t-fi") is an implementation of an operating system-level virtualization, which is based on the Linux kernel's cgroups functionality.

It provides similar functionality to other container-related Linux tools such as Docker and LXC. Lmctfy is the release of Google's container tools and is free and open-source software subject to the terms of the Apache License version 2.0.

The maintainers in May 2015 stated their effort to merge their concepts, and abstractions into Docker's underlying library libcontainer and thus stopped active development of lmctfy. Docker, Inc. further integrated libcontainer into their container format and runtime runc and subsequently donated it to the Open Container Initiative.
