= Configfs =

Virtual file system in the Linux kernel

Configfs is a RAM-based virtual file system provided by the 2.6 Linux kernel.

== Details ==
Configfs appears similar to sysfs but they are in fact different and complementary. Configfs is for creating, managing and destroying kernel objects from user-space, and sysfs for viewing and manipulating objects from user-space which are created and destroyed by kernel space. It is typically mounted at /sys/kernel/config (or more rarely at /config).

== See also ==
- tmpfs
- sysctl – an interface for examining and dynamically changing parameters in the BSD and Linux operating systems
