= Scratch tape =

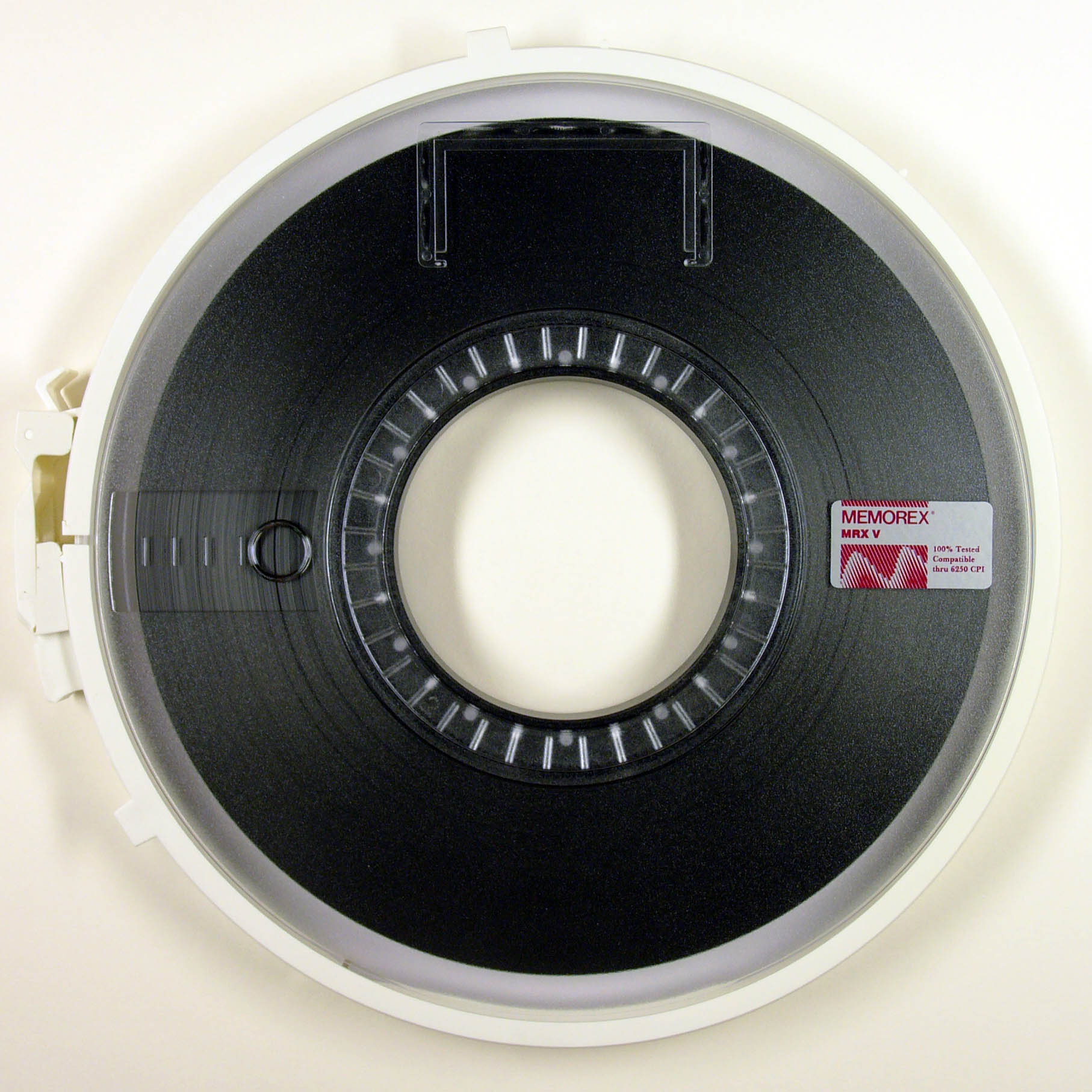
Magnetic tape that might be used as a scratch tape.

In data processing, a scratch tape is a magnetic tape that is used for temporary storage and can be reused or erased after the completion of a job or processing run. During the early years of computing, when magnetic tape was the primary form of mass storage, many programs, notably sorting routines, required such temporary storage.

== See also ==
- Scratch space – contemporary equivalent
- Merge sorting tape drives – paradigm application
