= Linux Assigned Names and Numbers Authority =

Central registry of names and numbers for Linux

The Linux Assigned Names and Numbers Authority (LANANA) is a central registry of names and numbers used within Linux. It was created in 2000 by H. Peter Anvin. As of 2013, it along with Filesystem Hierarchy Standard matters had moved under the Linux Standard Base, which itself operates under Linux Foundation's auspices per Russ Herrold.

== Registries ==
- Linux Device List — major and minor numbers of Linux device nodes, and their standard locations in the /dev directory
- Linux Zone Unicode Assignments — code points assigned for Linux within the Private Use Area of Unicode
- Several namespace registries for the Linux Standard Base

== History ==
The Linux Device List was created in 1992 by Rick Miller, and he maintained it until 1993. In 1995, it was adopted by H. Peter Anvin. In 2000, he created LANANA to maintain the list and other similar lists in the future. The name of the registry was a playful reference to IANA, the central registry of names and numbers used in the Internet.

In 2002, LANANA became an official workgroup of the Free Standards Group.

As of 2024, the official registry of allocated device numbers and /dev directory is in the Linux kernel documentation in The Linux kernel user's and administrator's guide part detailing Linux Device List.
