= Scratch space =

Scratch space is space on the hard disk drive that is dedicated for storage of temporary user data, by analogy of "scratch paper." It is unreliable by intention and has no backup. Scratch disks may occasionally be set to erase all data at regular intervals so that the disk space is left free for future use. The management of scratch disk space is typically dynamic, occurring when needed. Its advantage is that it is faster than e.g. network filesystems.

Scratch space is commonly used in scientific computing workstations, and in graphic design programs such as Adobe Photoshop. It is used when programs need to use more data than can be stored in system RAM. A common error in that program is "scratch disks full", which occurs when one has the scratch disks configured to be on the boot drive. Many computer users gradually fill up their primary hard drive with permanent data, slowly reducing the amount of space the scratch disk may take up.

Partitioning off a significant fraction of the boot hard drive and leaving that space empty will ensure a reliable scratch disk. Hard drive space, on a per-gigabyte basis, is far cheaper than RAM, though performs far slower. Although dedicating a separate physical drive from the main operating system and software can improve performance, a scratch disk will not match RAM for speed.

== See also ==
- Scratch tape
- Swap partition
- Temporary folder
- TMPDIR
