= Filesystem Hierarchy Standard =

Linux standard for directory structure

- Abbreviation: FHS
- Status: Published
- Year started: 14 February 1994; 32 years ago
- Latest version: 3.0; 3 June 2015; 11 years ago
- Organization: FreeDesktop.org; Previously: Linux Foundation
- Domain: Directory structure
- Website: Official website

The Filesystem Hierarchy Standard (FHS) is a reference describing the conventions used for the layout of Unix-like systems. It has been made popular by its use in Linux distributions, but it is used by other Unix-like systems as well. The latest version of the standard, version 3.0, was originally released on 3 June 2015 by the Linux Foundation. It was republished on 6 November 2025 by FreeDesktop, which has since assumed maintenance of the specification.

== Directory structure ==
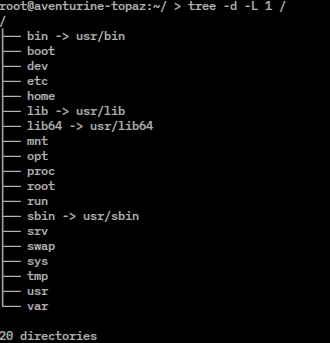
Filesystem hierarchy in openSUSE

In the FHS directory structure, all files and directories appear under the root directory /, even if they are stored on different physical or virtual devices. Some of these directories only exist in a particular system if certain subsystems, such as the X Window System, are installed.

Most of these directories exist in all Unix-like operating systems and are generally used in much the same way; however, the descriptions here are those used specifically for the FHS and are not considered authoritative for platforms other than Linux.

Directory	Description
/	Primary hierarchy root and root directory of the entire file system hierarchy.
/bin	Essential command binaries that need to be available in single-user mode, including to bring up the system or repair it, for all users (e.g., cat, ls, cp).
/boot	Boot loader files (e.g., kernels, initrd).
/dev	Device files (e.g., /dev/null, /dev/disk0, /dev/sda1, /dev/tty, /dev/random).
/etc	Host-specific system-wide configuration files. There has been controversy over the meaning of the name itself. In early versions of the UNIX Implementation Document from Bell Labs, /etc is referred to as the etcetera directory, as this directory historically held everything that did not belong elsewhere (however, the FHS restricts /etc to static configuration files and may not contain binaries). Since the publication of early documentation, the directory name has been re-explained in various ways. Later interpretations include backronyms such as "Editable Text Configuration" or "Extended Tool Chest".
/etc/opt	Configuration files for add-on packages stored in /opt.
/etc/sgml	Configuration files, such as catalogs, for software that processes SGML.
/etc/X11	Configuration files for the X Window System, version 11.
/etc/xml	Configuration files, such as catalogs, for software that processes XML.
/home	Users' home directories, containing saved files, personal settings, etc.
/lib	Libraries essential for the binaries in /bin and /sbin.
/lib<qual>	Alternate format essential libraries. These are typically used on systems that support more than one executable code format, such as systems supporting 32-bit and 64-bit versions of an instruction set. Such directories are optional, but if they exist, they have some requirements.
/media	Mount points for removable media such as CD-ROMs (appeared in FHS-2.3 in 2004).
/mnt	Temporarily mounted filesystems.
/opt	Add-on application software packages.
/proc	Virtual filesystem providing process and kernel information as files. In Linux, corresponds to a procfs mount. Generally, automatically generated and populated by the system, on the fly.
/root	Home directory for the root user.
/run	Run-time variable data: Information about the running system since last boot, e.g., currently logged-in users and running daemons. Files under this directory must be either removed or truncated at the beginning of the boot process, but this is not necessary on systems that provide this directory as a temporary filesystem (tmpfs) (appeared in FHS-3.0 in 2015).
/sbin	Essential system binaries (e.g., fsck, init, route).
/srv	Site-specific data served by this system, such as data and scripts for web servers, data offered by FTP servers, and repositories for version control systems (appeared in FHS-2.3 in 2004).
/sys	Contains information about devices, drivers, and some kernel features.
/tmp	Directory for temporary files (see also /var/tmp). Often not preserved between system reboots and may be severely size-restricted.
/usr	Secondary hierarchy for read-only user data; contains the majority of (multi-)user utilities and applications. (Note: The name is historical, and dates back to when /usr was used for user home directories on Unix; see the entry for /usr in the table in Unix filesystem § Conventional directory layout.) Should be shareable and read-only.
/usr/bin	Non-essential command binaries (not needed in single-user mode); for all users.
/usr/include	Standard include files.
/usr/lib	Libraries for the binaries in /usr/bin and /usr/sbin.
/usr/libexec	Binaries run by other programs that are not intended to be executed directly by users or shell scripts (optional).
/usr/lib<qual>	Alternative-format libraries (e.g., /usr/lib32 for 32-bit libraries on a 64-bit machine (optional)).
/usr/local	Tertiary hierarchy for local data, specific to this host. Typically has further subdirectories (e.g., bin, lib, share). (Note: Historically and strictly according to the standard, /usr/local is for data that must be stored on the local host (as opposed to /usr, which may be mounted across a network). Most of the time /usr/local is used for installing software/data that are not part of the standard operating system distribution (in such case, /usr would only contain software/data that are part of the standard operating system distribution). It is possible that the FHS standard may in the future be changed to reflect this de facto convention.)
/usr/sbin	Non-essential system binaries (e.g., daemons for various network services).
/usr/share	Architecture-independent (shared) data.
/usr/src	Source code (e.g., the kernel source code with its header files).
/usr/X11R6	X Window System, Version 11, Release 6 (up to FHS-2.3, optional).
/var	Variable files: files whose content is expected to continually change during normal operation of the system, such as logs, spool files, and temporary e-mail files.
/var/cache	Application cache data. Such data are locally generated as a result of time-consuming I/O or calculation. The application must be able to regenerate or restore the data. The cached files can be deleted without loss of data.
/var/lib	State information. Persistent data modified by programs as they run (e.g., databases, packaging system metadata, etc.).
/var/lock	Lock files. Files keeping track of resources currently in use.
/var/log	Log files. Various logs.
/var/mail	Mailbox files. In some distributions, these files may be located in the deprecated /var/spool/mail.
/var/opt	Variable data from add-on packages that are stored in /opt.
/var/run	Run-time variable data. This directory contains system information data describing the system since it was booted. In FHS 3.0, /var/run is replaced by /run; a system should either continue to provide a /var/run directory or provide a symbolic link from /var/run to /run for backward compatibility.
/var/spool	Spool for tasks waiting to be processed (e.g., print queues and outgoing mail queue). Formerly also contained user mailbox files at /var/spool/mail.
/var/tmp	Temporary files to be preserved between reboots.

== FHS compliance ==
Most Linux distributions follow the Filesystem Hierarchy Standard and declare it their own policy to maintain FHS compliance. GoboLinux and NixOS provide examples of intentionally non-compliant filesystem implementations.

Some distributions generally follow the standard but deviate from it in some areas. The FHS is a "trailing standard", and so documents common practices at a point in time. Of course, times change, and distribution goals and needs call for experimentation. Some common deviations include:

- Modern Linux distributions include a /sys directory as a virtual filesystem (sysfs, comparable to /proc, which is a procfs), which stores and allows modification of the devices connected to the system, whereas many traditional Unix-like operating systems use /sys as a symbolic link to the kernel source tree.
- Many modern Unix-like systems (such as FreeBSD and OpenBSD) via their ports systems install third-party packages into /usr/local, while keeping code considered part of the operating system in /usr.
- Some Linux distributions no longer differentiate between /lib and /usr/lib and have /lib symlinked to /usr/lib.
- Some Linux distributions no longer differentiate between /bin and /usr/bin and between /sbin and /usr/sbin. They may symlink /bin to /usr/bin and /sbin to /usr/sbin. Other distributions choose to consolidate all four, symlinking them to /usr/bin.

Modern Linux distributions include a /run directory as a temporary filesystem (tmpfs), which stores volatile runtime data, following the FHS version 3.0. According to the FHS version 2.3, such data were stored in /var/run, but this was a problem in some cases because this directory is not always available at early boot. As a result, these programs have had to resort to workarounds, such as using /dev/.udev, /dev/.mdadm, /dev/.systemd or /dev/.mount directories, even though the device directory is not intended for such data. Among other advantages, this makes the system easier to use normally with the root filesystem mounted read-only. For example, below are the changes Debian made in its 2013 Wheezy release:

- /dev/.* → /run/*
- /dev/shm → /run/shm
- /dev/shm/* → /run/*
- /etc/* (writeable files) → /run/*
- /lib/init/rw → /run
- /var/lock → /run/lock
- /var/run → /run
- /tmp → /run/tmp

== History ==
FHS was created as the FSSTND (short for "Filesystem Standard"), largely based on similar standards for other Unix-like operating systems, such as the Version 7 Unix hier(7) from 1979, the SunOS 4.x filesystem(7) and its successor, the Solaris filesystem(7), and the FreeBSD hier(7).

=== Release history ===
Version	Release date	Notes
1.0	1994-02-14	FSSTND
1.1	1994-10-09	FSSTND
1.2	1995-03-28	FSSTND
2.0	1997-10-26	FHS 2.0 is the direct successor for FSSTND 1.2. Name of the standard was changed to Filesystem Hierarchy Standard.
2.1	2000-04-12	FHS
2.2	2001-05-23	FHS
2.3	2004-01-29	FHS
3.0	2015-05-18	FHS
Legend: Unsupported Latest version

== See also ==
- Hierarchical file system
- Unix directory structure
- XDG Base Directory Specification
