= Subgraph (operating system) =

Subgraph OS
- OS family: Linux (Unix-like)
- Working state: Current
- Source model: Open source
- Final preview: 2017.09.22 / 22 September 2017; 9 years ago
- Repository: github.com/orgs/subgraph/repositories
- Kernel type: Monolithic (Linux)
- Userland: GNU
- Influenced by: Tails, Qubes OS
- License: GPLv3+
- Official website: subgraph.com

Subgraph OS is a security oriented Linux distribution, designed to be resistant to surveillance and interference by sophisticated adversaries over the Internet. It has been mentioned by Edward Snowden as showing future potential.

The initial version of Subgraph OS was based on Debian and designed to be locked down, with a reduced attack surface, to increase the difficulty to carry out certain classes of attack against it. This was accomplished through system hardening and a proactive, ongoing focus on security and attack resistance. Subgraph OS also placed emphasis on ensuring the integrity of installed software packages through deterministic compilation.

The project appeared to have come to a standstill, with the last update of the project's blog for years being in September 2017, and no updates to GitHub repositories. However, in January 2025 a new release with what has been termed "Citadel", as the base system of Subgraph, was announced (custom built per OpenEmbedded).

== History ==
Notable features of Subgraph OS's early version (2016/17) included:

- Linux kernel hardened with the grsecurity and PaX patchset.
- Linux namespaces and xpra for application containment.
- Mandatory file system encryption during installation using LUKS.
- Configurable firewall rules to automatically ensure that network connections for installed applications are made using the Tor anonymity network. Default settings ensure that each application's communication is transmitted via an independent circuit on the network.
- GNOME Shell integration for the OZ virtualization client, which runs apps inside a secure Linux container, targeting ease-of-use by everyday users.

=== Security ===
Subgraph OS's sandbox containers have been critiqued by Micah Lee in 2017 as inferior to Qubes OS's virtualization. An attacker was able to trick a Subgraph user to run a malicious unsandboxed script via the default Nautilus file manager or in the terminal. It was also possible to run malicious code containing .desktop files (which are used to launch applications). Malware could also bypass Subgraph OS's application firewall. Also, by design, Subgraph did not isolate the network stack like Qubes OS.

== See also ==
- Tails (operating system)
- Qubes OS
