= /dev/zero =

Special file in Unix-like operating systems

/dev/zero is a special file in Unix-like operating systems that provides as many null characters (ASCII NUL, 0x00) as are read from it. One of the typical uses is to provide a character stream for initializing data storage.

== Function ==
Read operations from /dev/zero return as many null characters (0x00) as requested in the read operation.

All write operations to /dev/zero succeed with no other effects. /dev/null is more commonly used for this purpose.

When /dev/zero is memory-mapped, e.g., with mmap, to the virtual address space, it is equivalent to using anonymous memory; i.e. memory not connected to any file.

== History ==
/dev/zero was introduced in 1988 in SunOS-4.0 to allow a mappable BSS segment for shared libraries using anonymous memory. HP-UX 8.x introduced the MAP_ANONYMOUS flag for mmap(), which maps anonymous memory directly without a need to open /dev/zero. Since the late 1990s, MAP_ANONYMOUS or MAP_ANON are supported by most UNIX versions, removing the original purpose of /dev/zero.

== Examples ==
Erasing a USB flash drive using DD:

dd if=/dev/zero of=/dev/<destination drive>

This may not perform a secure erasure and may not destroy any data, but may take significantly more time than required for this purpose.

Creating a 1 MiB file, named foobar, filled with null characters:

head -c $((1024 * 1024)) /dev/zero >foobar

== See also ==
- Unix philosophy
- Standard streams
- /dev
- /dev/full
