= Wom language =

Wom is the name of two different languages:

- Wom language (Nigeria)
- Wom language (Papua New Guinea)
