= Write-only memory (joke) =

Humorous fictional type of computer memory

Write-only memory (WOM), the opposite of read-only memory (ROM), began as a humorous reference to a memory device that could be written to but not read, as there seemed to be no practical use for a memory circuit from which data could not be retrieved. However, it was eventually recognized that write-only memory also describes certain functionalities in microprocessor systems. The concept is still often used as a joke or euphemism for a failed memory device.

The first use of the term is generally attributed to Signetics, whose write-only memory literature, created in 1972 as in-house practical joke, is frequently referenced within the electronics industry, a staple of software engineering lexicons, and included in "best hoaxes" collections.

== Signetics ==
A "Write-Only Memory" datasheet was created "as a lark" by Signetics engineer John G "Jack" Curtis, inspired by a fictitious and humorous vacuum tube datasheet from the 1940s. Considered "an icebreaker", it was deliberately included in the Signetics catalog.

Roy L Twitty, a Signetics PR representative, released a tongue-in-cheek press release touting WOM on April 1, 1973. Instead of the more conventional characteristic curves, the 25120 "fully encoded, 9046×N, Random Access, write-only-memory" data sheet included meaningless diagrams of "bit capacity vs. Temp.", "Iff vs. Vff", "Number of pins remaining vs. number of socket insertions", and "AQL vs. selling price". The fictional device required a 6.3 V_{AC} V_{ff} (vacuum tube filament) supply, a +10 V_{cc} (double the V_{cc} of standard TTL logic of the day), and V_{dd} of 0±2% volt (i.e. ground). It was specified to run between 0 and −70 °C.

== Apple ==
In 1982, Apple published their official Apple IIe Reference Manual (part number A2L2005), which included two references to write-only memory:

On page 233:

- bit bucket: The final resting place of all information; see write-only memory.

On page 250:

- write-only memory: A form of computer memory into which information can be stored but never, ever retrieved, developed under government contract in 1975 by Professor Homberg T. Farnsfarfle. Farnsfarfle's original prototype, approximately one inch on each side, has so far been used to store more than 100 trillion words of surplus federal information. Farnsfarfle's critics have denounced his project as a six-million-dollar boondoggle, but his defenders point out that this excess information would have cost more than 250 billion dollars to store in conventional media.

Originally written by Bruce Tognazzini, the write-only memory definition was not without its share of internal controversy. The second sentence originally read, "Approximately one inch on each side, Farnsfarfle's original prototype has so far been used...." The editors insisted the original contained a misplaced modifier whereas Tognazzini was equally adamant that Farnsfarfle was a very small man. The editors won.

== Book ==
The 1995 Computer Contradictionary book discusses EWOM, or Erasable Write-Only Memory (an analogy of EPROM), a memory copyrighted by IBM (Irish Business Machines), which allows the data to be written to and then erased, for memory re-use.

With the explosive growth of the amount of digital video data online and in private use, there emerged a common joke that video tapes and other analog video media were "write only memory", as very little of it was still viewed.

== Other members of the family ==
The 25120 WOM joined a family of equally useless, fictitious devices made before and since, including the dark bulb, dark-emitting diode, WAS gate, and Inoperational Amplifier; and earlier, the Umac 606 Infernal Anode Phantasatron and the Electrovoice Rearaxial Softspeaker. (The Phantastron is a real, if obsolete, circuit for generating precision sawtooth waves.)

== See also ==
- Write-only memory (engineering) – Computing concept
- /dev/null – Device file that discards all data written to it
- FINO – Humorous scheduling algorithm "First In, Nothing Out"
- Turbo encabulator – Fictional electromechanical machine
