= Null device =

Device file that discards all data written to it

In some operating systems, the null device is a device file that discards all data written to it but reports that the write operation succeeded. This device is called /dev/null on Unix and Unix-like systems, NUL: (see TOPS-20) or NUL on CP/M and DOS (internally \DEV\NUL), nul on OS/2 and newer Windows systems (internally \Device\Null on Windows NT), NIL: on Amiga operating systems, and NL: on OpenVMS. In Windows Powershell, the equivalent is $null. It provides no data to any process that reads from it, yielding EOF immediately. In IBM operating systems DOS/360 and successors (Note: The most recent being z/VSE.) and also in OS/360 and successors (Note: The most recent being z/OS.) such files would be assigned in JCL to DD DUMMY.

In programmer jargon, especially Unix jargon, it may also be called the bit bucket or black hole.

== History ==
/dev/null is described as an empty regular file in Version 4 Unix.

The Version 5 Unix manual describes a /dev/null device with modern semantics.

== Usage ==
The null device is typically used for disposing of unwanted output streams of a process, or as a convenient empty file for input streams. This is usually done by redirection. For example, tar -c -f /dev/null "example directory" can be used to dry-run the TAR file archiving utility to see if any errors would occur but without writing any file.

The /dev/null device is a special file, not a directory, so one cannot move a whole file or directory into it with the Unix mv command.

Unix shell command cat /dev/null would do nothing, equivalent to true or : command.

== References in computer culture ==
This entity is a common inspiration for technical jargon expressions and metaphors by Unix programmers, e.g. "please send complaints to /dev/null", "my mail got archived in /dev/null", and "redirect to /dev/null"—being jocular ways of saying, respectively: "don't bother sending complaints", "my mail was deleted", and "go away". The iPhone Dev Team commonly uses the phrase "send donations to /dev/null", meaning they do not accept donations. The fictitious person name "Dave (or Devin) Null" is sometimes similarly used (e.g., "send complaints to Dave Null"). In 1996, Dev Null was an animated virtual reality character created by Leo Laporte for MSNBC's computer and technology TV series The Site. Dev/null is also the name of a vampire hacker in the computer game Vampire: The Masquerade – Redemption. A 2002 advertisement for the Titanium PowerBook G4 reads "Sends other UNIX boxes to /dev/null."

The null device is also a favorite subject of technical jokes, such as warning users that the system's /dev/null is already 98% full. The 1995 April Fool's issue of the German magazine c't reported on an enhanced /dev/null chip that would efficiently dispose of the incoming data by converting it to a flicker on an internal glowing LED.

Dev/Null is also the name of an electronic dance music producer and jungle DJ.

== See also ==
- /dev/full
- /dev/zero
- Device file
- Filesystem Hierarchy Standard
- Memory hole
- rm (Unix)
- Standard streams
- Unix philosophy
- Write-only memory
