= Et cetera =

Latin expression

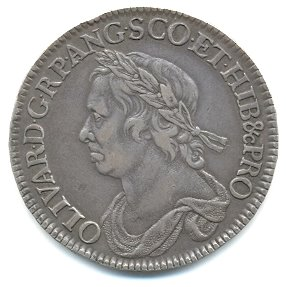
The &c (et ceterarum, "Protector of England, Scotland and Ireland and another") shows that Oliver Cromwell did not renounce the English claims on France

Et cetera (English: /ɛtˈsɛt(ə)rə, ɪt-/, Latin: [ɛt ˈkeːtɛra]), abbreviated to etc. or et cet., is a Latin expression that is used in English to mean "and all the rest". The ampersand "&" is a ligature of "et", thus it can also be abbreviated &c. . Translated literally from Latin, et can mean 'and', while cētĕra can mean 'the rest'; thus, the expression translates to 'and the rest'.

Et cetera is a calque (loanword/phrase) of the Koine Greek καὶ τὰ ἕτερα (kai ta hetera) meaning 'and the other things'. The typical Modern Greek form is και τα λοιπά (kai ta loipá) 'and the remainder'.

== Spelling and usage ==
The one-word spelling etcetera appears in at least one dictionary. The abbreviated form &c. or &c is still occasionally used—the ampersand ⟨&⟩, derives from a ligature of et.

The phrase et cetera is often used to denote the logical continuation of some sort of series of descriptions. For example, in the following expression:

We will need a lot of bread: wheat, granary, wholemeal, etc. on our menu.

In this case of a use at the end of a list without conjunction, a comma is typically written in front of the phrase (but see Serial comma). If etc. is used at the end of a sentence, the dot is not doubled. If it occurs at the end of exclamations, questions or a clause, the dot is not suppressed but followed by whatever punctuation marks are required to end or continue the sentence.

etc. in Fraktur

In blackletter (Gothic or Fraktur) typography, the r rotunda ⟨ꝛ⟩ is sometimes used for et in place of the similar-looking Tironian et ⟨⁊⟩, followed by c, to yield ꝛc.

== Similar Latin expressions ==
- In lists of people, et alia (abbreviated as et al., meaning "and others") is used in place of etc.
- In lists of places, et alibi may be used, which is also abbreviated et al.; et alibi means "and elsewhere".
- In references to literature or texts in general, et sequentes (versus) or et sequentia 'and the words etc. following' (abbreviated et seq., plural et seqq.) are used to indicate that only the first portion of a known reference is given explicitly, with broad reference to the following passages which logically follow in sequence to the explicit reference. Hence "Title VII, Section 4, Subsection A, Paragraph 1, et seq." might refer to many subsections or paragraphs which follow Paragraph 1. Legal briefs and legislative documents make heavy use of et seq. Notice that there is a functional difference between et seq. and etc. Et seq. and its variations refer specifically to known text; etc. may do so too, but is more likely to leave the reader to supply the unspecified items for themself. It would not be helpful to say: "Various paragraphs of import similar to those in Title VII, Sections 4, 7, and 2 et seq." though it might make sense to use etc. in such a context.

== In popular culture ==
In the 1956 film The King and I, Yul Brynner repeatedly used the expression "...et cetera, et cetera, et cetera..." in his portrayal of King Mongkut of Siam, to characterize the king as wanting to impress everyone with his breadth of great knowledge and the importance of one with no need to expound. This reflected the usage in the novel, Anna and the King of Siam, which expressed that king's playful understanding of innumerable things with the phrase, "&c., &c."

== Other uses ==
/etc is a directory in UNIX-like operating systems, responsible mainly for storing system-wide configuration files, preferences, etc.

== See also ==
- Ellipses (...) may be used for a similar function
- List of Latin phrases
