= Firejail =

Linux security sandbox tool

- Written in: C
- License: GPL-2.0 license
- Website: firejail.wordpress.com
- Repository: github.com/netblue30/firejail

Firejail is a security sandbox tool created by Antti Kantee designed to enhance the security of applications by isolating them in a sandbox environment. It is a free and open-source software written in the C programming language available for Linux-based operating systems with kernel version 3.x or newer.

== Features ==
- Sandboxing: Firejail allows users to run applications in isolated environments, preventing them from accessing sensitive files and system resources.
- SELinux and AppArmor Integration: It integrates with SELinux (Security-Enhanced Linux) and AppArmor to provide robust security policies.
- Resource Limitation: Firejail can limit the resources (CPU, memory, etc.) that a sandboxed application can use.
- Network Isolation: It can restrict network access for sandboxed applications, enhancing security against network-based attacks.
- Filesystem Access Control: Firejail provides fine-grained control over which files and directories an application can access.

== Usage ==
Firejail is typically used to run potentially untrusted applications or scripts in a controlled environment. It can be invoked directly from the command line or configured to run specific applications automatically. If one is uncomfortable with using a CLI, they can also use Firetools, which is made by the same developer.
