= Sysfs =

Pseudo file system provided by the Linux kernel

sysfs is a pseudo file system provided by the Linux kernel that exports information about various kernel subsystems, hardware devices, and associated device drivers from the kernel's device model to user space through virtual files. In addition to providing information about various devices and kernel subsystems, exported virtual files are also used for their configuration.

sysfs provides functionality similar to the sysctl mechanism found in BSD operating systems, with the difference that sysfs is implemented as a virtual file system instead of being a purpose-built kernel mechanism, and that, in Linux, sysctl configuration parameters are made available at /proc/sys/ as part of procfs, not sysfs which is mounted at /sys/.

== History ==
During the 2.5 development cycle, the Linux driver model was introduced to fix the following shortcomings of version 2.4:

- No unified method of representing driver-device relationships existed.
- There was no generic hotplug mechanism.
- procfs was cluttered with non-process information.

Sysfs was designed to export the information present in the device tree which would then no longer clutter up procfs. It was written by Patrick Mochel. Maneesh Soni later wrote the sysfs backing store patch to reduce memory usage on large systems.

During the next year of 2.5 development the infrastructural capabilities of the driver model and driverfs began to prove useful to other subsystems. kobjects were developed to provide a central object management mechanism and driverfs was renamed to sysfs to represent its subsystem agnosticism.

Sysfs is mounted under the /sys mount point. If it is not mounted automatically during initialization, it can be mounted manually using the mount command: mount -t sysfs sysfs /sys.

== Supported buses ==
ACPI
Exports information about ACPI devices.

PCI
Exports information about PCI and PCI Express devices.

PCI Express
Exports information about PCI Express devices.

USB
Exports information about USB devices.

SCSI
Exports information about mass storage devices, including USB, SATA and NVMe interfaces.

S/390 buses
As the S/390 architecture contains devices not found elsewhere, special buses have been created:
- css: Contains subchannels (currently the only driver provided is for I/O subchannels).
- ccw: Contains channel attached devices (driven by CCWs).
- ccwgroup: Artificial devices, created by the user and consisting of ccw devices. Replaces some of the 2.4 chandev functionality.
- iucv: Artificial devices like netiucv devices which use VM's IUCV interface.

== Sysfs and userspace ==
Sysfs is used by several utilities to access information about hardware and its driver (kernel modules) such as udev or HAL. Scripts have been written to access information previously obtained via procfs, and some scripts configure device drivers and devices via their attributes.

== See also ==
- procfs
- configfs
- tmpfs
- sysctl, alternative way of exporting configuration used in BSD systems
