= Linux kernel version history =

Version history of the Linux kernel

This article documents the broad, wide version history of the Linux kernel, a free, open-source, and Unix-like kernel that is used on many computer systems and web servers worldwide.

Since the Linux kernel's creation by Linus Torvalds in 1991, it had rapidly gained popularity as many developers started contributing to the project.

The kernel became self-hosting as of version 0.11 in December 1991. The version 1.0.0 of the kernel was released on March 1994, which consisted of around 176,250 lines in the original unmodified source code.

The most recent stable release of the Linux kernel is 7.3, which was released on 18 October 2026.

== Explanation ==
In contrast to semantic versioning, the major version carries no intrinsic meaning for the kernel, as Linux promises stable interfaces and behavior even when the major version changes. However, since version 3.x, minor versions have been capped around 20 to avoid the false perception that changes between large minor versions (e.g. from 5.30 to 5.31) would be less voluminous or impactful than changes between smaller minor versions (e.g. from 6.1 to 6.2).

Each feature release – identified by the first two numbers of a release version – is designated one of the following levels of support:

- Stable/Mainline; supported until next stable version and/or 3 months after that.
- Long-term support (LTS); releases are maintained for a few years.
- Super-long-term support (SLTS); releases maintained further for many more years by the Civil Infrastructure Platform (CIP).

== Releases 7.x.y ==
On 8 February 2026, Linus Torvalds announced that the next kernel release will be published as version 7.0. Following the usual release cycle of about two months for every new version, kernel 7.0 was released on 12 April 2026.

| Version | Original release date | Last release | Maintainer | EOL | Prominent features | Notes |
|---|---|---|---|---|---|---|
| 7.4 | Future Release | 7.4-rc3 | Linus Torvalds | | | |
| 7.3 | 18 October 2026 | 7.3.5 | Greg Kroah-Hartman | | 95% faster throughput on certain tasks for Btrfs users; Improved performance for Ext4 by allowing parallel I/O write operations; Improved cluster-aware task scheduling for Intel's Alder Lake, Lunar Lake and Panther Lake; Fix for Kernel Samepage Merging freezing heavily under high memory usage, dropping lag from 700ms to under 2ms; zsmalloc slowdown fixed which zram and zswap use to store compressed memory. Gives big benefit on slow hardware with low parallel cores.; Fixed kernel freezing cores on flushing memory caches; New library APIs for the AES encryption modes for ECB, CBC, CBC-CTS, CTR, XCTR, XTS, GCM, and CCM; NFS improvements by optimizing I/O submission when not reclaiming memory, along with various bug fixes.; FUSE gains massive read and write performance boost by optimizing I/O buffer pools; Allocating systematic cache for F2FS metadata; Fixing support for RV1106 SAR-ADC; drivers/staging gets code cleanups and minor fixes; Loads of IIO driver updates + additions for binder driver updates and removal of the SGI XP and GRU drivers; Rework of cached attributes; Fixes for PowerPC, mainly involving in fixing memory overflow; Minor I2C fixes for DMA resource management.; Multiple fixes/patchsets for the DRM module improving performance for the free to use, open-source nouveau driver | This release may be an LTS release (usually the last release per calendar year gets designated as LTS, though 7.4 may still fall into 2026) |
| 7.2 | 16 August 2026 | 7.2.15 | Greg Kroah-Hartman | 1 November 2026 | Cache Aware Scheduling was merged; Partial support for Apple M3; Added support for USB4STREAM; Deprecation of AF_ALG and removal of insecure crypto driver code; Intel KPT support for QAT devices; Added HDMI 2.1 FRL support to the AMDGPU driver; Enabled Btrfs large folios by default; Removal of the Strcpy API | |
| 7.1 | 14 June 2026 | 7.1.13 | Greg Kroah-Hartman | 2 September 2026 | Added new NTFS driver (formally NTFSPLUS); Removal of legacy code, including the i486, some PCI and PCMCIA drivers, bus mouse, etc.; Apple SMC power driver for battery information on Apple Silicon; Enabled Intel FRED by default; Real Time support enabled on 32-bit ARM; New Coreboot framebuffer driver; Intel QAT Zstd support; Power reporting for AMD Ryzen AI NPUs | This release removes all legacy i486 support, reducing the number of platforms the latest kernels can be used on. |
| 7.0 | 12 April 2026 | 7.0.14 | Greg Kroah-Hartman (formerly Linus Torvalds till the release cycle ended) | 27 June 2026 | Introduced fsnotify to create a standard API for file IO error reporting; Live health monitoring on XFS filesystems; Added support for Clang capability analysis; Better io_uring support for filters; open_tree(2) function extended; Phase II swap performance with swap table; Time slice extension added to rseq; Preemption selection simplified; AccECN enabled by default; BTRFS experimental support for the remap tree; kmalloc_obj() introduced | Following previous conventions, Linux 7.0 is not a major upgrade over the Linux 6.x series, but instead what would have been considered Linux 6.20. |
Legend: Unsupported Supported Latest version Preview version

== Releases 6.x.y ==
| Version | Original release date | Last release | Maintainer | EOL | Prominent features | Notes |
|---|---|---|---|---|---|---|
| 6.19 | 8 February 2026 | 6.19.14 | Greg Kroah-Hartman | 22 April 2026 | listns(2) system call added for namespaces; Live update orchestrator; Support for PCIe Link Encryption; Improvements to the BTRFS filesystem; EXT4 filesystem now supports block sizes that are larger than the page size; Graphical updates including a color pipeline API and a sharpness property; Updates to io_uring; Added support for SFrame stack unwinding | |
| 6.18 | 30 November 2025 | 6.18.64 | Greg Kroah-Hartman | December 2028 | Improved kernel memory allocation performance with slub sheaves; A device mapper target for persistent cache; Process Namespaces as file handles; Support for Accurate Explicit Congestion Notification in TCP; Add support for PSP encryption of TCP connections; Better swapping performance; UDP receive performance improvements; BPF signed programs; More scalable NFS servers by removing caching; Introduction of memdesc_flags_t, for a future leaner struct page; Remove bcachefs core code | 26th LTS release |
| 6.17 | 28 September 2025 | 6.17.13 | Greg Kroah-Hartman | 18 December 2025 | Easier CPU bug mitigation selection; New file_getattr/file_setattr system calls; Better and more secure core dumping; Initial priority inheritance support for solving priority inversion; Unconditionally compile task scheduler with SMP support; Per NUMA node proactive reclaim, for better control of memory reclaim on NUMA systems; Introduce a new fallocate(2) flag, for more efficient writing of zeroes; Runtime Verification: Support for Linear temporal logic monitors; Change bcachefs status from 'Supported' to 'Externally maintained' | |
| 6.16 | 27 July 2025 | 6.16.12 | Greg Kroah-Hartman | 12 October 2025 | XFS support for large atomic writes; USB audio offload support; Initial support for Intel Trusted Domain Extensions; Allow to zero-copy send TCP payloads from DMABUF memory; Automatic weighted interleaved memory allocation policy; Support for Intel Advanced Performance Extensions; Add support for sending coredumps over an AF_UNIX socket; Futex improvements; Some Ext4 performance improvements; Build optimization for the local CPU on x86 | |
| 6.15 | 25 May 2025 | 6.15.11 | Greg Kroah-Hartman | 20 August 2025 | Btrfs: fast Zstd compression support | |
| 6.14 | 24 March 2025 | 6.14.11 | Greg Kroah-Hartman | 10 June 2025 | Improved Wine speed; Copilot keyboard key support | |
| 6.13 | 20 January 2025 | 6.13.12 | Greg Kroah-Hartman | 20 April 2025 | New handheld support; Intel Arc B series support | |
| 6.12 | 17 November 2024 | 6.12.118 | Greg Kroah-Hartman | December 2028 | Real-time support for x86/x86_64, RISC-V, and ARM64; Userspace scheduler extensions support; QR codes for DRM panic messages | 25th LTS release 5th SLTS with 10 years of support through 2035. Used in Debian 13 "Trixie" , RHEL 10.0 and OpenSuse Leap 16.1 |
| 6.11 | 15 September 2024 | 6.11.11 | Greg Kroah-Hartman | 5 December 2024 | Atomic writes support for buffered I/O; Dedicated bucket slab allocator to help protect against heap spraying; vDSO implementation of getrandom() | |
| 6.10 | 14 July 2024 | 6.10.14 | Greg Kroah-Hartman & Sasha Levin | 10 October 2024 | Memory-allocation profiling; Encrypted interactions with trusted platform modules | Named "Baby Opossum Posse". The one last minute change was made in the credits of the ReiserFS README as requested by the original developer. |
| 6.9 | 12 May 2024 | 6.9.12 | Greg Kroah-Hartman & Sasha Levin | 27 July 2024 | Improved performance for Intel Core Ultra (Meteor Lake); Support for AMD P-State Preferred Cores; Intel FRED (Flexible Return Event Delivery); Support for larger console frame-buffer fonts for 4K displays; Faster boot times for systems with lots of RAM and using HugeTLBs; DM VDO (Device Mapper Virtual Data Optimizer) mainlined; Hibernate LZ4 compression support | |
| 6.8 | 10 March 2024 | 6.8.12 | Greg Kroah-Hartman & Sasha Levin | 30 May 2024 | Deadline servers for better realtime scheduling; Multi-size transparent huge pages for anonymous memory; Two new syscalls for better mount management: listmount() and statmount(); Data type profiling with perf; Forbid users from writing to partitions used by filesystems; New system calls to deal with multiple stacked LSMs; Driver for new Intel Xe graphics | Used in Ubuntu 24.04 LTS |
| 6.7 | 7 January 2024 | 6.7.12 | Greg Kroah-Hartman & Sasha Levin | 3 April 2024 | Initial Bcachefs filesystem support; Itanium support removed; Intel Meteor Lake Graphics declared stable; Initial Nouveau support for Nvidia GSP firmware; Ability to disable IA-32 support at boot time on AMD64; Expansion of AMD Seamless Boot Support; Improvement in loading of x86 microcode; Support for RAID stripe tree, simple quota accounting, and temporary FSID added to Btrfs; JFS minor stability improvements | According to Linus Torvalds, "one of the largest kernel releases we've ever had" |
| 6.6 | 29 October 2023 | 6.6.162 | Greg Kroah-Hartman & Sasha Levin | December 2027 | The new EEVDF process scheduler was merged. It aims to replace the CFS scheduler.; Intel Shadow Stack was finally merged; Exploiting ROPs is now harder; Support for Partial SMT; Performance Improvement for CPUs with a lot of cores and shared Last Level Caches; Continued Intel Meteor Lake graphics and sound enablement/improvements; Better performance for Ext4 and io_uring; Security: add io_uring_disabled to shrink kernel's attack surface; DEFLATE compression support for EROFS | 24th LTS release The CFS scheduler was the de facto standard for 16+ years ReiserFS is now declared to be obsolete and flagged for removal in 2025. |
| 6.5 | 27 August 2023 | 6.5.13 | Greg Kroah-Hartman & Sasha Levin | 28 November 2023 | Initial USB4 v2.0 support; MIDI 2.0 support | |
| 6.4 | 25 June 2023 | 6.4.16 | Greg Kroah-Hartman & Sasha Levin | 13 September 2023 | Intel Linear Address Masking; Partial support for Apple M2; Autonomous frequency and power control on AMD Zen architecture CPUs; Support for RISC-V hibernation on future laptops; Improvements for LoongArch CPU architecture; Further Intel Meteor Lake Graphics development; 4K resolution support for Rockchip Direct Rendering Manager driver; Better AMDgpu support for the Steam Deck; Optimizations to EROFS, Btrfs, F2FS, NTFS, and Ext4; Support for Intel Lunar Lake HD Audio; Continued Wi-Fi 7 development; Quality of life improvements for Apple silicon users; Further Rust up-streaming to support the first Rust drivers; Removal of SLOB memory allocator | |
| 6.3 | 23 April 2023 | 6.3.13 | Greg Kroah-Hartman & Sasha Levin | 11 July 2023 | Even more Rust in the kernel; Initial Support for Intel Meteor Lake Display; Intel Meteor Lake VPUs ("Versatile Processing Unit") support; AMD Automatic IBRS; Intel TPMI driver was merged, hopes are this will give more control over power management.; Big Performance Improvement for EXT4. Nice Improvements for BTRFS too; IPv4 BIG TCP support, maybe better network performance; Microsoft Hyper-V nested hypervisor support.; Faster kernel builds and with lower peak memory use.; Removed support for the Intel ICC compiler. | |
| 6.2 | 19 February 2023 | 6.2.16 | Greg Kroah-Hartman & Sasha Levin | 17 May 2023 | Intel Arc drivers are now deemed "stable" and on by default.; Initial FOSS support for NVIDIA GeForce 30 Series. But performance is poor for now.; Support for Apple's M1; Call Depth Tracking as a better performance alternative to IBRS for older Intel CPUs; Some Power-savings improvements when the system is idle or lightly loaded.; Support for running Raspberry Pi in 4K@60 Hz; Better performance and scalability for running RAID5/6 in btrfs-like systems; More Rust in the kernel | |
| 6.1 | 11 December 2022 | 6.1.192 | Greg Kroah-Hartman & Sasha Levin | December 2027 August 2033 | Support for writing kernel modules in Rust; Multi-Gen LRU page reclaiming (not yet enabled by default); Btrfs performance improvements; Support for more sound hardware; Improved support for game controllers | 23rd LTS release Used in Debian 12 "Bookworm" 4th SLTS release (which CIP is planning to support until August 2033) 6.1.28 is named Curry Ramen |
| 6.0 | 2 October 2022 | 6.0.19 | Greg Kroah-Hartman & Sasha Levin | January 2023 | Performance improvements on Intel Xeon 'Ice Lake', AMD Ryzen 'Threadripper', AMD EPYC; New hardware support including Intel, AMD, Qualcomm | Named "Hurr durr I'ma [sic] ninja sloth" |
Legend: Unsupported Supported

== Releases 5.x.y ==
| Version | Original release date | Last release | Maintainer | EOL | Prominent features | Notes |
|---|---|---|---|---|---|---|
| 5.19 | 31 July 2022 | 5.19.17 | Greg Kroah-Hartman & Sasha Levin | October 2022 | Initial support for LoongArch; Support for Big TCP; More secure encrypted virtualization with AMD SEV-SNP and Intel TDX; Armv9 Scalable Matrix Extension support; Introduce Intel In-Field Scan driver to run targeted low level diagnostics outside of the CPU's architectural error detection capabilities; a.out support removed | |
| 5.18 | 22 May 2022 | 5.18.19 | Greg Kroah-Hartman & Sasha Levin | August 2022 | Support for Indirect Branch Tracking on Intel CPUs; User events; fprobe, for probing multiple functions with a single probe handler; Headers rearchitecturing preparations for faster compilation times; Stricter memcpy() compile-time bounds checking; Switch to C11 | |
| 5.17 | 20 March 2022 | 5.17.15 | Greg Kroah-Hartman & Sasha Levin | June 2022 | BPF CO-RE support; Random number generator improvements; New Real-Time Linux Analysis (RTLA) tool; Support giving names to anonymous memory; Mitigate straight-line speculation attacks | Used in Ubuntu 22.04 LTS on newer hardware Named Superb Owl |
| 5.16 | 9 January 2022 | 5.16.20 | Greg Kroah-Hartman & Sasha Levin | April 2022 | New futex_waitv() system call for faster game performance; Memory folios infrastructure for a faster memory management; Add support for AMX instructions; Improve write congestion | |
| 5.15 | 31 October 2021 | 5.15.225 | Greg Kroah-Hartman & Sasha Levin | December 2026 | New experimental NTFS file system implementation; ksmbd, an in-kernel SMB 3 server; Migrate memory pages to persistent memory in lieu of discard; DAMON, a data access monitor; Introduce process_mrelease(2) system call | 22nd LTS release; used in: Ubuntu 22.04 LTS, Slackware 15, UEK 7; Named Trick or Treat |
| 5.14 | 29 August 2021 | 5.14.21 | Greg Kroah-Hartman | November 2021 | | Used in RHEL 9.x and derivatives (Red Hat ignores LTS-Kernel, own kernel-backports) and SLE 15 SP4/openSUSE Leap 15.4 |
| 5.13 | 27 June 2021 | 5.13.19 | Greg Kroah-Hartman & Sasha Levin | September 2021 | Support for Zstd compressed modules; Landlock Linux security module | Named Opossums on Parade |
| 5.12 | 25 April 2021 | 5.12.19 | Greg Kroah-Hartman | July 2021 | | Named Frozen Wasteland |
| 5.11 | 14 February 2021 | 5.11.22 | Greg Kroah-Hartman | May 2021 | | Named "💕 Valentine's Day Edition 💕" |
| 5.10 | 13 December 2020 | 5.10.274 | Greg Kroah-Hartman & Sasha Levin | December 2026 January 2031 | Support for ARM64 memory tagging extension (MTE) | 21st LTS release; used in Debian 11 "Bullseye" 3rd SLTS release (which CIP is planning to support until January 2031) Named "Dare mighty things" |
| 5.9 | 11 October 2020 | 5.9.16 | Greg Kroah-Hartman | December 2020 | | |
| 5.8 | 2 August 2020 | 5.8.18 | Greg Kroah-Hartman | November 2020 | | |
| 5.7 | 31 May 2020 | 5.7.19 | Greg Kroah-Hartman | August 2020 | | |
| 5.6 | 29 March 2020 | 5.6.19 | Greg Kroah-Hartman | June 2020 | Initial USB4 support; Year 2038 fix for 32-bit systems; WireGuard | |
| 5.5 | 26 January 2020 | 5.5.19 | Greg Kroah-Hartman | April 2020 | | |
| 5.4 | 24 November 2019 | 5.4.302 | Greg Kroah-Hartman & Sasha Levin | December 2025 | | 20th LTS release, used in Ubuntu 20.04 LTS; 5.4-rc2 is named Nesting Opossum 5.4-rc5 is named Kleptomaniac Octopus |
| 5.3 | 15 September 2019 | 5.3.18 | Greg Kroah-Hartman | December 2019 | | |
| 5.2 | 7 July 2019 | 5.2.21 | Greg Kroah-Hartman | October 2019 | | 5.2-rc2 is named Golden Lions 5.2 is named Bobtail Squid |
| 5.1 | 5 May 2019 | 5.1.21 | Greg Kroah-Hartman | July 2019 | io_uring API, a new way to do asynchronous I/O (AIO), the older API/interface "aio" had problems and performance issues. | |
| 5.0 | 3 March 2019 | 5.0.21 | Greg Kroah-Hartman | June 2019 | | |
Legend: Unsupported Supported

== Releases 4.x.y ==
| Version | Original release date | Last release | Maintainer | EOL | Prominent features | Notes |
|---|---|---|---|---|---|---|
| 4.20 | 23 December 2018 | 4.20.17 | Greg Kroah-Hartman | March 2019 | | Named Shy Crocodile |
| 4.19 | 22 October 2018 | 4.19.325 4.19.325-cip137 | Greg Kroah-Hartman & Sasha Levin Ulrich Hecht & Pavel Machek | December 2024 January 2029 | | 19th LTS release. Used in Debian 10 "Buster". Second SLTS release (which CIP is planning to support until January 2029). Named "People's Front" |
| 4.18 | 12 August 2018 | 4.18.20 | Greg Kroah-Hartman | November 2018 | | RHEL 8.x (Red Hat ignores LTS-Kernel, own kernel-backports) |
| 4.17 | 3 June 2018 | 4.17.19 | Greg Kroah-Hartman | August 2018 | | Named Merciless Moray |
| 4.16 | 1 April 2018 | 4.16.18 | Greg Kroah-Hartman | June 2018 | | |
| 4.15 | 28 January 2018 | 4.15.18 | Greg Kroah-Hartman | April 2018 | | Used in Ubuntu 18.04 LTS |
| 4.14 | 12 November 2017 | 4.14.336 | Greg Kroah-Hartman & Sasha Levin | January 2024 | Zstd compression for Btrfs and Squashfs | 18th LTS release 4.14.1 is named Petit Gorille |
| 4.13 | 3 September 2017 | 4.13.16 | Greg Kroah-Hartman | November 2017 | | |
| 4.12 | 2 July 2017 | 4.12.14 | Greg Kroah-Hartman | September 2017 | BFQ I/O scheduler; Kyber I/O scheduler; USB-C support | |
| 4.11 | 30 April 2017 | 4.11.12 | Greg Kroah-Hartman | July 2017 | | |
| 4.10 | 19 February 2017 | 4.10.17 | Greg Kroah-Hartman | May 2017 | | 4.10-rc5 was named Anniversary Edition 4.10-rc6 was named Fearless Coyote |
| 4.9 | 11 December 2016 | 4.9.337 | Greg Kroah-Hartman & Sasha Levin | January 2023 | | 17th LTS release. Used in Debian 9 "Stretch". Named Roaring Lionus |
| 4.8 | 2 October 2016 | 4.8.17 | Greg Kroah-Hartman | January 2017 | | |
| 4.7 | 24 July 2016 | 4.7.10 | Greg Kroah-Hartman | October 2016 | Schedutil governor; Async discard support; EFI bootloader control driver | Named Psychotic Stoned Sheep |
| 4.6 | 15 May 2016 | 4.6.7 | Greg Kroah-Hartman | August 2016 | | Named Charred Weasel |
| 4.5 | 13 March 2016 | 4.5.7 | Greg Kroah-Hartman | June 2016 | | |
| 4.4 | 10 January 2016 | 4.4.302 4.4.302-cip103 | Greg Kroah-Hartman & Sasha Levin Ulrich Hecht & Pavel Machek | February 2022 January 2027 | | 16th LTS release, used in Slackware 14.2. Canonical provided extended support until April 2021. As the first kernel selected for Super Long Term Support (SLTS), the Civil Infrastructure Platform will provide support until January 2027. Used in Ubuntu 16.04 LTS |
| 4.3 | 1 November 2015 | 4.3.6 | Greg Kroah-Hartman | February 2016 | | Named Blurry Fish Butt |
| 4.2 | 30 August 2015 | 4.2.8 | Greg Kroah-Hartman | December 2015 | | Canonical provided extended support until July 2016. |
| 4.1 | 22 June 2015 | 4.1.52 | Sasha Levin (formerly Greg Kroah-Hartman) | May 2018 | | 15th LTS release. 4.1.1 was named Series 4800 |
| 4.0 | 12 April 2015 | 4.0.9 | Greg Kroah-Hartman | July 2015 | Initial live patching support; lazytime mount option | Named "Hurr durr I'ma [sic] sheep" (Internet poll) |
Legend: Unsupported Supported

== Releases 3.x.y ==
The jump from 2.6.x to 3.x wasn't because of a breaking update, but rather the first release of a new versioning scheme introduced as a more convenient system.

| Version | Original release date | Last release | Maintainer | EOL | Prominent features | Notes |
|---|---|---|---|---|---|---|
| 3.19 | 8 February 2015 | 3.19.8 | Greg Kroah-Hartman | May 2015 | | Canonical provided extended support until July 2016. |
| 3.18 | 7 December 2014 | 3.18.140 | Greg Kroah-Hartman (formerly Sasha Levin) (formerly Greg Kroah-Hartman) | May 2019 | OverlayFS; eBPF; DCTCP support | 14th LTS release, named Diseased Newt |
| 3.17 | 5 October 2014 | 3.17.8 | Greg Kroah-Hartman | January 2015 | | |
| 3.16 | 3 August 2014 | 3.16.85 | Ben Hutchings (formerly Greg Kroah-Hartman) | Maintained until October 2014, then May 2016 to June 2020 | | 13th LTS release. Was used in Debian 8 "Jessie". Canonical provided extended support until April 2016. 3.16.1 was named Museum of Fishiegoodies |
| 3.15 | 8 June 2014 | 3.15.10 | Greg Kroah-Hartman | August 2014 | LZ4 compression support for zram | |
| 3.14 | 30 March 2014 | 3.14.79 | Greg Kroah-Hartman | September 2016 | zram support | 12th LTS release, named Shuffling Zombie Juror |
| 3.13 | 19 January 2014 | 3.13.11 | Greg Kroah-Hartman | April 2014 | Btrfs considered stable | Canonical provided extended support until April 2016. Named One Giant Leap for Frogkind (NASA LADEE launch photo) Used in Ubuntu 14.04 LTS |
| 3.12 | 3 November 2013 | 3.12.74 | Jiří Slabý (formerly Greg Kroah-Hartman) | May 2017 | | 11th LTS release, named Suicidal Squirrel |
| 3.11 | 2 September 2013 | 3.11.10 | Greg Kroah-Hartman | November 2013 | zswap support | Canonical provided extended support until August 2014. Named Linux for Workgroups after the 20 years of Windows 3.11 |
| 3.10 | 30 June 2013 | 3.10.108 | Willy Tarreau (formerly Greg Kroah-Hartman) | November 2017 | bcache support | 10th LTS release, 3.10.6 was named TOSSUG Baby Fish used in Slackware 14.1 RHEL 7.x |
| 3.9 | 28 April 2013 | 3.9.11 | Greg Kroah-Hartman | July 2013 | dm-cache support; suspend-freeze; Intel P-state support | 3.9.6 was named Black Squirrel Wakeup Call |
| 3.8 | 18 February 2013 | 3.8.13 | Greg Kroah-Hartman | May 2013 | F2FS file system; i386 support removed | Canonical provided extended support until August 2014. Named Unicycling Gorilla; 3.8.5 was named Displaced Humerus Anterior |
| 3.7 | 10 December 2012 | 3.7.10 | Greg Kroah-Hartman | March 2013 | ARM64 support | Named Terrified Chipmunk |
| 3.6 | 30 September 2012 | 3.6.11 | Greg Kroah-Hartman | December 2012 | Initial support of send/receive and sub-volume quotas for Btrfs | Named Terrified Chipmunk |
| 3.5 | 21 July 2012 | 3.5.7 | Greg Kroah-Hartman | October 2012 | | Canonical provided extended support until April 2014. |
| 3.4 | 20 May 2012 | 3.4.113 | Li Zefan (formerly Greg Kroah-Hartman) | October 2016 | | 9th LTS release |
| 3.3 | 18 March 2012 | 3.3.8 | Greg Kroah-Hartman | June 2012 | | |
| 3.2 | 4 January 2012 | 3.2.102 | Ben Hutchings | May 2018 | | 8th LTS release, used in Ubuntu 12.04 LTS and optionally in 12.04 ESM, Debian 7 "Wheezy" and Slackware 14.0. Canonical promised to (at least) provide long-term support until April 2017; Support has continued for months after. 3.2 to 3.5 was named Saber-toothed Squirrel |
| 3.1 | 24 October 2011 | 3.1.10 | Greg Kroah-Hartman | January 2012 | | 3.1 provided the base for real-time tree. 3.1-rc2 was named Wet Seal; 3.1 was named Divemaster Edition (Linus' diving activities) |
| 3.0 | 21 July 2011 | 3.0.101 | Greg Kroah-Hartman | October 2013 | Btrfs: automatic defragmentation and scrubbing support | 7th LTS release Named Sneaky Weasel |
Legend: Unsupported

== Releases 2.6.x.y ==
Versions 2.6.16 and 2.6.27 of the Linux kernel were unofficially given long-term support (LTS), before a 2011 working group in the Linux Foundation started a formal long-term support initiative.

| Version | Original release date | Last release | Maintainer | EOL | Prominent features | Notes |
|---|---|---|---|---|---|---|
| 2.6.39 | 18 May 2011 | 2.6.39.4 | Greg Kroah-Hartman | August 2011 | | Last stable release of the 2.6 kernel series |
| 2.6.38 | 14 March 2011 | 2.6.38.8 | Greg Kroah-Hartman | June 2011 | | Named Flesh-Eating Bats with Fangs |
| 2.6.37 | 4 January 2011 | 2.6.37.6 | Greg Kroah-Hartman | March 2011 | | Named Flesh-Eating Bats with Fangs |
| 2.6.36 | 20 October 2010 | 2.6.36.4 | Greg Kroah-Hartman | February 2011 | AppArmor security module | Named Flesh-Eating Bats with Fangs |
| 2.6.35 | 1 August 2010 | 2.6.35.14 | Andi Kleen | March 2012 | | 6th LTS release 2.6.35.7 was named Yokohama |
| 2.6.34 | 16 May 2010 | 2.6.34.15 | Paul Gortmaker | February 2014 | | 5th LTS release It was named Sheep on Meth |
| 2.6.33 | 24 February 2010 | 2.6.33.20 | Greg Kroah-Hartman | November 2011 | nouveau driver | 4th LTS release. It was the base for real-time-tree, replaced by 3.0.x. |
| 2.6.32 | 2 December 2009 | 2.6.32.71 | Willy Tarreau (formerly Greg Kroah-Hartman) | March 2016 | Kernel same-page merging (KSM) | 3rd LTS release, used in Debian 6 Squeeze. Canonical also provided support until April 2015. RHEL 6.x |
| 2.6.31 | 9 September 2009 | 2.6.31.14 | Greg Kroah-Hartman | July 2010 | USB 3.0 support | |
| 2.6.30 | 9 June 2009 | 2.6.30.10 | Greg Kroah-Hartman | December 2009 | Tomoyo Linux security module | 2.6.30-rc4–2.6.30-rc6 was named Vindictive Armadillo; Releases between 2.6 and 2.9 were named 2.Man-Eating Seals of Antiquity |
| 2.6.29 | 23 March 2009 | 2.6.29.6 | Greg Kroah-Hartman | July 2009 | Btrfs support | Named Temporary Tasmanian Devil |
| 2.6.28 | 24 December 2008 | 2.6.28.10 | Greg Kroah-Hartman | May 2009 | ext4 stable support | 2.6.28-rc1–2.6.28-rc6 was named Killer Bat of Doom 2.6.28 was named Erotic Pickled Herring |
| 2.6.27 | 9 October 2008 | 2.6.27.62 | Willy Tarreau (formerly Adrian Bunk, and formerly Greg Kroah-Hartman) | March 2012 | | 2nd LTS release 2.6.27.3 was named Trembling Tortoise |
| 2.6.26 | 13 July 2008 | 2.6.26.8 | Greg Kroah-Hartman | November 2008 | | 2.6.26–2.6.27 was named Rotary Wombat |
| 2.6.25 | 16 April 2008 | 2.6.25.20 | Greg Kroah-Hartman | November 2008 | Smack Linux security module | Named Funky Weasel is Jiggy wit it |
| 2.6.24 | 24 January 2008 | 2.6.24.7 | Greg Kroah-Hartman | May 2008 | cgroups support | 2.6.23-rc4–2.6.23-rc6 was named Pink Farting Weasel 2.6.23-rc7–2.6.23–2.6.24 was named Arr Matey! A Hairy Bilge Rat! (TLAPD 2007); 2.6.24.1 was named Err Metey! A Heury Beelge-a Ret! |
| 2.6.23 | 9 October 2007 | 2.6.23.17 | Greg Kroah-Hartman | February 2008 | CFS process scheduler | 2.6.23-rc4–2.6.23-rc6 was named Pink Farting Weasel 2.6.23-rc7–2.6.23–2.6.24 was named Arr Matey! A Hairy Bilge Rat! (TLAPD 2007); 2.6.24.1 was named Err Metey! A Heury Beelge-a Ret! |
| 2.6.22 | 8 July 2007 | 2.6.22.19 | Greg Kroah-Hartman | February 2008 | New 802.11 (Wi-Fi) stack; SLUB memory allocator | 2.6.22-rc3–2.6.22-rc4 was named Jeff Thinks I Should Change This, But To What? 2.6.22-rc5–2.6.22 was named Holy Dancing Manatees, Batman! |
| 2.6.21 | 25 April 2007 | 2.6.21.7 | Greg Kroah-Hartman | August 2007 | GPIO support; Dynticks | Named Nocturnal Monster Puppy |
| 2.6.20 | 4 February 2007 | 2.6.20.21 | Greg Kroah-Hartman | October 2007 | Kernel-based Virtual Machine (KVM) | Named Homicidal Dwarf Hamster |
| 2.6.19 | 29 November 2006 | 2.6.19.7 | Greg Kroah-Hartman | March 2007 | AHCI support; GFS2 | Named Avast! A bilge rat! (TLAPD 2006) |
| 2.6.18 | 20 September 2006 | 2.6.18.8 | Greg Kroah-Hartman | February 2007 2.6.18: RHEL 5.x | NCQ and SATA hotplug support | Named Avast! A bilge rat! (TLAPD 2006) |
| 2.6.17 | 17 June 2006 | 2.6.17.14 | Greg Kroah-Hartman | October 2006 | splice() | 2.6.17-rc5 was named Lordi Rules (Eurovision 2006 winners) 2.6.17-rc6–2.6.17 was named Crazed Snow-Weasel |
| 2.6.16 | 20 March 2006 | 2.6.16.62 | Adrian Bunk (formerly Greg Kroah-Hartman) | July 2008 | OCFS2 support; SLOB memory allocator | 1st LTS release 2.6.16.28-rc2 was named Stable Penguin |
| 2.6.15 | 2 January 2006 | 2.6.15.7 | Greg Kroah-Hartman | March 2006 | S.M.A.R.T. support | Named Sliding Snow Leopard |
| 2.6.14 | 27 October 2005 | 2.6.14.7 | Greg Kroah-Hartman | January 2006 | FUSE support | Named Affluent Albatross |
| 2.6.13 | 28 August 2005 | 2.6.13.5 | Greg Kroah-Hartman | December 2005 | initramfs | Named Woozy Numbat The 2.6.12 release was the first one managed by Git. |
| 2.6.12 | 18 June 2005 | 2.6.12.6 | Greg Kroah-Hartman | August 2005 | | Named Woozy Numbat The 2.6.12 release was the first one managed by Git. |
| 2.6.11 | 2 March 2005 | 2.6.11.12 | Greg Kroah-Hartman | June 2005 | | Named Woozy Numbat The 2.6.12 release was the first one managed by Git. |
| 2.6.10 | 24 December 2004 | | | | Switchable and modular I/O schedulers | |
| 2.6.9 | 18 October 2004 | | | | | |
| 2.6.8 | 14 August 2004 | | | | | |
| 2.6.7 | 16 June 2004 | | | | | |
| 2.6.6 | 10 May 2004 | | | | CFQ I/O scheduler; Laptop mode | |
| 2.6.5 | 4 April 2004 | | | | Adaptive lazy readahead | |
| 2.6.4 | 11 March 2004 | | | | Intel x86-64 support; ARMv6 support; Virtual console UTF-8 mode support | |
| 2.6.3 | 18 February 2004 | | | | Power Mac G5 support | |
| 2.6.2 | 4 February 2004 | | | | RAID 6 support | |
| 2.6.1 | 9 January 2004 | | | | EFI support | |
| 2.6 | 17 December 2003 | | Linus Torvalds | December 2004 | O(1) scheduler; Preemption (2.5.4); Advanced Linux Sound Architecture (ALSA); SELinux security module | 2.6.2–2.6.4 was named Feisty Dunnart; 2.6.5–2.6.9 was named Zonked Quokka 2.6.9: RHEL 4.x The 2.5 kernels were development kernels |
Legend: Unsupported

== Releases before 2.6.0 ==
| Version | Original release date | Last release | Maintainer | EOL | Prominent features | Notes |
|---|---|---|---|---|---|---|
| 2.4 | 4 January 2001 | 2.4.37.11 | Willy Tarreau (formerly Marcelo Tosatti) | December 2011 | JFS support (2.4.24); XFS support (2.4.20); ext3 support (2.4.15); ReiserFS support (2.4.1); tmpfs support; GFS support; Netfilter (2.3.15) | The 2.3 kernels were development kernels 2.4.9: RHEL 2.1; 2.4.10: Featured a complete rewrite of the Virtual Memory Management (VMM) subsystem. 2.4.21: RHEL 3.x |
| 2.2 | 26 January 1999 | 2.2.26 | Marc-Christian Petersen (formerly Alan Cox) | Made unofficially obsolete with the 2.2.27-rc2 | USB devices support; Frame-buffer console; ipchains; Video4Linux; NTFS (readonly), FAT32 and HFS support; Initial IPv6 support; SPX support; Loop device support; Scheduling classes and scheduler SMP support; SLAB memory allocator | The 2.1 kernels were development kernels |
| 2.0 | 9 June 1996 | 2.0.40 | David Weinehall | officially made obsolete with the kernel 2.2.0 release | Symmetric multiprocessing (SMP) support | Larry Ewing created the Tux mascot in 1996 |
| 1.3 | 12 June 1995 | 1.3.100 | Linus Torvalds | EOL | /dev/random; watchdog timer; Automatic modules loading; initrd boot support; bzImage support | Greased Weasel |
| 1.2 | 7 March 1995 | 1.2.13 | Linus Torvalds | EOL | Round-robin scheduling | Linux '95 |
| 1.1 | 6 April 1994 | 1.1.95 | Linus Torvalds | EOL | ipfw; Dual IDE interface support; ATAPI CD-ROM support | |
| 1.0 | 14 March 1994 | 1.0.9 | Linus Torvalds | EOL | Open Sound System (OSS); NTP support | |
| 0.99 | 13 December 1992 | 0.99.15j | Linus Torvalds | EOL | Xiafs support; ext2 support; NFS support; kmalloc | The Linux 0.99 tar.bz2 archive grew from 426 kB to 1009 kB on the way to 1.0. |
| 0.98 | 29 September 1992 | 0.98.6 | Linus Torvalds | EOL | TCP/IP support; SCSI tape support; ISO 9660 support | |
| 0.97 | 1 August 1992 | 0.97.6 | Linus Torvalds | EOL | Initial procfs; PS/2 mouse support; Microsoft bus mouse support; SCSI CD-ROM support | |
| 0.96 | 22 May 1992 | 0.96c.2 | Linus Torvalds | EOL | ext support (0.96c); FAT16 support; Shared libraries; Logitech bus mouse support | |
| 0.95 | 8 March 1992 | 0.95c+ | Linus Torvalds | EOL | Login prompt; Initial parallel port printer support; Initial reboot support | Jump from 0.12 to 0.95 First version released under the GPL. Although the license change took effect as of the first of February 1992. |
| 0.12 | 15 January 1992 | | Linus Torvalds | EOL | Job control; Virtual consoles; pty; Symbolic links; Virtual memory | |
| 0.11 | 8 December 1991 | | Linus Torvalds | EOL | Demand-loading from disk; CGA, MGA and EGA support; malloc | First kernel where other people start making real contributions |
| 0.10 | November 1991 | | Linus Torvalds | EOL | Initial floppy driver support; Supports up to 16MB RAM | Jump from 0.03 to 0.10 First release where Minix isn't needed anymore |
| 0.03 | October 1991 | | Linus Torvalds | EOL | Multithreaded filesystem | |
| 0.02 | 5 October 1991 | | Linus Torvalds | EOL | US keyboard support | First "usable" release; for wider distribution |
| 0.01 | 17 September 1991 | | Linus Torvalds | EOL | i386 support; PATA support; Minix support; VGA text mode; Hardcoded Finnish keyboard; Supports up to 8MB RAM | |
Legend: Unsupported

== See also ==
- Linux adoption
- Linux kernel
- History of Linux
- Timeline of free and open-source software
