= Slab =

Slab or SLAB may refer to:

== Physical materials ==
- Concrete slab, a flat concrete plate used in construction
- Stone slab, a flat stone used in construction
- Slab (casting), a length of metal
- Slab (geology), that portion of a tectonic plate that is subducting
  - Slab pull, the tectonic plate force due to subduction
  - Slab suction, one of the major plate tectonic driving forces
  - Slab window, a gap that forms in a subducted oceanic plate
  - Slab (fossil) and counter slab, the two counterparts of a fossil impression
- Slab (sawmilling), the outer piece cut from a log when it is squared or sawn into boards
  - Slab hut, a kind of dwelling made from slabs of split or sawn timber

== Places ==
- Slab Point, a rocky point in the South Shetland Islands, Antarctica

=== United States ===
- Slab, West Virginia, an unincorporated community in Ritchie County, West Virginia
- Slab City, California, a locality in the Colorado Desert
- Slab City, Wisconsin, an unincorporated community in Shawano County, Wisconsin
- Slab Fork, a tributary of the Guyandotte River in southern West Virginia

== People and characters ==
- Thomas Murphy (Irish republican) (born 1946), nicknamed "Slab"

=== Fictional characters ===
- Slab (comics), a fictional character in the Marvel Comics Universe
- Slab, a character in The Ripping Friends
- Slab, a character in "Mr. Young"

== Media and entertainment ==
- SLAB!, 1980s industrial music group
- "The Slab", a 1984 song by Hunters & Collectors off the album The Jaws of Life
- The Slab, a 2004 UK poetry anthology
- The Slab or Slabside Penitentiary, a metahuman prison in the DC Comics universe

== Science and technology ==
- Slab (geometry), the volume between two parallel planes
- Stupendously large black hole, a hypothetical region of spacetime

=== Technology ===
- Slab (unit), a 12-bit unit of computer memory on the NCR 315
- Slab allocation, a computer memory management mechanism
- Bar (form), a mobile phone form factor also known as a slab
- Slab method, a ray-box intersection algorithm
- Slab serif, a kind of typeface
- Slab construction, a building method

== Organisations ==
- Scottish Legal Aid Board
- Silicon Laboratories (NASDAQ symbol)

== Other uses ==
- Slab, unseparated ribs in a culinary context
- Slab of beer, a flat package containing a large number of cans of beer
- Coin slab, a sealed transparent plastic coin holder
- Slab of Bacon, a traveling trophy in American college football rivalry games
- Slab climbing, a type of rock climbing on a surface at an angle less steep than vertical
- Student loan asset-backed security, an asset-backed security
- "S.L.A.B. theory", a term coined by David Bordwell to refer to theories that use the ideas of Saussure, Lacan, Althusser, and/or Barthes
- "Slab", a disc golf distance driver by Infinite Discs
- Slab (car), a slang name to heavily customized and colorful cars associated with Texan rap culture
