= Slub =

Slub or SLUB may refer to:

- Ślub, a play by Polish writer Witold Gombrowicz
- Slub (band), a computer music group formed in 2000
- Slub (in textiles), a thick spot in a fiber
  - Slub (knitting), a thick spot in a yarn created by varying the tightness of the twist
- Saxon State Library, in Dresden, Germany
- SLUB (software), one of the three memory handlers in the Linux kernel
- Sľub, a Slovak period family television series which being broadcast on TV Markíza

== See also ==
- Slab (disambiguation)
- SLOB
- Stub (disambiguation)
