= AZ64 =

Data compression algorithm proprietary to Amazon Web Services

AZ64 or AZ64 Encoding is a data compression algorithm proprietary to Amazon Web Services.

Amazon claims better compression and better speed than raw, LZO or Zstandard, when used in Amazon's Redshift service.
