= Elrad =

Elrad may refer to:

- Earth-Limb Radiance Experiment, a secondary payload of the 26th Space Shuttle mission, STS-26
- elrad (magazine), a discontinued semi-professional electronic magazine in Germany
- Long Range Acoustic Device or "LRAD" (pronounced "el-rad")
