= Elrad (magazine) =

elrad
- Categories: Computer magazines
- Frequency: Monthly
- First issue: November 1977
- Final issue: August 1998
- Company: Heinz Heise (1977–1997); Bruchmann Verlag (1997–1998)
- Country: Germany
- Based in: Hannover
- Language: German

Elrad – Magazin für Elektronik und technische Rechneranwendung (Magazine for electronics and technical applied computing) was a popular German computer magazine for a semi-professional audience, published by the Heinz Heise publishing house in Hannover from November 1977 to June 1997.

In 1983, one of elrad's supplements, computing today, was separated into an own publication, the now popular magazine c't. In 1992, elrad swallowed the German magazine Der Elektroniker which then ceased to exist as a separate entity.

The name rights and subscription base were sold to Bruchmann Verlag in 1997 who continued to publish the magazine from July 1997 until their bankruptcy in 1998. The last issue under new ownership was published in August 1998. In 2005, Heise published an archive DVD with facsimiles of all issues published under its ownership.
