= Geizhals =

Comparison shopping website

- Website type: E-commerce
- Available in: English and German
- Founded: 1996
- Headquarters: Vienna, Austria
- Owners: Preisvergleich Internet Services AG, Vienna, Austria (part of Heise group)
- Founder: Marinos J. Yannikos
- Industry: Internet
- Products: 2.4 million products (mostly hardware)
- Services: Comparison shopping website
- Revenue: € 14.2 million
- Operating income: € 1.5 billion
- Website: geizhals.eu, geizhals.at, geizhals.de, cenowarka.pl
- Launched: 1996; 30 years ago

Geizhals, known in English as Skinflint Price Comparison, is a feature and price comparison website, focusing on, but not limited to, the German-speaking area. The product filters are managed by an editorial board. For notebooks it has 150 filters, and offers for the most common products more than 100 different sellers for the identical product.

== Scope ==
=== Usage ===
The database of products is set up by editorial members. Consumers can find hardware (e.g. notebooks, smartphones, cables, printers), software, electronics, household appliances, sports goods, and drugstore wares. It offers filtering for technical features, such as number and version of USB-ports or version of the operating system, specification sheets, test reports, product ratings, price historiy, warehouse stock, shipping costs and rating of the traders. Geizhals is an intermediary between consumer and traders, helping consumers find products and vendors for it.

=== Importance ===
Geizhals is an Austrian company focusing on the Austrian, German, British and Polish customers. Geizhals.at has monthly about 3.5 million unique clients, 2.4 million products, 280000 traders. Geizhals.at together with Geizhals.de has 12 Mio. visitors. In July 2019 Geizhals.at was on the 41 Position in the Austrian Alexa Rank. Alongside Herold (white pages and yellow pages) and GMX (Mail) – Geizhals is one of the most commonly visited Austrian service providers, and is the marked-leader for price-comparisons in Austria.

== History ==
Geizhals was founded in 1997 by Marinos J. Yannikos, who was a scientist at TU Wien, under the name Hardware-Preisvergleich and focussed on traders around Vienna. Since 2005 Geizhals has a cooperation with heise, and in 2013 and 2014, Heinz Heise bought 75% of Internet Services AG shares, and since June 2021 it has indirect 100% of the shares.

Since June 1999 Geizhals provides price comparisons over the website geizhals.at, and is a trademark since 2001. Preisvergleich Internet Services AG was founded in June 2000 together with e-Matrix Online Business Development AG. Preisvergleich Internet Services AG bought 30% of compera.at, a Gas-, Energy and Internet-comparison-website. In 2003 Geizhals wanted to acquire geizhals.de, which was owned by another site, gaining an unknown seven-figure price. In 2012 Geizhals bought Geizhals.de, which belonged to a competitor. In 2009 Geizhals extended to the British market and created skinflint.co.uk, and one year later Geizhals started developing the Polish branch cenowarka.pl. Since August 2013 Heise manages the marketing of Geizhals.de. In 2021 Geizhals incurred, for assumed 5 Mio€. , Tarife.at, a website for comparing tariffs of 35 different phone-companies for Austrian mobile-phone-number, conveying 50000 customers per month to companies. Tarife.at was founded in 2010 by, at that time 18 year old, Maximilian Schirmer, who is committed to the website for at least 5 years and also the Trademark "Tarife.at" should be kept.

=== WIPO ===
In June 2005 WIPO decided the request of Geizhals gaining geizhals.com, however since 2018 geizhals.com redirects to https://geizhals.eu/, which is owned by Geizhals.

=== metashop.at ===
2004 a cooperation of the Austrian Economic Chamber with Geizhals offer metashop.at. metashop.at is a rented-online-shop-system and should give traders an easy possibility to online-trading.

=== ISP-Comparison ===
From 2002 to 2017 Geizhals offered a comparison for the yearly costs of internet provides (including modem/router,...).

== Features and services ==
An editorial board feeds the product database with product-features, data sheets, price histories, price alarms, shipping times and more. Geizhals offers filters relating time since marked launch.

=== Geizhals-Forum ===
Geizhals manages a Forum since 2000, which can be used for problems with products and traders. In 2019 the gossip-channel was closed, due to provocations & insults.

=== Cooperations ===
Geizhals has Cooperations with Heise online, ComputerBase, PC Games Hardware, Computec Media und winfuture.de, allowing them to embed Geizhals in their websites

=== Mobile app ===
Since 2011 Geizhals offers a mobile app for Android and iOS. It has features such as Barcode-Scan, to find the cheapest offer or finding the route to the nearest offer, which are not available for the Browser-version.

=== Revenue ===
Traders pay either by (i) Pay-by-click, paying for every user visiting the website from Geizhals, or by (ii) Pay-by-order, paying for every sale.

Geizhals also gets money by advertisements, however this income is inferior.

== Critics ==
According to Format Geizhals leaded in Austria to a "price war", that troubles big companies, and lead 2013, according to Format, to insolvency of Niedermeyer, an Austrian electronics trader with a revenue of more than 100 Million per year. Because of the price drop, he faced hatred from the industry. However, according to the founder Marinos Yannikos, his only interest was to find for himself a way to save money and time, and did not wanted to withhold it to others.

=== bepixelung.org ===
Manufacturers exerted price-pressure on traders. Some manufacturers provoked Geizhals with withdrawing product-image-rights. In autumn 2008, therefore Geizhals established bepixelung.org for Users sharing their own product-photos, however in August 2017 the website is closed and is now used by someone else.
