= ComputerBase =

German online magazine

- Website type: IT online magazine
- Available in: German
- Website: www.computerbase.de
- Commercial: Yes
- Current status: Active

ComputerBase is a German IT online magazine.

== History ==
ComputerBase GmbH (based in Berlin) had previously been marketed by AOL Advertising before moving to FreeXmedia amid the winding down of AOL's German ad-sales operation.

In 2008, the German web-traffic audit IVW reported that ComputerBase was listed among major online sites with 21.65 million page impressions.

In April 2010, W&V reported that FreeXmedia, an online advertising sales house of the Freenet AG, expanded its IT-channel portfolio by adding the websites WinFuture.de and ComputerBase.de. The report also cited figures of 1.08 million unique users for ComputerBase.

== See also ==
- Geizhals
