= SoftRAM =

PC software products

SoftRAM and SoftRAM95
- Developer: Syncronys Softcorp
- Stable release: 1995 / August 1995
- Operating system: Microsoft Windows
- Type: System software
- License: Proprietary
- Website: syncronys.com at the Wayback Machine (archived December 28, 1996)

SoftRAM and SoftRAM95 were system software products released by Syncronys Softcorp in the mid-1990s that claimed to increase or even double the available random-access memory in Microsoft Windows without the need for a hardware upgrade, which is possible using memory compression. However, it was later discovered that the SoftRAM95 program utilized only a stub compression function that was incomplete.

In July 1996, Syncronys Softcorp agreed to settle charges by the Federal Trade Commission that the company "misrepresented and/or failed to substantiate the performance" of the products, although the agreement stipulated it "did not constitute an admission of a law violation." As part of the settlement, Syncronys Softcorp offered $10 rebates for affected consumers. The majority shareholders of the company in 1996 included its founding CEO, Daniel Taylor (30%), subsequent CEO, Rainer Poertner (14%), and Vice President of Technology Wendell Brown (7%).

In a 1996 interview with Mc magazine, the CEO of Syncronys Softcorp, Rainer Poertner, took responsibility for forcing the software's release despite engineering team objections that the product's development was not yet complete.

In 2006, the product was rated the third "Worst Tech Product of All Time" by PC World behind AOL and RealPlayer (1999 version). Around 100,000 copies of SoftRAM and 600,000 copies of SoftRAM95 were sold overall.

== Versions ==
=== SoftRAM ===
SoftRAM was designed for use with Windows 3.1. It was launched in March 1995 and sold more than 100,000 copies.

Most out-of-memory errors in Windows 3.x were caused by the first megabyte of memory in a computer, the conventional memory, becoming full. Windows needed to allocate a Program Segment Prefix (PSP) in this area of memory for each program started. Some utilities prevented DLLs from allocating memory here, leaving more space for user programs. This was a standard technique also used by other memory optimization tools. SoftRAM also claimed to increase the amount of virtual memory available by compressing the pages of virtual memory stored in the swap file on the hard disk, which has the added effect of reducing the number of swap file reads and writes. The software also increased the size of the Windows page file, something achievable by users who are aware of how to change relevant system settings, without the cost of additional software.

=== SoftRAM95 ===
SoftRAM95 was designed for Windows 95 and was released in August 1995, selling more than 600,000 units. Its list price was USD $30.

When Windows 95 was launched, it was widely reported that software for the operating system would be "memory hungry," requiring at least 4 megabytes of memory and preferably 8 megabytes. Syncronys positioned SoftRAM95 as a cheaper alternative to buying more memory for those users who would otherwise be unable to run Windows 95.

== FTC investigation ==
In December 1995, the German computing magazine c't disassembled the program and reported it didn't do what was claimed in advertisements. Instead, data reportedly passed through the VxD unaltered with no compression, and the actual drivers were slightly modified versions of sample code from Microsoft's "Windows Development Kit". Still, the program purported to increase system resources by silently increasing the size of the swap file on Windows 3.1 and misrepresenting the current state of the system, leading the magazine to rate it as "placebo software." It was also reportedly compiled with the debug flag on, so it ran slower than the original driver from Microsoft. Another test by PC Magazine revealed SoftRAM95 took the same amount of time to move through systems that contained varying amounts of RAM. A later analysis by Dr. Dobb's Journal concluded the same.

The Federal Trade Commission began an investigation in late 1995, ultimately asserting that Syncronys' claims about SoftRAM95 were "false and misleading" and that "SoftRAM95 does not increase RAM in a computer using Windows 95; nor does the product enhance the speed, capacity, or other performance measures of a computer using Windows 95". This prompted the company to recall SoftRAM95 from the market in December 1995. Several individual customers filed suit against the company as well. When Syncronys settled with the FTC in July 1996, it agreed to offer a US$10 rebate to customers who requested it.

== Bankruptcy ==
Syncronys filed for bankruptcy in July 1998 with $4.5 million of debt after releasing a dozen other poorly received tools. The company's final release, UpgradeAID 98, claimed to allow users to downgrade from Windows 98 to Windows 95, duplicating an existing feature of Windows 98 for $39.95 (equivalent to $79 in 2026 dollars). A large number of its creditors were customers who had not received their rebates for SoftRAM.

Syncronys replaced its board and leadership and operated under Chapter 7 bankruptcy until 2002. In 2006, the SEC revoked its securities and placed Syncronys in default for failing to file any financial reports since their 1998 Chapter 11 bankruptcy event.
