= C't =

German computer magazine

c’t – Magazin für Computertechnik

- Cover of 15 November 2024 issue
- Categories: Computer magazines
- Frequency: Biweekly
- Circulation: 321,000 / issue
- First issue: November/December 1983
- Company: Heinz Heise
- Country: Germany
- Language: German; Dutch
- Website: www.heise.de/ct/
- ISSN: 0724-8679

c't – Magazin für Computertechnik (German pronunciation: [tseːˈteː]; Magazine for Computer Technology) is a biweekly German computer magazine, published by the Heinz Heise publishing house of Hanover.

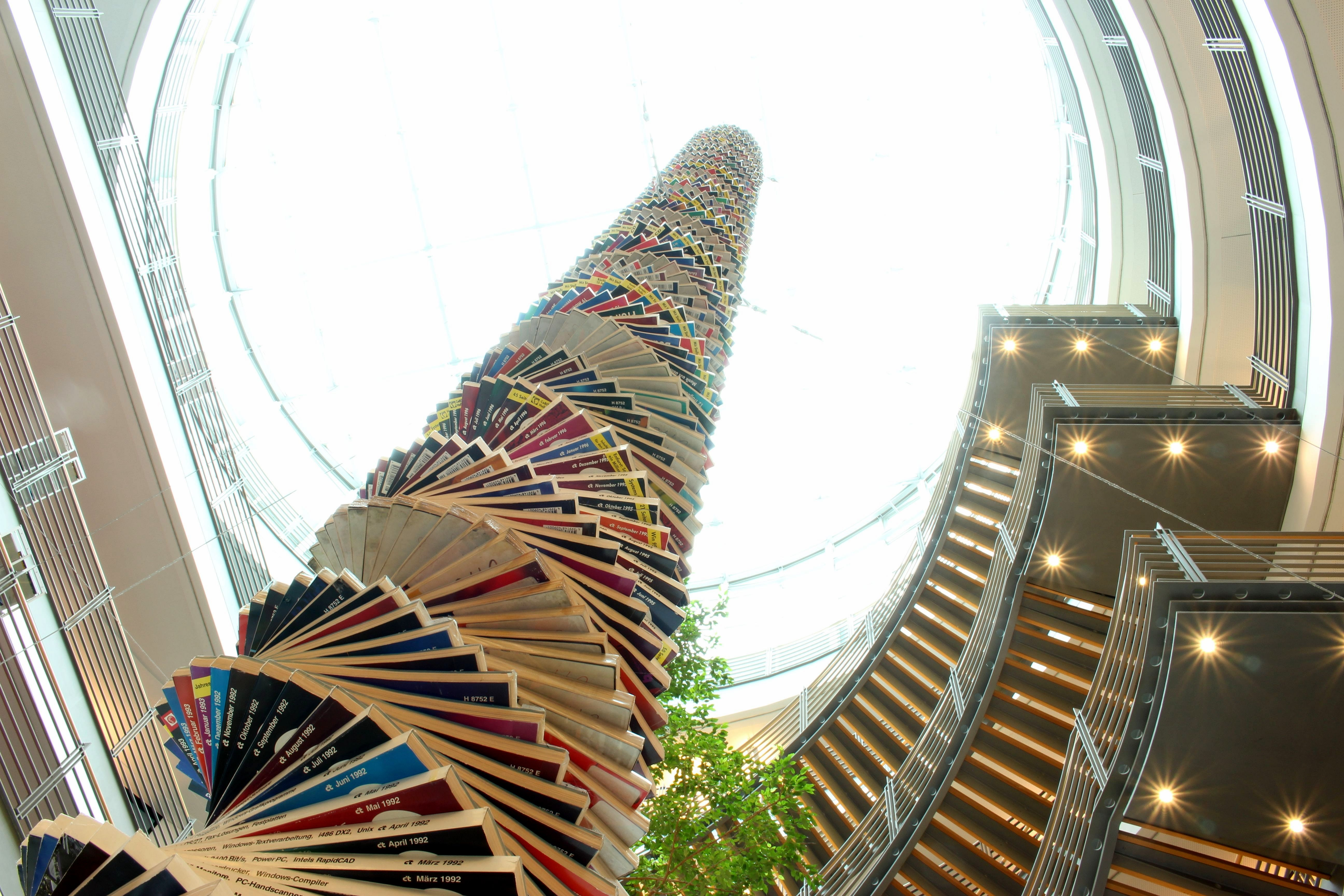
The 5.71 meter high tower from the 587 published c't editions up to the 30th anniversary has been in the foyer of the publishing house since October 2013.

== History and profile ==
The first issue of the magazine was the November/December 1983 edition. Originally a special section of the electronics magazine elrad, the magazine has been published monthly since December 1983 and biweekly since October 1997. A Dutch edition also exists which is published monthly. In addition, since 2008 a Russian licensed-title version named c’t – Журнал о компьютерной технике is published in Moscow.

The magazine is the second most popular German-language computer magazine with a circulation of about 315,000 (as of March 2011; printed circulation: 419,000). With 241,000 subscriptions it is the computer magazine with the most subscribers in Europe.

c't covers both hardware and software; it focuses on software for the Microsoft Windows platform, but Linux and Apple are also regularly featured. The magazine has a reputation of being thorough, although critics claim that the magazine has been "dumbed down" in recent years to accommodate the mass market.

One of the numerous projects c't initiated is the WSUS Offline Update, a set of scripts to download Microsoft updates, combine it with an install script, and create a CD image. With Offline Update burned to a CD or DVD, a technician can update Windows 2000/XP/Vista and Microsoft Office 2003/2007 without an Internet connection. This is especially useful for people with no or slow Internet connections, or not exposing a vulnerable system to the Internet.

A sister magazine, iX, focuses on topics for IT professionals.

== Popularity ==
c't became widely known in 1995 when it rated the program SoftRAM95 "Placebo-Software" in a limited test. When the German distributor of the program took legal action to prohibit this rating, c't followed up with a more extensive test showing the product had virtually no effect other than giving misleading data about system statistics. Subsequent media coverage led to SoftRAM95 being removed from the German and US markets. In a 1996 interview, Rainer Poertner, the German-born CEO of Syncronys Softcorp which released SoftRAM95, took responsibility for forcing the product's release before its development was complete.
