= IX (magazine) =

German computer magazine

iX is a German monthly computer magazine, published by the Heise Verlag publishing house since 1988. The magazine focuses primarily on professional IT. Within this area it deals with a broad range of issues, ranging from various programming topics, server hardware reviews and virtualization, computer security to articles about emerging technologies and current IT related legal or political issues. The magazine is headquartered in Hannover.

It has an older sister magazine, c't, which covers general computer technology.

The magazine had a sold circulation of about 51,000 (Q3/2008; printed circulation: 72,000)..
