= Slab City, Wisconsin =

- Unincorporated community
- Interactive map of Slab City, Wisconsin
- Coordinates: 44.72028°N 88.44556°W
- Country: United States
- State: Wisconsin
- County: Shawano
- Established: 1800's

Area
  - Total: 1.5 sq mi (3.9 km^{2})
  - Land: 1.3 sq mi (3.4 km^{2})
  - Water: 0.2 sq mi (0.52 km^{2})
- Elevation: 784 ft (239 m)

Population
  - Total: 120 (estimated)
- Time zone: UTC-6 (Central (CST))
  - Summer (DST): UTC-5 (CDT)

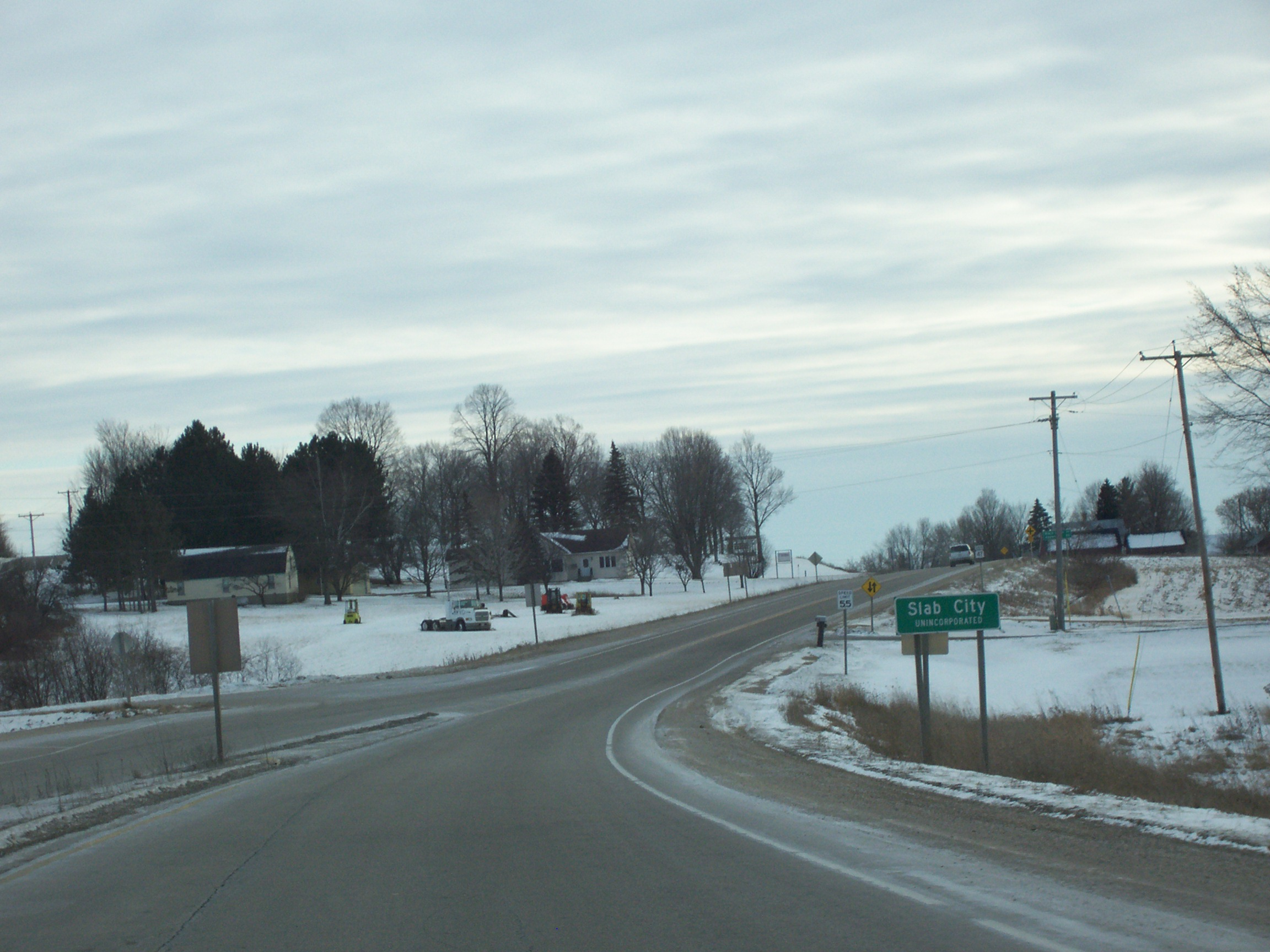
Sign for Slab City while traveling south on Wisconsin Highway 47

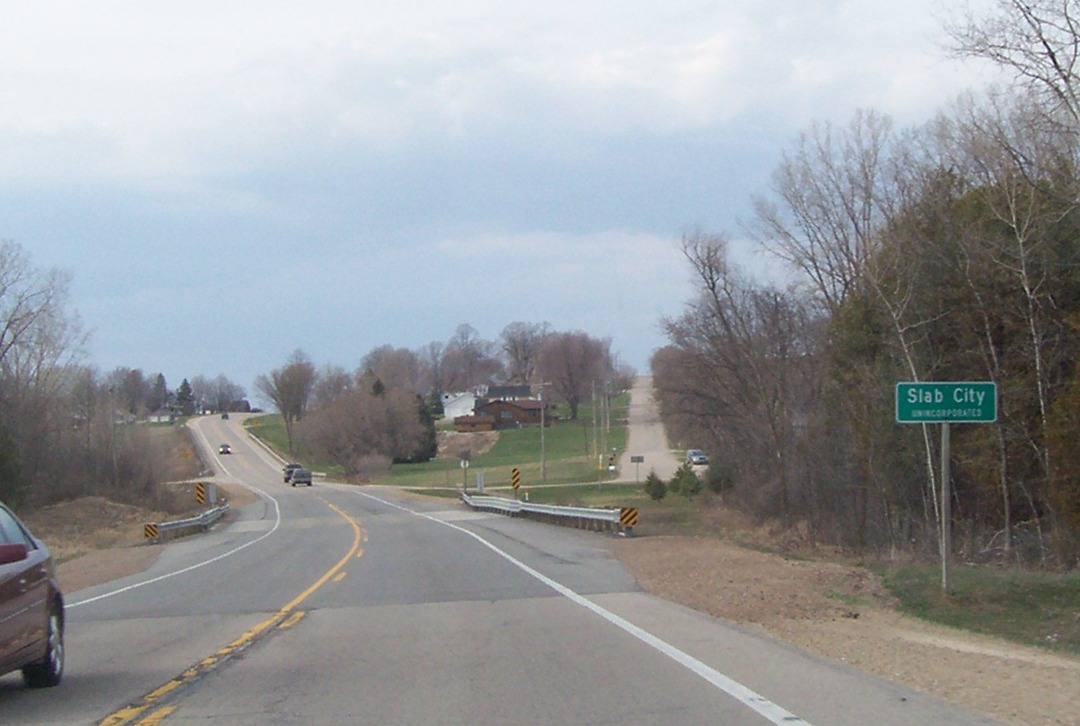
Looking north at Slab City on WIS 47

Slab City is an unincorporated community in Shawano County, Wisconsin, United States, in the town of Hartland. It is located one mile south of Bonduel, on Wisconsin Highway 47.

== Transportation ==
Wisconsin State Highways 29 and 47 run through Slab City, and provide access to both north-south (Wisconsin State Highway 47) and east-west (Wisconsin State Highway 29) trade routes that span the entire state. The community is well connected to large cities, such as Appleton along Hwy 47 and Green Bay along Hwy 29.

An old alignment of State Highway 47 ran more centrally through the community. The route of the highway was changed on the weekend of October 1, 1950 to run alongside the hill Slab City is situated upon, rather than over it. The old road, which is to say Slab City's original main road, still has many of the community's population living along it, and is called "Old 47".

== Economy ==
From 1995 to 2006, the small community was also home to its own microbrewery, called Slab City Brewery, which had a beer named Old 47, after the (former) highway that runs through the center of town and still bears that name.
