= Slab, West Virginia =

Slab
- Unincorporated community
- Location within the state of West Virginia Slab (the United States)
- Coordinates: 39°7′44″N 80°58′35″W
- Country: United States
- State: West Virginia
- County: Ritchie
- Elevation: 761 ft (232 m)
- Time zone: UTC-5 (Eastern (EST))
  - Summer (DST): UTC-4 (EDT)
- GNIS ID: 1555640

Slab is an unincorporated community in Ritchie County, West Virginia, United States.
