= Lempel–Ziv–Oberhumer =

Data compression algorithm

LZO
- Developer: Markus F.X.J. Oberhumer
- Release: May 20, 1996; 30 years ago
- Stable release: 2.10 / March 1, 2017; 9 years ago
- Operating system: Cross-platform
- Type: data compression
- License: GPLv2 or commercial
- Website: www.oberhumer.com/opensource/lzo/

Lempel–Ziv–Oberhumer (LZO) is a lossless data compression algorithm that is focused on decompression speed. lzop is a free software file compression tool which implements the LZO algorithm and is licensed under the GPL. Aimed at being very fast, lzop produces files slightly larger than gzip while only requiring a tenth of the CPU use and only slightly higher memory utilization. lzop is one of the fastest compressors available, a close second to lz4.

== Design ==
The original "lzop" implementation, released in 1996, was developed by Markus Franz Xaver Johannes Oberhumer, based on earlier algorithms by Abraham Lempel and Jacob Ziv. The LZO library implements a number of algorithms with the following characteristics:

- Higher compression speed compared to DEFLATE compression
- Very fast decompression
- Requires an additional buffer during compression (of size 8 kB or 64 kB, depending on compression level)
- Requires no additional memory for decompression other than the source and destination buffers
- Allows the user to adjust the balance between compression ratio and compression speed, without affecting the speed of decompression

LZO supports overlapping compression and in-place decompression. As a block compression algorithm, it compresses and decompresses blocks of data. Block size must be the same for compression and decompression. LZO compresses a block of data into matches (a sliding dictionary) and runs of non-matching literals to produce good results on highly redundant data and deals acceptably with non-compressible data, only expanding incompressible data by a maximum of 1/64 of the original size when measured over a block size of at least 1 kB.

== Implementations ==
The reference implementation is written in ANSI C and has been made available as free software under the GNU General Public License. The copyright for the code is owned by Markus F. X. J. Oberhumer. It was originally published in 1996. Oberhumer has also written a command-line frontend called lzop.

Versions of LZO are available for the Perl, Python and Java languages. Various LZO implementations are reported to work under AIX, Atari TOS (Atari ST), ConvexOS, IRIX, Linux, macOS, Nintendo 64, Palm OS, PlayStation, Solaris, SunOS, VxWorks, Wii, and Win32.

FFmpeg's libavutil library includes its own implementation of LZO as a possible method for lossless video compression. FFmpeg's implementation of the decompressor is also used in OpenConnect in order to support LZO-compressed ESP packets sent by Juniper Networks and Pulse Secure VPN servers. LZO is available in OpenVPN but its use is strongly discouraged after it was found that compressing encrypted VPN connections may allow attackers to gain privileged information by observing message lengths.

The Linux kernel uses its LZO implementation in some of its features:

- btrfs uses LZO as a possible compression method for file system compression.
- initrd and initramfs use LZO as a possible compression method for initial RAM drive compression.
- SquashFS uses LZO as a possible compression method for file system compression.
- zram uses LZO with run-length encoding called LZO-RLE as the default compression method for RAM drive compression.
- zswap uses LZO as the default compression method for virtual memory compression
