= Heise Group =

German media conglomerate

Heise Gruppe GmbH & Co. KG

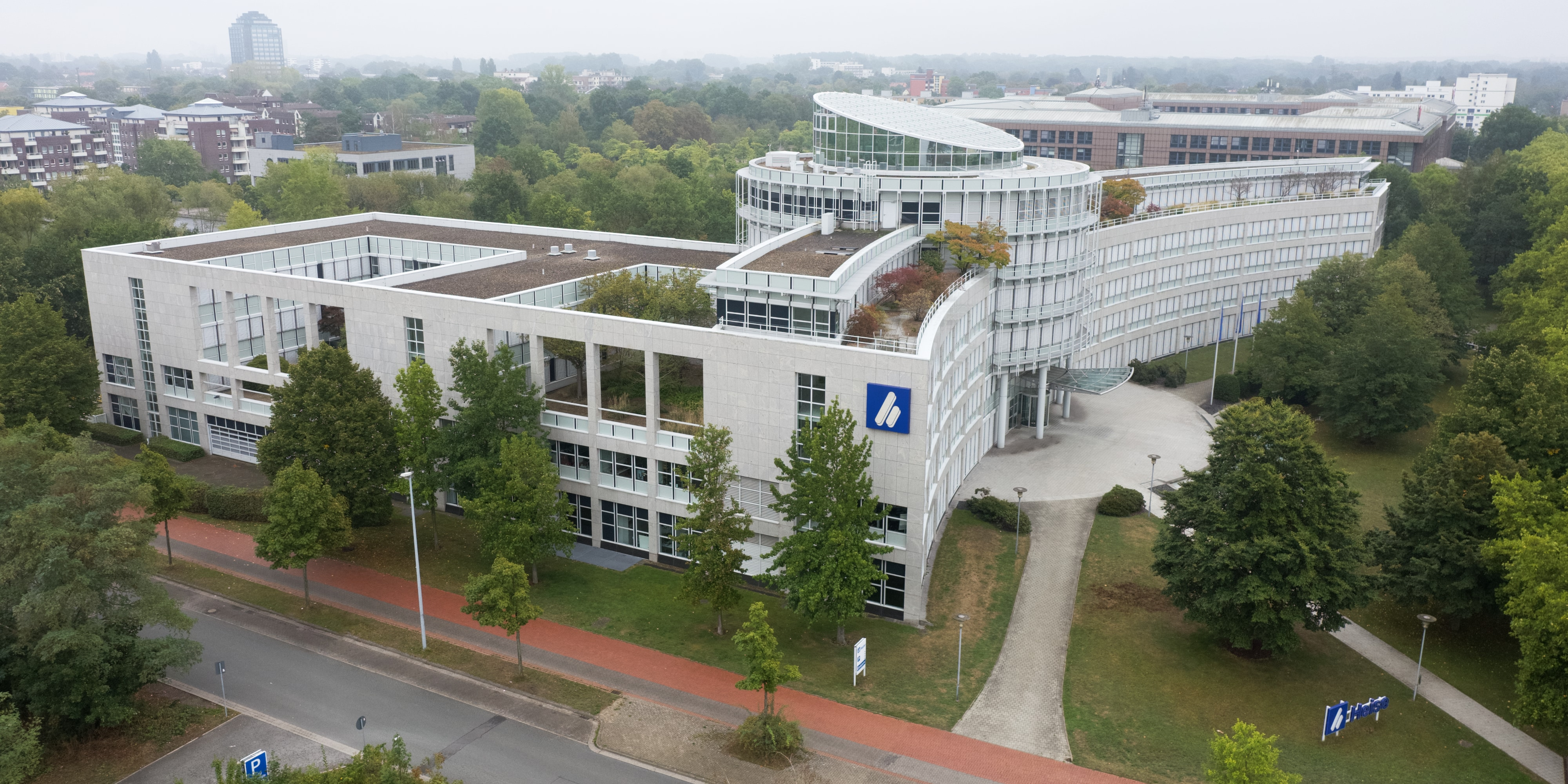
- Type: Private
- Predecessor: Verlag Heinz Heise
- Founded: 1949; 77 years ago in Hanover, Germany
- Founder: Heinz Heise
- Headquarters: Hanover, Germany
- Area served: Germany; Austria; Switzerland
- Key people: Ansgar Heise
- Revenue: €248 million (2024)
- Owner: Heise family
- Number of employees: 1,382 (2024)
- Website: www.heise-gruppe.de

Heise Gruppe GmbH & Co. KG is a German media conglomerate headquartered in Hanover. It was founded in 1949 by Heinz Heise and is still family-owned. Its core business is directory media as well as general-interest and specialist media from the fields of computer technology, information technology and network culture such as c't and heise online. Another focus of its business activities is portals for price and product comparisons and electronics e-commerce.

== History ==
In 1949, Heinz Heise founded the publishing house named after him in Hanover-Badenstedt. The company's first product was an address book for the town of Bünde, later joined by the telephone directory for Einbeck. Gradually, other cities and regions were added to the product range. In addition, Heise expanded the program to include non-fiction topics, such as manuals on law. By 1960, sales had risen to over one million marks.

In 1972, Heinz Heise handed over the management of the company to his son Christian. Under his leadership, a magazine for electronics and technology topics, was created. The first issue of the computer magazine c't appeared in 1983, followed by the professional magazine iX in 1988. Both publications are still around today. Later, the IT sector was further expanded with the acquisition of the Heidelberg-based Dpunkt Verlag.

After the fall of the Berlin Wall, Heise expanded into the states of the former Eastern Bloc. In 1992, the company took over the long-established Hinstorff publishing house in Rostock. Having previously invested in regional radio stations, Heise participated in the founding of Radio 21, a private radio station in Lower Saxony, in year 2000. Additionally, Heise invested in digital business models with partner publishers: Das Örtliche and Das Telefonbuch appeared online for the first time. The news portal heise.de was created and supplemented by Telepolis and other channels. The MIT magazine Technology Review, whose German-language version has been published by Heise since 2003, was widely recognized.

In recent years, price comparison portals have taken on greater importance at Heise. The company has stakes in billiger.de, guenstiger.de and geizhals.at. In 2025, the company took over German electronics online retailer Mindfactory.

== Publications ==
Heise publishes Das Örtliche and Das Telefonbuch as well as the Gelbe Seiten in joint editorial and publishing partnership with Deutsche Tele Medien. The media are published in printed form, as a web application and for mobile devices. In addition to a simple entry, Heise offers small and medium-sized companies a wide range of online marketing services.

The IT news portal heise online (heise.de) is leading in German-speaking countries. It also includes the media brands c't, iX, Make, Mac & i, Technology Review, heise Autos, TechStage and Telepolis. The company uses the brands both online and for magazines, as well as for events, especially congresses, conferences, seminars and workshops, including Heise Academy.
