= The Slab =

Poetry anthology

The Slab is a poetry anthology published in 2004 in the United Kingdom by Muesli Jellyfish. The book features poets of varying notability. Authors published in this book include Dan Fante, Geoff Hattersley and Victoria J. Smith.
