= LZ4 (compression algorithm) =

Lossless compression algorithm

- Original author: Yann Collet
- Developer: Yann Collet
- Release: 24 April 2011
- Stable release: 1.10.0 / 22 July 2024; 2 years ago
- Written in: C
- Operating system: Cross-platform
- Platform: Portable
- Type: Data compression
- License: Simplified BSD License
- Website: lz4.org
- Repository: github.com/lz4/lz4

LZ4 Frame Format
- Magic number: 04 22 4D 18 (new); 02 21 4C 18 (legacy)
- Type of format: Data compression
- Website: https://github.com/lz4/lz4/blob/master/doc/lz4_Frame_format.md

LZ4 is a lossless data compression algorithm optimized for fast compression and decompression. It belongs to the LZ77 family of byte-oriented compression schemes.

== Features ==
The LZ4 algorithm provides a good trade-off between speed and compression ratio. Typically, it has a smaller (i.e., worse) compression ratio than the similar LZO algorithm, which in turn is worse than algorithms like DEFLATE. However, LZ4 compression speed is similar to LZO and several times faster than DEFLATE, while decompression speed is significantly faster than LZO.

== Design ==
LZ4 only uses a dictionary-matching stage (LZ77) and, unlike other common compression algorithms, does not combine it with an entropy coding stage (e.g. Huffman coding in DEFLATE).

The LZ4 algorithm represents the data as a series of sequences. Each sequence begins with a one-byte token that is broken into two 4-bit fields. The first field represents the number of literal bytes that are to be copied to the output. The second field represents the number of bytes to copy from the already decoded output buffer (with 0 representing the minimum match length of 4 bytes). A value of 15 in either of the bitfields indicates that the length is larger and there is an extra byte of data that is to be added to the length. A value of 255 in these extra bytes indicates that yet another byte is to be added. Hence, arbitrary lengths are represented by a series of extra bytes containing the value 255. The string of literals comes after the token and any extra bytes needed to indicate string length. This is followed by an offset that indicates how far back in the output buffer to begin copying. The extra bytes (if any) of the match-length come at the end of the sequence.

Compression can be carried out in a stream or in blocks. Higher compression ratios can be achieved by investing more effort in finding the best matches. This results in both a smaller output and faster decompression.

LZ4 has two frame formats. The legacy format was very restrictive and relied on an external end-of-file signal, which proved to be a problem in Linux initramfs requiring a workaround to handle zero-padding. The new format is a lot more flexible and has its own end-of-frame marker. It resembles the Zstd frame format in design.

== Implementation ==
The reference implementation in C by Yann Collet is licensed under a BSD license. There are ports and bindings in various languages including Java, C#, Rust, and Python. The Apache Hadoop system uses this algorithm for fast compression. LZ4 was also implemented natively in the Linux kernel 3.11. The FreeBSD, Illumos, ZFS on Linux, and ZFS-OSX implementations of the ZFS filesystem support the LZ4 algorithm for on-the-fly compression. Linux supports LZ4 for SquashFS since 3.19-rc1. LZ4 is also supported by the newer zstd command line utility by Yann Collet, as well as a 7-Zip fork called 7-Zip-zstd.
