= Index of Seychelles-related articles =

Articles (arranged alphabetically) related to Seychelles include:

== . ==
- .sc (Internet country code top-level domain)lloi

== 0–9 ==
- 1981 Seychelles coup d'état attempt
- 1992 CECAFA Cup
- 1994 CECAFA Cup
- 2011 Seychelles First Division
- 2011 in Seychellois football
- 2011 Indian Ocean Island Games
- 2015 CAF Beach Soccer Championship
- 2017 in Seychelles
- 2017 Africa Cup of Nations qualification Group J
- 2019 Africa Cup of Nations qualification Group E

== A ==
- Action of 30 March 2010
- Action of 1 April 2010
- Agriculture in Seychelles
- Air Seychelles
- Air Seychelles destinations
- Aldabra
- Aldabra Group
- Alphonse Airport
- Alphonse Atoll
- Alphonse Group
- Amirante Islands
- Anonyme Island
- Anse aux Pins
- Anse Boileau
- Anse Etoile
- Anse Intendance
- Anse Lazio
- Anse Réunion FC
- Anse Royale
- Anse Source d'Argent
- Aride Island
- Godfrey Denis Armel
- Arthur Grimble (1936-1942)
- Astove Island
- Astove Island Airport
- Assumption Island
- Assumption Island Airport
- Anti-Corruption Commission Seychelles
- Au Cap
- Aurore Island, Seychelles

== B ==
- Baie Lazare
- Baie Sainte Anne
- Battle of Mahé
- Beau Vallon
- Beau Vallon
- Bel Air, Seychelles
- Bel Ombre (Seychelles)
- Bird Island, Seychelles
- Bird Island Airport
- Bishop of Seychelles
- Booby Island, Seychelles
- Boudeuse Island
- Bruce Greatbatch (1969-1973)

== C ==
- Cabinet of Seychelles
- Cachée Island
- Canterbury University (Seychelles)
- Cascade, Seychelles
- Catholic Church in Seychelles
- Central Bank of Seychelles
- Cerf Island
- Charles Richard Mackey O'Brien (1912-1918)
- China–Seychelles relations
- Chauve Souris, Mahé
- Chauve Souris, Praslin
- Coat of arms of Seychelles
- Cocos Island, Seychelles
- Coëtivy Island
- Coëtivy Airport
- Colin Allan (1973-1976)
- Communications in Seychelles
- Conception Island, Seychelles
- Constitutional Court of Seychelles
- Cosmoledo
- Côte d'Or FC
- Cousin Island
- Cousine Island
- Cricket in the Seychelles
- Cuisine of Seychelles
- Culture of Seychelles
- Curieuse Island

== D ==
- D'Arros Island
- D'Arros Island Airport
- Sir de Symons Honey (1928-1934)
- Derrick's sandbank
- Demographics of Seychelles
- Denis Island
- Desnoeufs Island
- Desroches Island
- Desroches Airport
- Diplomatic missions of Seychelles
- Districts of Seychelles
- Domaine de Val des Prés

== E ==
- Economy of Seychelles
- Eden Island, Seychelles
- Education in Seychelles
- Elections in Seychelles
- Elections in Seychelles
- Electoral Commission of Seychelles
- English language
- Ernest Sweet-Escott (1903-1904)
- Étoile Cay
- Eustace Twisleton-Wykeham-Fiennes (1918-1921)
- Eve Island, Seychelles

== F ==
- Farquhar Airport
- Farquhar Atoll
- Farquhar Group
- Félicité Island
- Flag of Seychelles
- Football at the 1979 Indian Ocean Island Games
- Football at the 1993 Indian Ocean Island Games
- Football at the 1998 Indian Ocean Island Games
- Football at the 2003 Indian Ocean Island Games
- Football at the 2011 Indian Ocean Island Games
- Football at the 2015 Indian Ocean Island Games – Men
- Football in Seychelles
- Foreign relations of Seychelles
- Foresters (Mont Fleuri)
- France-Albert René
- France–Seychelles Maritime Boundary Agreement
- Franco-Seychellois
- Frederick Crawford (colonial administrator) (1951-1953)
- Frégate Island
- Frégate Island Airport
- French language

== G ==
- Geography of Seychelles
- Glacis, Seychelles
- Glorioso Islands
- Gordon James Lethem (1934-1936)
- Grand' Anse (Mahe)
- Grand' Anse (Praslin)
- Grande Soeur
- Granitic Seychelles

== H ==
- Hinduism in Seychelles
- History of Seychelles
- Hodoul Island
- Hugh Norman-Walker (1967-1969)

== I ==
- Île Platte
- India–Seychelles relations
- Indo-Seychellois
- International School Seychelles
- Islam in Seychelles
- Island Conservation Society
- Islands of Seychelles

== J ==
- James Mancham
- James Michel
- John Kingsmill Thorp (1958-1961)
- Joseph Aloysius Byrne (1921-1927)
- Julian Asquith, 2nd Earl of Oxford and Asquith (1962-1967)

== K ==
- Kenya–Seychelles relations
- Kenwyn House, Mahé
- Koste Seselwa

== L ==
- La Digue
- La Digue and Inner Islands
- Ladob
- Lady Denison-Pender Shoal
- La Flèche (P32)
- La Passe FC
- La Plaine St. André
- La Riviere Anglaise
- Languages of Seychelles
- Legends of the coco de mer
- Les Mamelles
- Light Stars FC
- Ligne Aérienne Seychelles
- List of airlines of Seychelles
- List of airports in Seychelles
- List of amphibians of Seychelles
- List of banks in Seychelles
- List of birds of the Seychelles
- List of butterflies of Seychelles
- List of cities in Seychelles
- List of companies of Seychelles
- List of diplomatic missions in Seychelles
- List of fish on stamps of Seychelles
- List of flag bearers for Seychelles at the Olympics
- List of football clubs in Seychelles
- List of colonial governors and administrators of Seychelles
- List of lighthouses in Seychelles
- List of mammals in the Seychelles
- List of museums in Seychelles
- List of national parks of Seychelles
- List of political parties in Seychelles
- List of presidents of Seychelles
- List of rivers of Seychelles
- List of Seychellois musicians
- List of Seychellois people
- List of Seychellois records in athletics
- List of supermarket chains in Seychelles
- List of universities in Seychelles
- Long Island, Seychelles

== M ==
- Mahé, Seychelles
- Mahé highlands and surrounding areas Important Bird Area
- Malaysia–Seychelles relations
- Malcolm Stevenson (1927)
- Mamelles Island
- Marianne Island
- Marie Louise Island
- Marie Louise Island Airport
- Mascarene Plateau
- Military of Seychelles
- Mineral industry of Seychelles
- Minister for Foreign Affairs (Seychelles)
- Ministry of Foreign Affairs (Seychelles)
- Mont Buxton
- Mont Fleuri
- Montagne Glacis Important Bird Area
- Montea
- Morne Seychellois
- Moyenne Island
- Music of Seychelles
- MV Beluga Nomination incident

== N ==
- National Agricultural and Fisheries Policy
- National Assembly of Seychelles
- National Library of the Seychelles
- National Youth Service (Seychelles)
- National Youth Service (Seychelles)
- Nature Protection Trust of Seychelles
- Nature Seychelles
- North Island, Seychelles
- North Korea–Seychelles relations
- Northern Coral Group
- Northern Dynamo FC
- Notre Dame de L'Assomption Church, La Digue

== O ==
- Operation Flowers are Blooming
- Orion Air
- Outer Islands (Seychelles)

== P ==
- People's Party (Seychelles)
- People's Stadium, Seychelles
- Percy Selwyn-Clarke (1947-1951)
- Perseverance Island, Seychelles
- Petite Soeur
- Picard Island
- Plaisance, Seychelles
- Platte Island Airport
- Pointe La Rue
- Poivre Atoll
- Politics of Seychelles
- Port Glaud
- Port Island, Seychelles
- Port of Victoria (Seychelles)
- Postage stamps and postal history of Seychelles
- Praslin
- Praslin Island Airport
- Praslin National Park and surrounding areas Important Bird Area
- Prime Minister of Seychelles
- Providence Atoll
- PS Constant
- PS Topaz
- Public holidays in Seychelles

== R ==
- Rat Island (Seychelles)
- Red Star FC (Seychelles)
- Religion in Seychelles
- Remire Island
- Remire Island Airport
- Remire Reef
- Revengers FC
- Roche Caiman
- Roche Caiman Power Station
- Roman Catholic Diocese of Port Victoria
- Roman Catholicism in Seychelles
- Romainville Island, Seychelles
- Round Island, Mahe
- Rugby union in the Seychelles
- Russia–Seychelles relations

== S ==
- Saint Louis, Seychelles
- Saint Louis Suns United
- Sainte Anne Marine National Park
- Sèche Island
- Sega music
- Seychelles at the 2011 World Championships in Athletics
- Seychelles at the 2013 World Championships in Athletics
- Seychelles at the 2015 World Championships in Athletics •
- Seychelles at the 2017 World Championships in Athletics
- Seychelles at the Commonwealth Games
- Seychelles at the 1994 Commonwealth Games
- Seychelles at the 2006 Commonwealth Games
- Seychelles at the 2010 Commonwealth Games
- Seychelles at the 2014 Commonwealth Games
- Seychelles at the Olympics
- Seychelles at the 1980 Summer Olympics
- Seychelles at the 1984 Summer Olympics
- Seychelles at the 1992 Summer Olympics
- Seychelles at the 1996 Summer Olympics
- Seychelles at the 2000 Summer Olympics
- Seychelles at the 2004 Summer Olympics
- Seychelles at the 2008 Summer Olympics
- Seychelles at the 2012 Summer Olympics
- Seychelles at the 2016 Summer Olympics
- Seychelles at the Paralympics
- Seychelles at the 1992 Summer Paralympics
- Seychelles at the 2016 Summer Paralympics
- Seychelles at the 2011 World Aquatics Championships
- Seychelles at the 2013 World Aquatics Championships
- Seychelles at the 2015 World Aquatics Championships
- Seychelles at the 2017 World Aquatics Championships
- Seychelles Broadcasting Corporation
- Seychelles Chess Championship
- Seychelles Child Development Study
- Seychelles Coast Guard
- Seychelles community in the EU
- Seychelles Cricket Association
- Seychelles Democratic Party
- Seychelles FA Cup
- Seychelles Federation of Workers' Unions
- Seychelles First Division
- Seychelles Football Federation
- Seychelles Hockey Federation
- Seychelles International Airport
- Seychelles International Repatriation Onward Program
- Seychelles International Safari Air
- Seychelles Islands Foundation
- Seychelles League
- Seychelles Marketing Board
- Seychelles Medical and Dental Association
- Seychelles Medical and Dental Council
- Seychelles microcontinent
- Seychelles Movement for Democracy
- Seychelles Nation
- Seychelles National Archives
- Seychelles national basketball team
- Seychelles national beach soccer team
- Seychelles national cricket team
- Seychelles national football team
- Seychelles national under-17 football team
- Seychelles National Movement
- Seychelles National Party
- Seychelles national rugby union team
- Seychelles Natural History Museum
- Seychelles News Agency
- Seychelles Olympic and Commonwealth Games Association
- Seychelles Party
- Seychelles People's Defence Force Air Wing
- Seychelles People's Progressive Front
- Seychelles Polytechnic
- Seychelles Port Authority
- Seychelles Scout Association Seychelles–Tanzania Maritime Boundary Agreement
- Seychelles Time
- Seychelles Tourism Board
- Seychelles–United States relations
- Seychelles Workers Union
- Seychellense Ambassador to China
- Seychellense Ambassador to United States
- Seychellois Creole
- Seychellois Creole people
- Seychellois constitutional commission election, 1992
- Seychellois constitutional referendum, 1992
- Seychellois constitutional referendum, 1993
- Seychellois general election, 1979
- Seychellois general election, 1993
- Seychellois general election, 1998
- Seychellois parliamentary election, 1948
- Seychellois parliamentary election, 1951
- Seychellois parliamentary election, 1953
- Seychellois parliamentary election, 1957
- Seychellois parliamentary election, 1963
- Seychellois parliamentary election, 1967
- Seychellois parliamentary election, 1970
- Seychellois parliamentary election, 1974
- Seychellois parliamentary election, 1983
- Seychellois parliamentary election, 1987
- Seychellois parliamentary election, 2002
- Seychellois parliamentary election, 2007
- Seychellois parliamentary election, 2011
- Seychellois parliamentary election, 2016
- Seychellois passport
- Seychellois presidential election, 1984
- Seychellois presidential election, 1989
- Seychellois presidential election, 2001
- Seychellois presidential election, 2006
- Seychellois presidential election, 2011
- Seychellois presidential election, 2015
- Seychellois rupee
- Seychellois units of measurement
- Shark chutney
- Silhouette Island
- Sino-Seychellois
- Slavery in Seychelles
- Soleil Island
- Songoula
- Souris Island
- Southern Coral Group
- Sport in Seychelles
- Stade d’Amitié
- Stade Linité
- State House, Seychelles
- St Francis FC (Seychelles)
- St. Francis of Assisi Church, Baie Lazare
- St. François Atoll
- St. Joseph Atoll
- St Michel United FC
- St. Pierre Island, Farquhar
- St. Pierre Island, Praslin
- St Roch United
- Ste. Anne Island
- Super Magic Brothers
- Seychelles Civil Aviation Authority

== T ==
- Takamaka
- Tamil Seychellois
- Telecommunications in Seychelles
- Telephone numbers in Seychelles
- Television in Seychelles
- Thérèse Island
- The Lions FC
- Thorpe Bank
- Tourism in Seychelles
- Transport in Seychelles

== U ==
- United States drone base in Seychelles
- University of Seychelles

== V ==
- Vache Island, Seychelles
- Vallée de Mai
- Vanilla Islands
- Vice President of Seychelles
- Victoria
- Victoria Botanical Gardens
- Visa policy of Seychelles
- Visa requirements for Seychellois citizens

== W ==
- Walter Edward Davidson (1904-1912)
- Whaling in Seychelles
- Wildlife of Seychelles
- Wizard Reef
- Women in Seychelles

== See also ==
- Outline of Seychelles
