= Outline of Seychelles =

Overview of and topical guide to Seychelles

The Flag of Seychelles

The Coat of arms of Seychelles

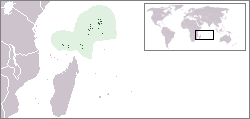
The location of Seychelles

An enlargeable relief map of the Republic of Seychelles

The following outline is provided as an overview of and topical guide to Seychelles:

Seychelles – sovereign island nation located in the Indian Ocean and comprising, according to the Constitution, 155 islands of the Seychelles Archipelago, some 1,500 kilometres (900 mi) east of mainland Africa and northeast of the Island of Madagascar. Other nearby island countries and territories include Zanzibar to the west, Mauritius and Réunion to the south, Comoros and Mayotte to the southwest, and the Suvadives of the Maldives to the northeast. Seychelles has the smallest population of any sovereign state of Africa.

== General reference ==
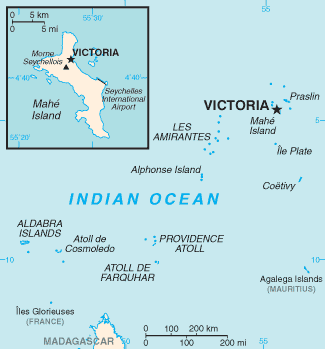
An enlargeable basic map of Seychelles

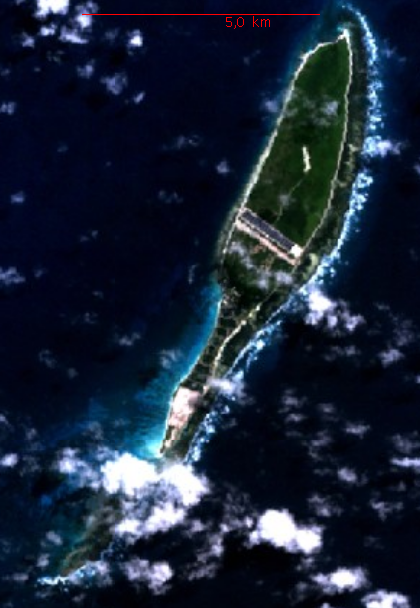
An enlargeable satellite image of the island of Coetivy in the Seychelles

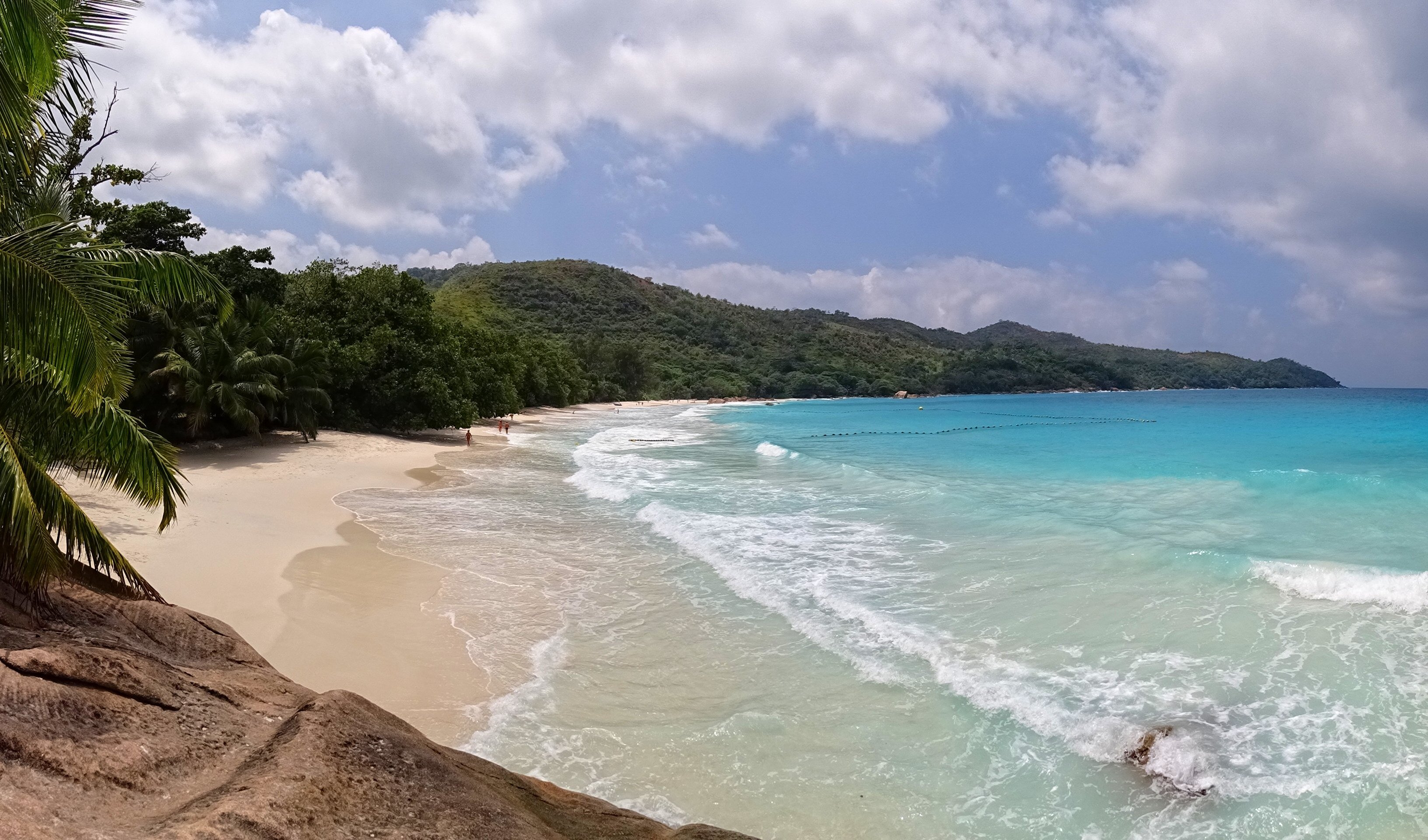
Anse Lazio seen from north-east

- Pronunciation: /seɪˈʃɛlz/
- Common English country name: Seychelles
- Official English country name: The Republic of Seychelles
- Common endonym(s): Sesel, Seychelles
- Official endonym(s):
- Adjectival(s): Seychellois
- Demonym(s): Seychellois (male) / Seychelloise (female)
- ISO country codes: SC, SYC, 690
- ISO region codes: See ISO 3166-2:SC
- Internet country code top-level domain: .sc

== Geography of Seychelles ==
Geography of Seychelles

- Seychelles is: an island country of 155 islands
- Location:
  - Eastern Hemisphere and Southern Hemisphere
  - Africa (off its east coast, north of Madagascar)
    - East Africa
    - Southern Africa
  - Indian Ocean
  - Time zone: Seychelles Time (UTC+04)
  - Extreme points of Seychelles
    - High: Morne Seychellois on Mahé 905 m (2,969 ft)
    - Low: Indian Ocean 0 m
  - Land boundaries: none
  - Coastline: Indian Ocean 491 km
- Population of Seychelles: 98,000 – 190th most populous country
- Area of Seychelles: 451 km^{2}
- Atlas of Seychelles

=== Environment of Seychelles ===
- Climate of Seychelles
- Environmental issues in Seychelles
- Renewable energy in Seychelles
- Protected areas of Seychelles
  - National parks of Seychelles
- Wildlife of Seychelles
  - Flora of Seychelles
  - Fauna of Seychelles
    - Birds of Seychelles
    - Mammals of Seychelles
    - Amphibians of Seychelles

==== Natural geographic features of Seychelles ====
- Glaciers in Seychelles: None
- Rivers of Seychelles
- World Heritage Sites in Seychelles

==== Ecoregions of Seychelles ====
List of ecoregions in Seychelles

==== Administrative divisions of Seychelles ====
Administrative divisions of Seychelles

- Districts of Seychelles
- Cities in Seychelles

=== Demography of Seychelles ===
Demographics of Seychelles

== Government and politics of Seychelles ==
Politics of Seychelles

- Form of government:
- Capital of Seychelles: Victoria
- Elections in Seychelles
- Political parties in Seychelles

=== Branches of the government of Seychelles ===
Government of Seychelles

==== Executive branch of the government of Seychelles ====
- Head of state and Head of government: President of Seychelles, Patrick Herminie
- Cabinet of Seychelles

==== Legislative branch of the government of Seychelles ====
- Parliament of Seychelles (bicameral)
  - Upper house: Senate of Seychelles
  - Lower house: House of Commons of Seychelles

==== Judicial branch of the government of Seychelles ====
Court system of Seychelles

- Supreme Court of Seychelles

=== Foreign relations of Seychelles ===
Foreign relations of Seychelles

- Diplomatic missions in Seychelles
- Diplomatic missions of Seychelles

==== International organisation membership ====
The Republic of Seychelles is a member of:

- African, Caribbean, and Pacific Group of States (ACP)
- African Development Bank Group (AfDB)
- African Union (AU)
- Common Market for Eastern and Southern Africa (COMESA)
- Commonwealth of Nations
- Food and Agriculture Organization (FAO)
- Group of 77 (G77)
- Indian Ocean Commission (InOC)
- International Atomic Energy Agency (IAEA)
- International Bank for Reconstruction and Development (IBRD)
- International Civil Aviation Organization (ICAO)
- International Criminal Court (ICCt) (signatory)
- International Criminal Police Organization (Interpol)
- International Federation of Red Cross and Red Crescent Societies (IFRCS)
- International Finance Corporation (IFC)
- International Fund for Agricultural Development (IFAD)
- International Labour Organization (ILO)
- International Maritime Organization (IMO)
- International Monetary Fund (IMF)
- International Olympic Committee (IOC)
- International Organization for Standardization (ISO) (correspondent)
- International Red Cross and Red Crescent Movement (ICRM)
- International Telecommunication Union (ITU)
- International Trade Union Confederation (ITUC)
- Multilateral Investment Guarantee Agency (MIGA)
- Nonaligned Movement (NAM)
- Organisation internationale de la Francophonie (OIF)
- Organisation for the Prohibition of Chemical Weapons (OPCW)
- Southern African Development Community (SADC)
- United Nations (UN)
- United Nations Conference on Trade and Development (UNCTAD)
- United Nations Educational, Scientific, and Cultural Organization (UNESCO)
- United Nations Industrial Development Organization (UNIDO)
- Universal Postal Union (UPU)
- World Customs Organization (WCO)
- World Federation of Trade Unions (WFTU)
- World Health Organization (WHO)
- World Intellectual Property Organization (WIPO)
- World Meteorological Organization (WMO)
- World Tourism Organization (UNWTO)
- World Trade Organization (WTO) (observer)

=== Law and order in Seychelles ===
Law of Seychelles

- Constitution of Seychelles
- LGBT rights in Seychelles
- Law enforcement in Seychelles

=== Military of Seychelles ===
Military of Seychelles

Seychelles People's Defence Force

- Command
  - Commander-in-chief:
- Forces
  - Infantry Unit (Seychelles)
  - Seychelles Coast Guard
  - Seychelles Air Force

=== Local government in Seychelles ===
Local government in Seychelles

== History of Seychelles ==
History of Seychelles

- Current events of Seychelles

== Culture of Seychelles ==
Culture of Seychelles

- Cuisine of Seychelles
- Languages of Seychelles
- National symbols of Seychelles
  - Coat of arms of Seychelles
  - Flag of Seychelles
  - National anthem of Seychelles
- Public holidays in Seychelles
- Religion in Seychelles
  - Roman Catholicism in Seychelles
  - Hinduism in Seychelles
  - Islam in Seychelles
- World Heritage Sites in Seychelles

=== Art in Seychelles ===
- Music of Seychelles
  - Seychellois musicians

=== Sports in Seychelles ===
Sports in Seychelles

- Football in Seychelles
- Seychelles at the Commonwealth Games
- Seychelles at the Olympics
- Seychelles at the Paralympics

== Economy and infrastructure of Seychelles ==
Economy of Seychelles

- Economic rank, by nominal GDP (2007): 172nd (one hundred and seventy second)
- Agriculture in Seychelles
- Communications in Seychelles
  - Internet in Seychelles
- Companies of Seychelles
- Currency of Seychelles: Rupee
  - ISO 4217: SCR
- Energy in Seychelles
  - Renewable energy in Seychelles
- Mineral industry of Seychelles
- Mining in Seychelles
- Tourism in Seychelles
  - Museums in Seychelles
  - Visa policy of Seychelles
- Transport in Seychelles
  - Airports in Seychelles
  - Rail transport in Seychelles

== Education in Seychelles ==
Education in Seychelles

== See also ==
Seychelles

- Index of Seychelles-related articles
- List of international rankings
- List of Seychelles-related topics
- Member state of the Commonwealth of Nations
- Member state of the United Nations
- Outline of Africa
- Outline of geography
