= ISO 3166-2:SC =

Entry for Seychelles in ISO 3166-2

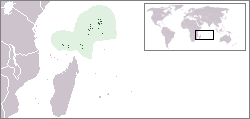
Location Seychelles

ISO 3166-2:SC is the entry for Seychelles in ISO 3166-2, part of the ISO 3166 standard published by the International Organization for Standardization (ISO), which defines codes for the names of the principal subdivisions (e.g., provinces or states) of all countries coded in ISO 3166-1.

Currently for Seychelles, ISO 3166-2 codes are defined for 27 districts. The Outer Islands, which are not part of any district, are not listed.

Each code consists of two parts, separated by a hyphen. The first part is SC, the ISO 3166-1 alpha-2 code of Seychelles. The second part is two digits:

- 01–23: districts created in 1979
- 24–25: districts created in 1998
- 26–27: districts created in 2020

The codes for each group of districts are assigned in French alphabetical order, except Au Cap, whose code is assigned based on its former name, Anse Louis.

== Current codes ==
Subdivision names are listed as in the ISO 3166-2 standard published by the ISO 3166 Maintenance Agency (ISO 3166/MA).

ISO 639-1 and ISO 639-3 codes are used to represent subdivision names in the following administrative languages:

- (en): English
- (fr): French
- (crs): Seselwa (Seychellois Creole)

Click on the button in the header to sort each column.

Code	Subdivision name (en)	Subdivision name (fr)	Subdivision name (crs)
SC-01	Anse aux Pins	Anse aux Pins	Ans o Pen
SC-02	Anse Boileau	Anse Boileau	Ans Bwalo
SC-03	Anse Etoile	Anse Étoile	Ans Etwal
SC-05	Anse Royale	Anse Royale	Ans Royal
SC-04	Au Cap	Au Cap	O Kap
SC-06	Baie Lazare	Baie Lazare	Be Lazar
SC-07	Baie Sainte Anne	Baie Sainte-Anne	Be Sent Ann
SC-08	Beau Vallon	Beau Vallon	Bovalon
SC-09	Bel Air	Bel Air	Beler
SC-10	Bel Ombre	Bel Ombre	Belonm
SC-11	Cascade	Cascade	Kaskad
SC-16	English River	La Rivière Anglaise	Larivyer Anglez
SC-12	Glacis	Glacis	Glasi
SC-13	Grand Anse Mahe	Grand'Anse Mahé	Grand Ans Mae
SC-14	Grand Anse Praslin	Grand'Anse Praslin	Grand Ans Pralen
SC-26	Ile Perseverance I	Île Persévérance I	
SC-27	Ile Perseverance II	Île Persévérance II	
SC-15	La Digue	La Digue	Ladig
SC-24	Les Mamelles	Les Mamelles	Lemamel
SC-17	Mont Buxton	Mont Buxton	Mon Bikston
SC-18	Mont Fleuri	Mont Fleuri	Mon Fleri
SC-19	Plaisance	Plaisance	Plezans
SC-20	Pointe Larue	Pointe La Rue	Pwent Lari
SC-21	Port Glaud	Port Glaud	Porglo
SC-25	Roche Caiman	Roche Caïman	Ros Kaiman
SC-22	Saint Louis	Saint-Louis	Sen Lwi
SC-23	Takamaka	Takamaka	Takamaka

== Changes ==
The following changes to the entry have been announced in newsletters by the ISO 3166/MA since the first publication of ISO 3166-2 in 1998. ISO stopped issuing newsletters in 2013.

Newsletter	Date issued	Description of change in newsletter	Code/Subdivision change
Newsletter I-8	2007-04-17	Addition of the administrative subdivisions and of their code elements	Subdivisions added: 23 districts
Newsletter II-2	2010-06-30	Update of the administrative structure and languages and update of the list source	Subdivisions added: SC-24 Les Mamelles; SC-25 Roche Caiman

The following changes to the entry are listed on ISO's online catalogue, the Online Browsing Platform:

Effective date of change	Short description of change (en)	Code/Subdivision change
2020-11-24	Addition of district SC-26, SC-27; Update List Source	Subdivisions added: SC-26 Ile Perseverance I SC-27 Ile Perseverance II

== See also ==
- Subdivisions of Seychelles
- FIPS region codes of Seychelles
