= Aurore Island, Seychelles =

Artificial island in Seychelles

Aurore Island
- Location within Seychelles

Geography
- Location: Seychelles, Indian Ocean
- Coordinates: 4°36′S 55°27′E
- Archipelago: Inner Islands, Seychelles
- Adjacent to: Indian Ocean
- Total islands: 1
- Major islands: Aurore
- Area: 0.6 km^{2} (0.23 sq mi)
- Length: 1.3 km (0.81 mi)
- Width: 0.6 km (0.37 mi)
- Coastline: 3.5 km (2.17 mi)
- Highest elevation: 5 m (16 ft)

Administration
- Seychelles
- Group: Granitic Seychelles
- Sub-Group: Mahe Islands
- Sub-Group: Mahe Port Islands
- Districts: Anse Etoile
- Largest settlement: Aurore (pop. 100)

Demographics
- Population: 100 (2014)
- Pop. density: 1,754/km^{2} (4543/sq mi)
- Ethnic groups: Creole, French, East Africans, Indians.

Additional information
- Time zone: SCT (UTC+4)
- ISO code: SC-03
- Official website: www.edenisland.sc

Aurore Island is an artificial island in Seychelles, lying 2 km from the capital Victoria.

== History ==
The island was created artificially during the 2000s. It belongs to the Mahe Port Islands, which are mostly artificial islands created by funds from Dubai when the Dubai dredger was placed in Seychelles. In 2013 work on the island has begun. By 2020, the island should house a population of 2,000. In 2016, the new golf course was being built.

== Administration ==
The island belongs to Anse Etoile District.

== Tourism ==
The island's plan is mostly residential. There are a few hotels and a golf course.

== Image gallery ==
Map 1

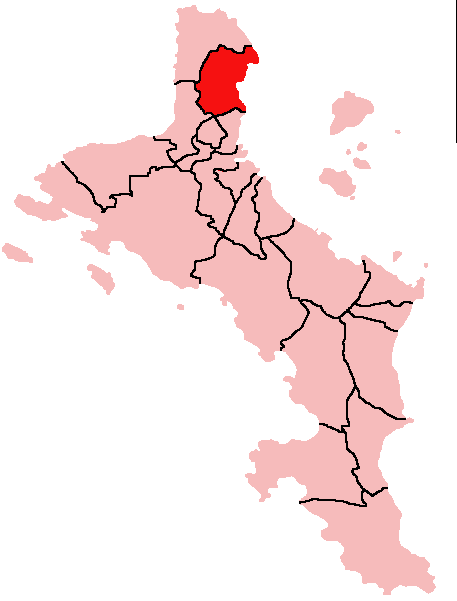
District Map
