= List of cities in Seychelles =

This articles shows a list of cities in Seychelles.

== Cities of Seychelles ==
- Anse Boileau
- Beau Vallon
- Takamaka
- Victoria, capital and largest city
- Grand Anse Mahe

== See also ==
- Districts of Seychelles
