= Thomas W. Clarkson =

Researcher

- Occupation: Professor

Thomas W. Clarkson is a heavy metals toxicologist and an emeritus professor in the department of environmental medicine at the University of Rochester Medical Center. His area of expertise is mercury, and he has been involved in the Seychelles Child Development Study. After Karen Wetterhahn's death, Clarkson's lab analyzed the dimethylmercury levels that had been responsible for her death.

== Education ==
Clarkson has a bachelor's degree in chemistry (1953) and a PhD in biochemistry from the University of Manchester (1956).

== Selected publications ==
- Clarkson, Thomas W.; Miller, Morton W. (1973). Mercury, Mercurials and Mercaptans. Charles C. Thomas Publishing.
- Suzuki, Tsuguyoshi; Clarkson, Thomas W. (1991). Advances in Mercury Toxicology. Plenum Press.
