= Gerard Ah-Shung =

Seychellois public servant

Gerard Ah-Shung (15 January 1947–6 June 2016) was a Seychellois public servant who served as electoral commissioner of the Electoral Commission of Seychelles, from 1993 till 1999, with Hendrick Gappy succeeding him.
