= Souris =

Souris may refer to:

== Places ==
- Souris, Manitoba, Canada
- Souris, Prince Edward Island, Canada
- Souris, North Dakota, United States
- Souris Island, Seychelles
- Souris River, in Canada and the United States

== Electoral districts ==
- Souris (electoral district), a federal electoral district in Manitoba
- Souris (Saskatchewan electoral district), a provincial electoral district

== People ==
- André Souris (1899–1970), Belgian composer
- George Souris (born 1949), Australian politician
- Léo Souris (1911–1990), Belgian composer
- Theodore Souris (1925–2002), American jurist

== Other uses ==
- RCAF Station Souris, a Second World War British Commonwealth Air Training Plan station near Souris, Manitoba
