= Antoine Abel =

Antoine Abel was a poet from Seychelles born on 27 November 1934 in Anse Boileau, and died on 19 October 2004 in Mahé, Seychelles. He is considered the father of Seychelles literature.

== Biography ==
Antoine Abel was born on 27 November 1934 into a modest peasant family in the district of Anse Boileau, in the west of the island of Mahé, the main island of the Seychelles archipelago. He completed his primary schooling at Anse Boileau and learned masonry.

In 1955, Antoine Abel had the opportunity to go to Switzerland for his secondary education. He returned 4 years later and took a position as a teacher in Seychelles in 1959. After some time, he went to the United Kingdom to complete his studies at the University of Reading. There he obtained a Certificate of Advanced Studies in Education Science for Rural Areas. After a brief return to Mahé during which he taught agriculture, he returned to the United Kingdom to attend a teacher training course at the University of Bristol. This last training allowed him to join the Seychelles Teacher Training College (École normale Supérieure) in Victoria as a teacher, a position he held until his retirement in 1986.

The last fifteen to twenty years of his life were marked by illness, and his literary production was affected by it as he published less and less over the years.

== Works ==
Antoine Abel became known to the public for his poetic works as well as for his short stories. But he also stands out for the great variety of writings he has produced: poetry, short stories as mentioned above, but also theater, novel, folk tales, essay, comic strip and even a treatise on traditional medicine.

- Coco sec (1969)
- Une tortue se rappelle (1977)
- Contes et poémes des Seychelles (1977)
- Paille en queue (1969)
