= Souris Island =

Island in Seychelles

Native name: Ile aux Souris Nickname: Rat Island
- Location within Seychelles

Geography
- Location: Seychelles, Indian Ocean
- Coordinates: 4°37′S 55°30′E
- Archipelago: Inner Islands, Seychelles
- Adjacent to: Indian Ocean
- Total islands: 1
- Major islands: Souris
- Area: 0.005 km^{2} (0.0019 sq mi)
- Length: 0.1 km (0.06 mi)
- Width: 0.1 km (0.06 mi)
- Coastline: 0.25 km (0.155 mi)
- Highest elevation: 14 m (46 ft)
- Highest point: Souris

Administration
- Seychelles
- Group: Granitic Seychelles
- Sub-Group: Mahe Islands
- Districts: Anse Royale

Demographics
- Population: 0 (2014)
- Pop. density: 0/km^{2} (0/sq mi)
- Ethnic groups: Creole, French, East Africans, Indians.

Additional information
- Time zone: SCT (UTC+4)
- ISO code: SC-05
- Official website: www.seychelles.travel/en/discover/the-islands/

Ile aux Souris is an island in Seychelles, lying in the eastern shores of Mahe.

With a 14-metre elevation ‘it stands just inside the long line of coral reef fringing the coasts of Anse Royale and Anse Bougainville. It is rocky, about 500 metres south west of Pointe au Sel. In the vicinity you can find the Seychelles university.

The island belongs to Anse Royale District.

== Image gallery ==
Map 1

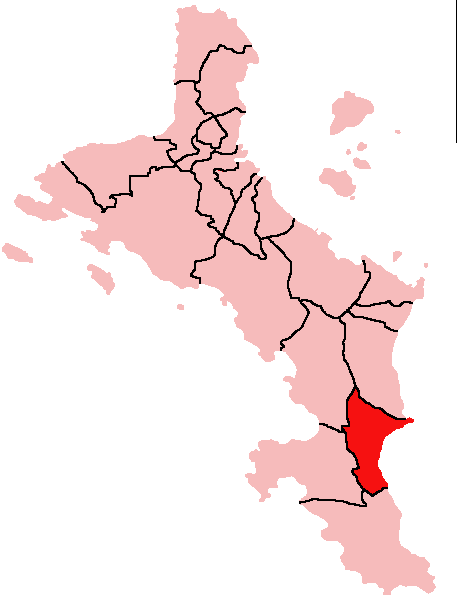
District Map

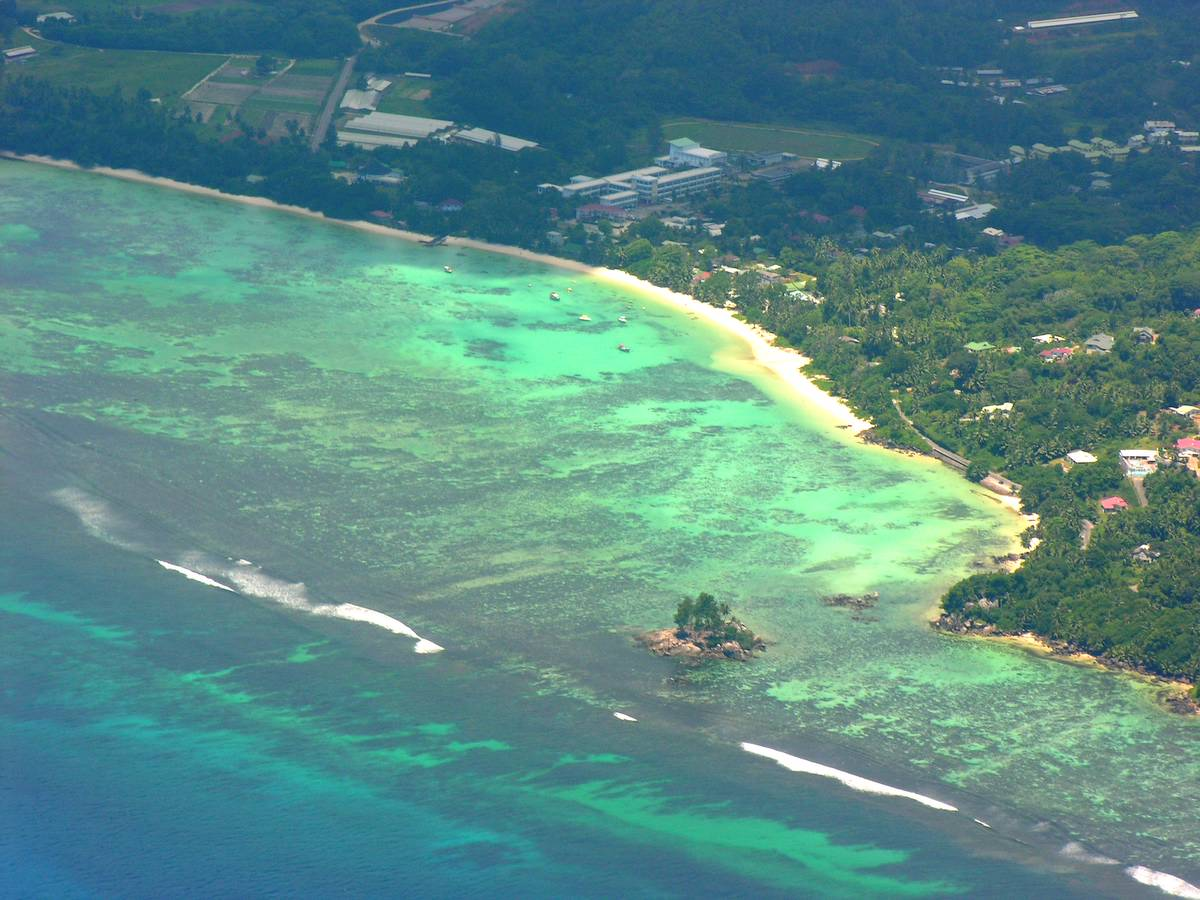
Souris Island in front of the University of Mahe
