= Education in Seychelles =

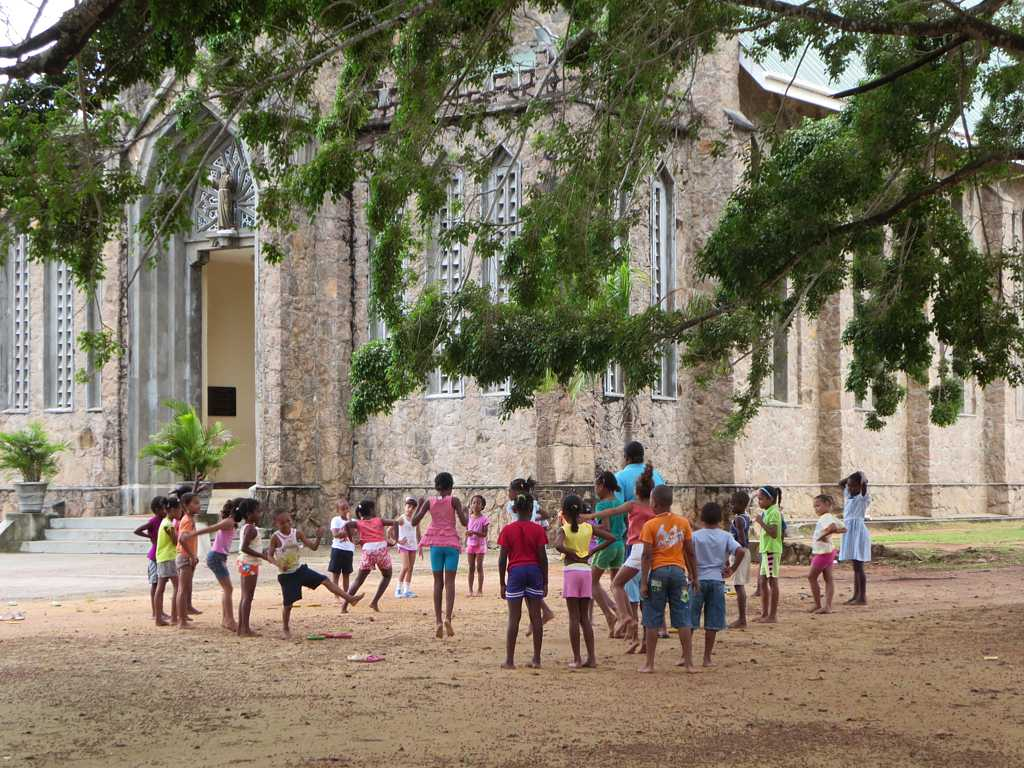
Children take a class beside the neo-Gothic Church of St. Francis of Assisi (1953) in Baie Lazare on Mahe Island, Seychelles.

Education in Seychelles is free and compulsory from the ages of 6 to 15. The language of instruction is Creole from ages 6 to 10, and then English is gradually introduced as the language of instruction, with French introduced as a foreign language. It has evolved from private mission schools to compulsory public education in the modern system. It is the only African country whose education system features among the top 50 in the world. Seychelles has the highest literacy rate of any country in sub-Saharan Africa at 96.20%. According to The World Factbook – Central Intelligence Agency as of 2018, 95.9% of the population age 15 and over can read and write in Seychelles were respectively literate.

== History ==
Until the mid-19th century, little formal education was available in Seychelles. Both the Roman Catholic and Anglican churches opened mission schools in 1851. The missions continued to operate the secondary schools — Seychelles College run by the Brothers of Christian Instruction and Regina Mundi Convent run by the Sisters of St. Joseph of Cluny — even after the government became responsible for education in 1944, though primary schools were established throughout the islands with mainly untrained teachers. After a teacher training college opened in 1959 'to cater for in-service teachers of promise without previous training, and to train new entrants to teaching' (quote from an article by S. Quinlan: "The Teacher Training College" in Seychelles Government Bulletin, 27 July 1961) a two-year training course was offered for secondary teachers or a one-year course for in-service primary teachers, resulting in a supply of locally trained teachers becoming available. Since 1981 a system of free education has been in effect requiring attendance by all children in grades one to nine, beginning at age five. Formerly, school-age children were required to participate in the National Youth Service (NYS).

The literacy rate for school-aged children had risen to more than 90 per cent by the late 1980s. Many older Seychellois had not been taught to read or write in their childhood, but adult education classes helped raise adult literacy from 60 per cent to a claimed 85 per cent in 1991.

== Current status ==
Education is compulsory up to the age of 16, and free through secondary school until age 18. Students must pay for uniforms, but not for books or tuition. In 2002, the gross primary enrolment rate was 114 per cent and the net primary enrolment rate was 100 per cent. Gross and net enrolment ratios are based on the number of students formally registered in primary school and therefore do not necessarily reflect actual school attendance. Primary school attendance statistics are not available for Seychelles. As of 2002, 99 per cent of children who started primary school were likely to reach grade 5.

Children are first taught to read and write in Creole. Beginning in grade three, English is used as a teaching language in certain subjects. French is introduced in grade six.

Private education has been an option in Seychelles since the late 1960s, however, it was only in 1994 that Seychellois students were allowed to attend non-state schools. There are three private schools in Mahe; The International School Seychelles, L'Ecole Francaise, and The Independent School. There is also a Montessori school. The International School and the Independent School offer A-level courses (post-16). There is one private school in Praslin, the Vijay International School Praslin, which currently educates children up to A-Level standard. Altogether some 2000 students are educated in the private sector.

Students can attend Seychelles Polytechnic (1,600 students in 1991) for pre-university studies or other training. In 1993, responding to popular pressure, the government eliminated the requirement of NYS participation to enter the Polytechnic. However, it strongly encouraged students to complete NYS before beginning to work at age eighteen. The largest number of students were in teacher training (302), business studies (255), humanities and science (226), and hotels and tourism (132).

On 17 September 2009, the University of Seychelles was established. There are currently 175 students based on two campuses. The main campus is situated at Anse Royale and the second campus for the School of Education is located at Mont Fleuri.
