= Bernard Adonis =

Seychellois politician

- Occupation: Politician

Bernard Adonis was a member of the National Assembly of Seychelles. He was a member of the Seychelles People's Progressive Front (now the People's Party), and was elected to the Assembly for the Plaisance district in 2007. He did not stand in the September 2011 election.
