= Songoula =

Fable of a monkey like figure in Seychellois folklore

Songoula is a fable of a monkey or ape like figure in Seychellois folklore which has been told to young children in the islands down the generations. In the story "Sangoula and the King's Pool, the Sangoula is described as very dirty, with a long brown tail. In this story, the Sangoula is captured by a wily tortoise after he evades many guards trying to keep him from swimming in the king's pool. However, he then convinces the king that only rope the fiber of the banana tree will bind him. Easily breaking his bonds, the Songoula then runs away laughing.
