= Au Cap =

Coordinates: 4°42′S 55°31′E

- District
- Motto: Building upon Charm Together
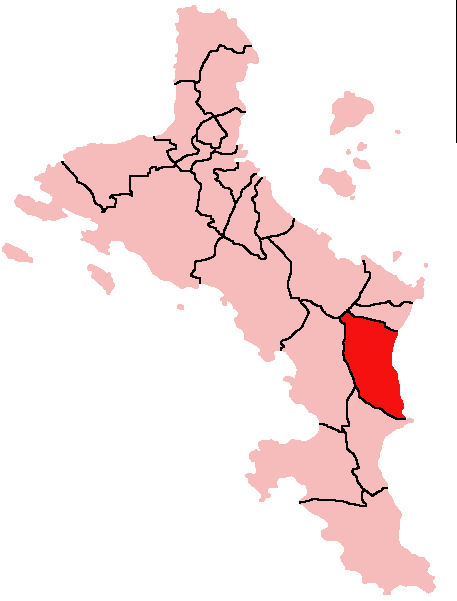
- Location within Mahé island, Seychelles
- Country: Seychelles

Government
  - District Administrator: Sabrina Assary
  - Member of National Assembly: Hon. Kelly Samynadin (LDS)

Population (2024 Estimate)
  - Total: 6,047
- Time zone: Seychelles Time

Au Cap (French pronunciation: [o kap]) is an administrative district of Seychelles located on the island of Mahé.

Au Cap has a surface area of 875 hectares. It is bordered to the north by the district of Anse Aux Pins, to the south by the district of Anse Royale, to the west by the district of Anse Boileau and to the east by the Indian Ocean. The maximum latitude is 600 meters.

While there are numerous secondary roads allowing vehicles circulation within and to and from other neighboring districts, the main recorded connections are the primary roads. Since Au Cap is closed to the west by the mountain range and to the east by the ocean, the easiest access routes are from the north, through Anse Aux Pins and from the south, through Anse Royale. This is called the East Coast Road. However, a third primary road goes through Au Cap, crossing the mountain range and entering Anse Boileau. This is called the Montagne Posée Road.

There are also countless tertiary paths and routes within and to Au Cap from its neighbors.

From a 2024 census, the population then stood at 6,047 residents, with 5,582 Seychellois residents. In 2024, 71 births were recorded.

== Sub-districts ==
As of 2025, the website of the Ministry of Local Government and Community Affairs lists these sub-districts:

- Turtle Bay 1
- Turtle Bay 2
- Gaza Estate
- Jerusalem Estate
- Mandarine Estate
- Val Des Pres Estate
- St. Roch
- St. Joseph Estate
- La Plaine St. Andre
- Anse Aux Courbe
- Sawa Sawa Farm
- D’Offay Estate
- Reef Estate – Longue Mare
- Green Estate
- Hermitte Estate
- Capucin
- Pointe Au Sel - Upper Moripa
- Pointe Au Sel 1
- Pointe Au Sel 2 (dan Tol, anba Zanmalak, upper pointe Au Sel)
- Pointe Au Sel (Sadeco area)
- Cap Lelefan
- Cacao Estate
- Montagne Posée
