= Seychelles Polytechnic =

Government-owned tertiary institution located in Anse Royale, Mahé

- Motto: Gateway to Opportunities
- Type: Public
- Established: 24 January 1983; 43 years ago
- Location: Anse Royale, Mahé, Seychelles
- Website: www.seypoly.edu.sc

Seychelles Polytechnic is a government-owned tertiary institution located in Anse Royale, Mahé. The institution currently offer three programme areas in Business & Secretarial Studies, Visual Arts and the Manchester Twinning Programme, a first-year degree programme obtained in partnership with the University of Manchester.

== History ==
The institution was inaugurated on 24 January 1983 by France-Albert René as a post-secondary education and training with courses initially totalling eleven. In 2005, Seychelles Institute of Technology was formed from the old Technical Programme Area and the School of Advanced Level Studies replaced the Academic Programme Area.

== Notable staff and alumni ==
Anne Lafortune, who was the Polytechnic's director, went on to take a leading role in the country's tourism industry before she became an ambassador.

- Jean-Paul Adam (1977), former Minister for Foreign Affairs
- Azarel Ernesta, first female Speaker of the National Assembly
- Rolph Payet (1968), first President & Vice-Chancellor of the University of Seychelles.
- Justin Valentin (1971), Minister of Education.

== See also ==
- List of universities in Seychelles
- Education in Seychelles
