= Kenya–Seychelles relations =

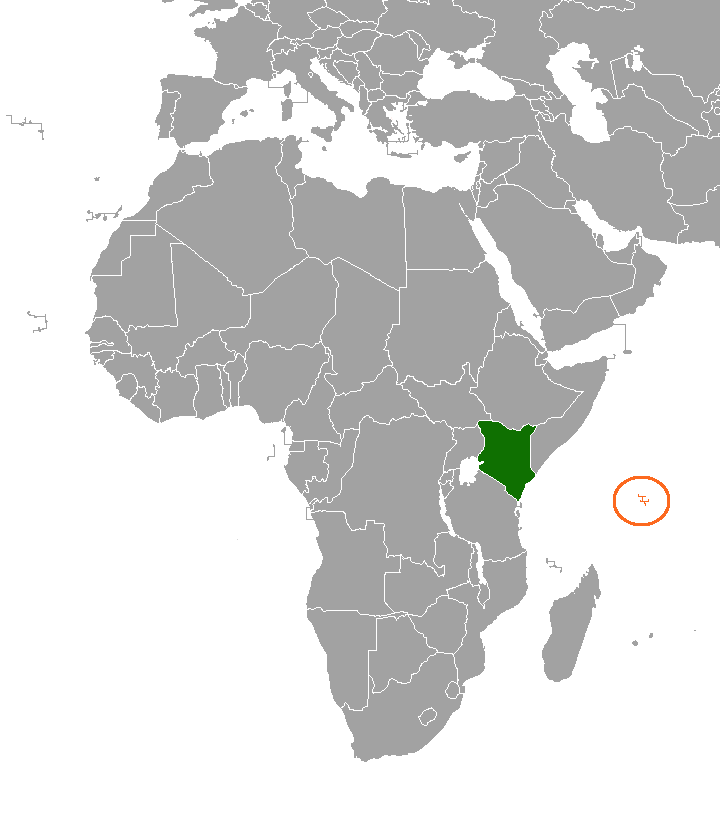

- Kenya: Seychelles

Kenya–Seychelles relations are the bilateral relations between Kenya and Seychelles. Neither country has a resident ambassador. Both countries are members of the African Union, Non-Aligned Movement and the Commonwealth of Nations.

== History ==
President Danny Faure of Seychelles made a state visit to Kenya in April 2017. He held talks with President Kenyatta. There were numerous agreements signed and both countries agreed to further improve bilateral relations, trade ties and military ties (maritime affairs).

Kenya's Foreign Cabinet Secretary, Amina Mohamed made an official visit to Seychelles. She met and held talks with President James Michel.

Seychelles Foreign Minister also visited Kenya in 2014. He held talks with Kenya's president and the Foreign Cabinet Secretary.

Kenya's president described the bilateral relationship as a "natural partnership".

Kenya's president and Seychelles' President held talks during the US-Africa Summit.

== Cooperation ==
Both countries cooperate in many areas including trade, maritime security and the fight against piracy, the blue economy, parliamentary exchanges, exchanges between the chambers of commerce, youth and sports, cultural exchanges, fisheries, exchange of information, exchanges in labour, experts, skills and expertise.

They also have joint ventures in areas such as in tourism and education, where a large number of expat teachers in Seychelles are Kenyan.

In 2015, both countries signed a Double Taxation Agreement. The tax deal will increase business and investment ties between Kenya and Seychelles. The deal will strengthen the business environment for firms from both countries.

== Trade ==
In 2012, trade between Kenya and Seychelles was worth KES. 550 million (US$6 million).

Kenya exported goods worth KES. 183.3 million (US$2 million) to Seychelles. In addition, Seychelles exported goods worth KES. 367 million (US$4 million).

Kenya's main exports to Seychelles include agricultural and medical products.

Seychelles' main exports to Kenya include fish products.

== See also ==
- Foreign relations of Kenya
- Foreign relations of Seychelles
