= National Agricultural and Fisheries Policy =

The National Agricultural and Fisheries Policy was an act of Seychellois law passed in 2002 which was intended to set out the boundaries of fishing policy in the country between 2002 and 2013.

The policy aims toward "the promotion of sustainable and responsible fisheries development and optimising the benefits from this sector for the present and future generations."

The policy focuses principally on the promotion of sustainable exploitation in fishing practices, and a degree of responsibility for fishing in the islands whilst providing for food, employment, income, and foreign revenue.
