= Seychelles national rugby union team =

The Seychelles national rugby union team represents the Seychelles in international rugby union. The nation have yet to play in a Rugby World Cup tournament.

The national ground has an unusual distinction: it is formed from ground flattened from a massive landslide caused by a heavy rain from a cyclone.
