= Whaling in Seychelles =

Commercial hunting of whales in Seychelles

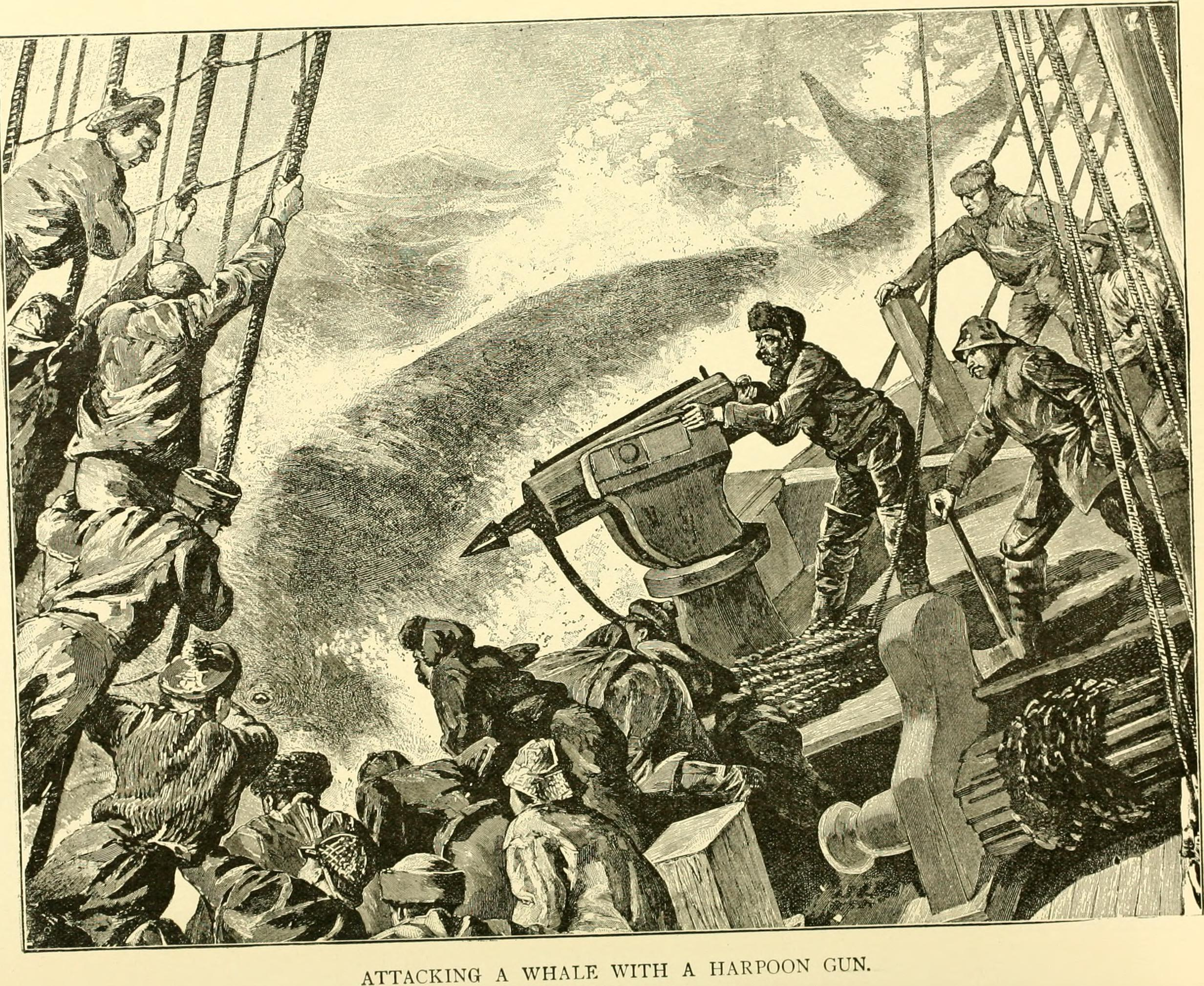
Whale hunting in the Seychelles; 1903

Whaling in Seychelles was established in the early 19th century, coming largely to a close by 1915 due to declining prices for sperm whale oil, as well as the lack of materials and freight congestion due to the onset of World War I. The primary quarry, sperm whales, were generally caught near Bird and Denis Islands, and towed to a whaling station on Saint Anne.

== Turn against whaling ==
In 1979, Seychelles, represented at the International Whaling Commission by author Lyall Watson, took a surprising step in championing the creation of Indian Ocean Whale Sanctuary. Japan, displeased at the Seychelles opposition to whaling in the nation's waters, exerted political pressure, including offers of an aid package to the nation, however the Seychelles maintained its opposition.
