= Seychellois units of measurement =

Units of measurement used in Seychelles

Several units of measurement were used in Seychelles to measure quantities like, for example, capacity. The metric system has been compulsory in Seychelles (and adopted since 1880). Before metric adoption, old French, British and some additional units were used.

== System before metric system ==
Units from old French and British systems, were used before metrication.

=== Capacity ===
In addition to old French and British units, following units were used:

1 cash = 227.11 L

1 velt = 1/30 cash.
