= Slavery in Seychelles =

Slavery in Seychelles existed until its final abolition in 1835. Slaves were brought to the Seychelles when the island was first populated by French planters and their slaves from Mauritius. The British banned the slave trade on the island when it became British territory in 1815, and slavery itself was abolished twenty years later.

== History ==
The Seychelles was uninhabited when it was annexed by France in 1756, and inhabited in 1770 by French planters and their slaves by the French colony of Mauritius.

Slave traders from Madagascar - Sakalava or Arabs - bought slaves from slavers in the Swahili coast or Portuguese Mozambique and stopped at the Seychelles for supplies before shipping the slaves to the slave markets of Mauritius, Réunion and India.

When the Revolutionary Government of Paris abolished slavery in 1794, the French colonies in the Indian Ocean - Mauritius, Réunion and the Seychelles - all refused to enforce the law, and slavery was reintroduced by Napoleon in 1802.

Britain occupied the Seychelles in April 1811, and the island officially became a British colony in 1815. British law had prohibited the slave trade in 1807, and this law was enforced in the Seychelles when the island became British territory, legally outlawing open slave trade. However, slave traders caught by the British often managed to circumvent the law by claiming that the slaves they shipped from East Africa were not free people recently enslaved and victims of slave trade, but rather people who had been born as slaves and were simply being moved by their owners, which made it legally difficult for the British to interfere.

Slaves in the Seychelles were placed in four broad categories. Firstly there were the Creoles (the largest group), those of mixed African and European blood who were brought from Mauritius and had children born on the island; they were often regarded as superior in intellect.

=== Abolition ===
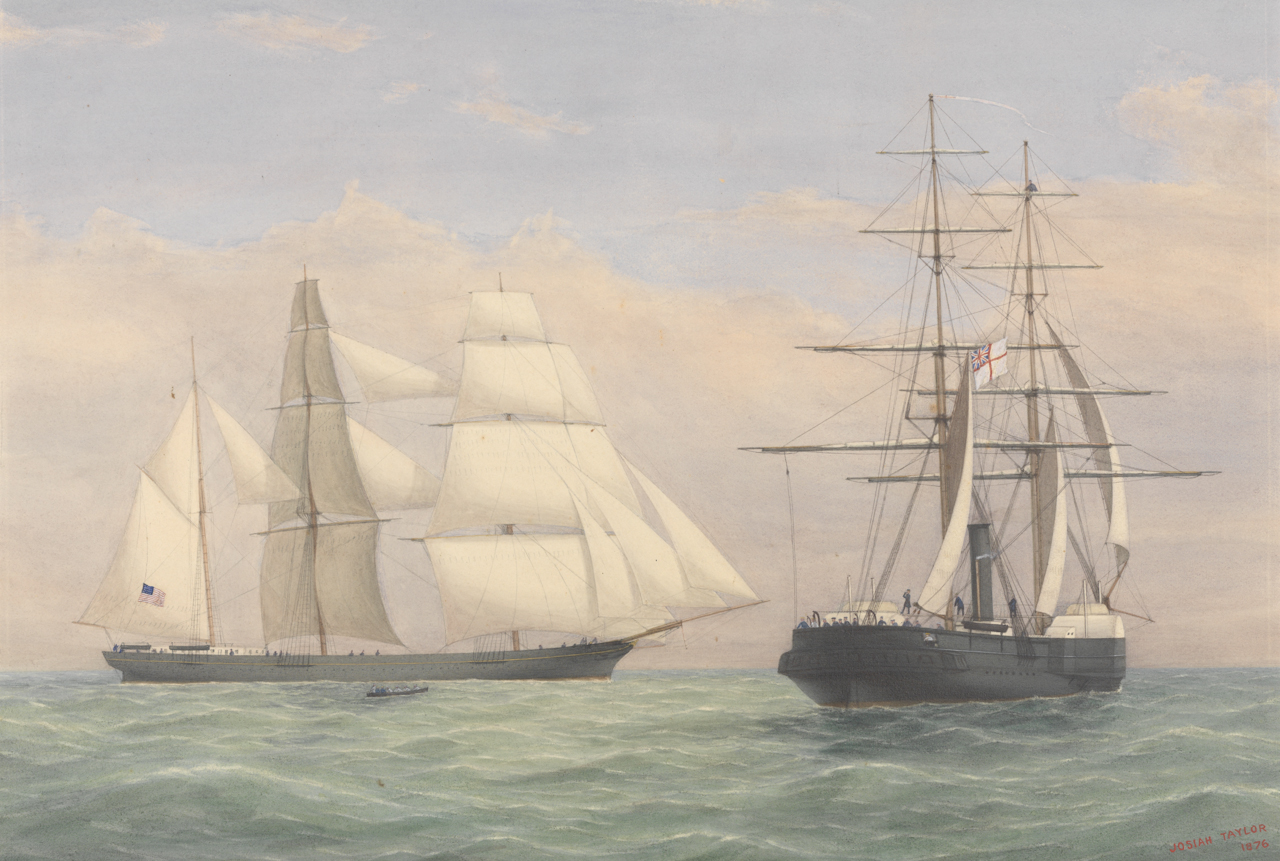
HMS Pluto interdicts the slave ship Orion, under the African Blockade, in 1859

The Anti-Slavery movement led by William Wilberforce grew in power in the early 19th century. Britain finally outlawed slavery itself on the Seychelles in 1835 on the condition that the slaves continued to work for their former enslavers for a transition period of six years.

At this date, there were 6521 slaves on the Seychelles: 3924 from Mozambique, 2231 Creoles (born on the Seychelles or Mauritius), 282 from Madagascar, 28 from India, 3 from Malaya, and 43 of unknown origin.

The civil administrator at the time, Mylius recalled that on Emancipation Day on February 11 the freed slaves responded with "peaceable demonstrations of joy".

Subsequent to the emancipation of local peoples, many "liberated Africans" came to settle in the Seychelles. The Royal Navy and its Blockade of Africa, interdicted slave ships, arresting crews and freeing its slaves. Colonial records indicated 2,667 emancipated people were settled on the islands between 1861and 1875.

On June 20, 1897, many of these liberated people participated in celebrations of the Diamond Jubilee of Queen Victoria in the capital city. The colonial administrator, H. Cockburn-Stewart, recounted the events of the afternoon of jubilee day:

"...the group of Africans made a spontaneous procession to Government House. They arranged themselves in groups, each carrying a flag with the name of their African tribe, all of which were preceded by a large Union Jack on which was printed the words “The Flag that sets us free.” Once they were gathered, a translated address, having been dictated in Créole, was read in English: We members of the different tribes of Africans living in the Seychelles, take the occasion of the Diamond Jubilee of Queen Victoria to express to you—Her Representative in these Islands our thanks for all that She and England have done for us."
