= Montagne Glacis Important Bird Area =

Coordinates: 04°34′S 55°27′E

The Montagne Glacis Important Bird Area lies on the slopes of the highest mountain on the northern cape of the island of Mahé in the Seychelles archipelago of the western Indian Ocean.

== Description ==
The Important Bird Area (IBA) comprises a tract of 20 ha of dense shrubland and rocky areas with caves and large boulders at an altitude of 250–458 m. The vegetation is dominated by exotic plants, principally Cinnamomum verum, Tabebuia pallida and Chrysobalanus icaco. Scattered trees include Sandoricum indicum, Falcataria moluccana (= Paraserianthes falcataria) and Pterocarpus indicus, with some endemics such as Phoenicophorium borsigianum, Deckenia nobilis and Paragenipa wrightii. It was exploited for cinnamon, timber and firewood until the late 20th century. The site has been identified as an IBA by BirdLife International because it supports populations of Seychelles kestrels, Seychelles blue pigeons, Seychelles swiftlets, Seychelles bulbuls and Seychelles sunbirds. The site also supports small numbers of Seychelles’ endemic reptiles and amphibians.
