= Seychelles–Tanzania Maritime Boundary Agreement =

Agreement between the Government of the United Republic of Tanzania and the Government of the Republic of Seychelles on the Delimitation of the Maritime Boundary of the Exclusive Economic Zone and Continental Shelf
- Type: Boundary delimitation
- Signed: 23 January 2002
- Location: Victoria, Seychelles
- Effective: 23 January 2002
- Parties: Seychelles; Tanzania
- Depositary: United Nations Secretariat
- Languages: English; French

The Seychelles–Tanzania Maritime Boundary Agreement is a 2002 treaty between Seychelles and Tanzania which delimits the maritime boundary between the two countries.

The agreement was signed in Victoria, Seychelles on 23 January 2002. The boundary set out by the text of the treaty is a relatively short 17 nautical miles long. It consists of nine straight-line maritime segments defined by ten individual coordinate points. The precision of the treaty is unusual, with the boundary being defined to the nearest three millimetres of the Earth's surface (to the fourth decimal place of one second of the latitude and longitude coordinates). Only one other maritime boundary is defined as precisely—the Iraq–Kuwait maritime boundary, which was defined in 1993 by the United Nations Boundary Demarcation Committee. The agreed-to boundary is an approximate equidistant line between the two countries. The two countries had been negotiating their maritime boundary since 1989.

The treaty came into force on the day of signature. The full name of the treaty is Agreement between the Government of the United Republic of Tanzania and the Government of the Republic of Seychelles on the Delimitation of the Maritime Boundary of the Exclusive Economic Zone and Continental Shelf.
