= 1992 Seychellois constitutional referendum =

15 November 1992
- Do you approve the draft Constitution?
- Outcome: Proposal failed as 60% threshold not reached

Results
Choice	Votes	%
Yes	21,965	54.61%
No	18,255	45.39%
Valid votes	40,220	98.33%
Invalid or blank votes	684	1.67%
Total votes	40,904	100.00%
Registered voters/turnout	49,975	81.85%

A constitutional referendum was held in Seychelles on 15 November 1992. Although the proposed new constitution received the support of 54.6% of voters, it failed to pass the 60% threshold required for adoption. Subsequently, a second constitutional commission was created and a second draft put to a referendum the following year.

== Background ==
A constitution was drafted by a commission elected earlier in 1992. It provided for a presidential system, with presidents limited to three terms of five years. Half of the National Assembly would be elected proportionally based on the results of presidential elections, whilst amendments to the constitution would require a referendum, with changes to some articles requiring a three-fifths majority to be approved.

== Results ==
Voters were asked the question "Do you approve the draft Constitution?"

Choice	Votes	%
For	21,965	54.61
Against	18,255	45.39
Invalid/blank votes	684	–
Total	40,904	100
Registered voters/turnout	49,975	81.85
Source: Direct Democracy
