= Cricket in Seychelles =

Cricket in Seychelles is of a low level, with national sports in Seychelles focusing more on water sports, rugby union and football. Nevertheless, the Seychelles Cricket Association which oversees cricket in Seychelles is an affiliate member of the International Cricket Council and has been since 2010.

== History of cricket in the Seychelles ==
The current Seychelles cricket team played its first ever match in August 2000, against a Rest of the World XI, winning comprehensively, and prompting hope that the sport would gain a greater foothold. The team toured India later that year, but were defeated by Maurindia Cricket Club. The game nevertheless grew, with the Seychelles featuring ten teams by June 2010, including women's and veteran's teams. Thus, they qualified for affiliate membership of the ICC, for which they applied that year. They also ran their inaugural domestic junior competition. They were awarded the membership in July, and in August announced the construction of their first international stadium. In February 2011 their team commenced a campaign to qualify for the 2012 ICC World Twenty20.
