= 1993 Seychellois constitutional referendum =

- 18 June 1993

New constitution
Yes	73.90%
No	24.00%
Informal	2.10%

A constitutional referendum was held in Seychelles on 18 June 1993, following the failure of a referendum the previous year to pass the 60% threshold required. After the new constitution had been redrafted, it was put to a public vote for a second time, receiving the approval of 73.6% of voters.

== Results ==
Choice	Votes	%
For		73.9
Against		24.1
Total		100
Source: African Elections Database
