= Telecommunications in Seychelles =

In the Seychelles, local and international telecommunications lines are operated by Cable & Wireless. In 1997 there were around 11,000 telephone lines and in excess of 20,000 telephones, meaning that over half of the population have a home telephone.

The FEBA Seychelles station was decommissioned at the end of March 2003, and short wave broadcasts were transferred to other stations, many in the former Soviet Union.

== Internet and telecommunications ==
The Internet was introduced in the Seychelles by Atlas Seychelles Ltd, a joint venture between the three leading computer companies, Victoria Computer Services (Proprietary) Ltd, Space 95 and MBM Seychelles Ltd, in September 1996. In 2000 there were approximately 2000 Internet subscribers in the islands. 60% are private or home users and 40% business of which 30% is government and 70% other businesses. There are three Internet service providers in Seychelles: Atlas, Intelvision and Kokonet.

In 2009, following the conviction of the owners of The Pirate Bay for copyright infringement, the popular BitTorrent site was sold to a Seychelles-based company called Reservella Ltd.

In 2012, the 1,930-km Seychelles East Africa System (SEAS) submarine cable landed at Beau Vallon, on the island of Mahé connecting the Seychelles with Tanzania. The SEAS cable is initially equipped at 20 Gbit/s with an ultimate design capacity of 320 Gbit/s.
