= Seychelles community in the EU =

The Seychelles Community in the European Union is composed of former citizens of the Seychelles who now live in the European Union (EU).

The Seychelles (Isle de Séchelles) were part of the French Empire from 1770 until 1814. The islands were transferred to Great Britain under the Treaty of Paris in 1814. The Seychelles islands were captured and freed several times during the French Revolution and the Napoleonic Wars.

They are descendants of French, British, and other European, Creole, Chinese, Indian and African. Like the French colonists of North Africa, they are called Pieds-Noirs in France, French-speaking Belgium, Luxembourg, French-speaking Switzerland, Andorra and Monaco.

They consist of the descendants of French people dissatisfied with British colonial rule. Many Seychelles citizens migrated to Europe during and after the Second World War. Seychellois students sent to study in Britain formed the first Seychelles Student Association.

== Origins of the diaspora ==
There was a modest Seychellois community in Kenya, Tanganyika, Uganda, Zanzibar, Congo and Rhodesia who were compelled to leave after independence of those countries. They migrated mostly to Britain, Canada and Australia.

Seychelles nationals migrated to Britain under a special colonial work quota agreement because of the economic situation in Seychelles; many worked in catering, hotels and hospitals. A large number went to Italy. At this time, a program was set up to recruit young Seychellois for the British Army.

They also have a pan-European organisation, through which their affairs are looked after by leading families and unofficially elected representatives. They have a portal where some information and history can be researched.

Under the Schengen agreement, Seychelles nationals do not require visas to visit or enter the EU and are allowed to remain up to six months. It is yet to become official.

== Exodus ==
The French Wars of Religion began with a massacre at Vassy on 1 March 1562, when 23 Huguenots (some sympathetic sources say hundreds of them) were killed, and about 200 were wounded.

The Huguenots transformed themselves into a definitive political movement thereafter. Protestant preachers rallied an army and cavalry, which came under the leadership of Admiral Gaspard de Coligny. Henry of Navarre and the House of Bourbon allied themselves with the Huguenots. This added wealth and holdings to the Protestant strength, which at its height grew to sixty fortified cities, and posed a serious threat to the Catholic crown and Paris over the next three decades.

Protestantism spread throughout France in the 16th century and led to civil wars. Henry IV, of the Bourbon dynasty, issued the Edict of Nantes (1598), granting religious tolerance to the Huguenots.

They were forced into exile and fled, mainly to Britain and North America. A large community found their way to South Africa, Mauritius, Réunion and thence to Seychelles.

== Historic exodus to Europe ==
The Algeria debacle was a significant event for the Seychelles Planters Association. France, under the Monarchy, the French Revolution, then the French First Republic, had not treated them well. Algeria proximity to Seychelles – the Indian Ocean, the Suez Canal issues. The First and Second World War epoch, Colonial Britain, the ensuing economic and political development.

Then came the East African Independence, followed by the Zanzibar revolution. In Rhodesia the efforts and attempts by the White minority Settlers to have and force a Unilateral government. All those in Colonial Seychelles together with their European expatriate friends, who watched and monitored events with trepidation – it was a matter of time and they would be next.

Over the past 25 years, the EU community has presented the issues and reasons why those that had formed the Planters Association – Grand Blanc had wanted to charter, plan a different course of history for Seychelles then under British Colonial Rule 1963. Having failed they all mostly knew they were in the process of losing 150 years of hard work and toil and they would probably lose their lives too. Those who had the means, transferred their money abroad.

For most and the vast majority, the events of 5 June 1977 coup d'état which will be remembered in history. The establishment of a One Party system and abolition of opposition, imprisonment, deportation and confiscation of Private properties, land, etc. All those who had to flee for their lives and seek exile and refuge in Europe. The attitude of the French, British and other European governments and the media changed. During the next 15 years, from 1977 to 1991, they lived a life of sheer suffering, racial oppression, bitter hardship in diaspora and embitterment. Many of the old families who were forced to leave Seychelles never returned.

== The formation of a distinctive Seychelles Community ==
The formation of a distinctive Seychelles community in Europe began 30 years ago shortly after 5 June revolution in 1977, and the historic and important events which followed. There was already a group of Seychellois in Britain as Seychelles had been a British colony, who had adapted to the British colonial system and way of life, language, and religion, having the means to migrate for various reason, mostly economic.

The next most important category were economic migrants of the 1960s who, as was the practice with other British colonies, were allowed to emigrate to the UK to work in various sectors of the British economy. A similar program in Italy made it possible for a number of Seychelles nationals, mostly of Creole black descent, to go and work in Italy and become citizens.

Another distinctive group, with their very cultural uniqueness were the many families of Seychelles origin who had gone to work and live in East Africa, Kenya, Tanganyika, Uganda and Zanzibar under Britain colonial rule and Seychelles proximity. After the coming of independence to East African countries from the 1950s they were forced to migrate to Britain. They are known as the Kenya born and East African Seychelles. They also influenced events and affairs at Home.

Families had been returning to France between 1900 and 1976, mostly because of the British colonial practice, favouritism and economic reasons. There were issues related also to the 1914 and 1944 wars. They were first, second or third generation French colonial descent and so were able to integrate easily, unlike the situation in Algeria where emigrants from Seychelles were confronted by the Native Algerian population. They maintained contact with families and acquaintances in Seychelles, Reunion, Mauritius and Madagascar, East Africa and had their distinctive circles. They also exerted their distinctive French colonial influence on Seychelles and affairs of the Indian Ocean region – South Africa, Australia and India. They maintained contacts with families in Canada, and the United States.

There were other small groups of Seychelles families of either French, mixed blood creole in most part of Europe – Scandinavia.

The community has started working for funds to collect statistics, enrolled the help of voluntary organisations in Europe to address the issues with poor response.

The events of 5 June 1977 radically changed how they had lived and functioned till then. In spite of the significant Seychelles colonial history, various events such as the independence of India, the Suez Crisis, crises in former Somali, the Mau Mau Uprising, revolution in Congo, East Africa independence, the bloody revolution in Zanzibar, and Rhodesian independence, residents of Seychelles had not expected it to happen in Seychelles. The shock that engulfed not only Seychelles, also affected deeply the groups, communities and families in Europe, both the pro and con groups.

This was followed by the first government in Exile of the Seychelles headed by Sir James Mancham and his former Cabinet Ministers which was supported by Britain, US, France, South Africa, Australia, Israel and Kenya. The media coverage and attention Seychelles received. Communities in Britain, France, Germany, Belgium, the Netherlands and Italy have their fair share of oppression, exclusion, race motivated attack, persecutions, and has drawn strength from North Africa and Ireland.

In Seychelles after the events of 5 June 1977, the very important exodus of Seychelles families had begun, as those who opposed FA Rene were deported. Among the most important challenges was basic: find housing, food and other basic needs such as education or employment. Additionally, however, there was the constant fear of the situation in Seychelles and those involved making life very difficult for those who opposed or had opposed FA Rene government.

In 1978, Seychelles exiles in South Africa, acting in behalf of ex-president James Mancham, discussed with South African Government officials launching a coup d'état against the new president France-Albert René. The military option had been decided in Washington, D.C., after concerns for United States access to its new military base in Diego Garcia island, and the determination that René was not corruptible in favour of the Americans.[2][3]

Associates of Mancham contacted Mike Hoare, then in South Africa as a civilian resident, to fight alongside fifty-three other mercenary soldiers, including South African special forces (Recces), former Rhodesian soldiers, and ex-Congo mercenaries[4]. Hoare agreed to fight for Mancham.

After the failed attempted coup of Mike Hoare, the Seychelles exiles made up of a number of leading Seychelles nationals formed the first important opposition party in exile namely MPR and SNM under the leadership of Mr Gérard Hoarau, another government in exile was formed – to become the principal opposition force and voice representing the Seychelles to the British and international media attention and involvement. Important issues and events included the Cold War, Seychelles' strategic position in the Indian Ocean, the Eastern Bloc involvement, China, OAU, the USSR, the COMECON – Warsaw Pact, Arab State, Cuba and Latin America.

1981 Failed coup in Seychelles led by Mike Hoare, the Italian Secret Service involvement, US Central Intelligence Agency, aspect of the France Secret Service DGSE, involvement – our community.

A third government in exile was put together involving former Cabinet ministers, Executives of MPR/SNM and other exile factions. It also involved France leading French mercenary – Bod Denard They later would form the leadership of a successful peaceful exile/refugee return program – SIROP.

These international issues and events caused the former President of Seychelles, Sir James Mancham – his ministers, the Leader of opposition Mr Gérard Hoarau and the MPR/SNM executive to call for the deposing of FA Rene government. It was decided after consultation with the European continental community, UN agency and other caritative, voluntary agencies to consider very importantly to building long-term grass root structures and supporting bodies for our community in EU. A number of exile factions and long established community members had endeavoured to establish such working body and structures.

A proposal was put forth to the United Nations and other leading international institutions and governments, based on the Seychellois community's contribution to Europe, for the EU to assist in rebuilding Seychelles and establish NGO in Seychelles.

The most important was UKSCA, with a charity registration and supported by several London Councils. It became the first Seychelles NGO in EU to build a network with London's ethnic and exile communities and emphasised the role of the Seychelles exile political parties. It became involved in local, national and international political issues of interest to the Seychelles community. This approach was expanded across the EU. The recognitions of the Seychelles community in EU began to acquire and good will upon which it implemented the SIROP – CDU, Alliance, DP, SNP, SNM exile return program. This radically changed the way the community would be regarded in the EU by the public, the news media and relevant institutions. A pan European organisation was also chartered for the future of our EU community in the eventuality that most of the Leadership return to Seychelles and the future of the community in the EU – named FECAS ECSVS. The community had studied closely other communities with similar interests, cultural background, history.

Given the colonial life it had had, and its ancestors, the community worked to include the church in its work and community across the EU. This was not an easy task, as it had to meet and discuss with Seychelles individuals across the community, learn to listen their advice, aspiration and needs. It also learned how other communities worked to establish a national identity, whether the Mauritius, the Greek, Zanzibar – Ismaili, Lebanese, the Irish, the Jews, the Armenians, the Turks and several communities from former COMECON, among these the Polish community. In France the excellent rapprochement with the many North African communities of Maghreb, and importantly the former Algerian colony, the Harkis, Madagascar, and Comores.

== Important influential role of EU ==
The impact of the Seychelles community is widespread, despite clashes until as late as 1985.

This was divided into five categories:

- Pro-British, Commonwealth and their institutions, military alliance.
- French, Francophone and their institutions, military alliance.
- Strong pro-US, Western, capitalist oriented democracy, political system, ideology, values and military alliance.
- Socialist USSR, COMECON, and others sharing the communist ideology, political system, education, economic system, socialist values and military alliance.
- A small minority back in the 1960s and 1970s who had begun to study, court European political ideology, institutions, economic and diplomatic reasoning.

Each of the above had their political, economic and military agendas and interests in the Seychelles, the Indian Ocean strategic issues, who controlled the region and their motives.

In 1979, the small group of Seychelles exiled refugees based on the Continental Europe, who began looking at the Europe role in the distant future to replace the system so divisive to the country's inhabitants. When they approached the SNM, MPR, and SDP leadership in Britain, London they were labelled Nazi/pro-German, Austrian ideological supporters.

There developed important divisions among the exiled refugee community as a result. This group followed their belief that in the course of time and near future: "The Power that would bring greater stability in the affairs of Seychelles in the Indian Ocean region and their European Communities would be Europe and its vast arrays of then Institutions, values, cultures, heritages, belief, science, diplomacy – military resources, experiences, expertise".

Hence the departure from attempts to change Seychelles by military force; instead they worked towards finding economic and political solutions which would underpin the preferred belief, objective and values. Upon such, the SIROP exile/refugee return program was conceived, planned and implemented.

The communities in EU developed engaged in the greater and important working of Europe from 1979 to date, building effective networks. From 1976 to date, the treaties have benefited the EU of today and the Seychelles communities within it. This include the historic Treaty of Lisbon. The measure of success have been due importantly to their French, British European heritage, culture, Christian and institutional connections, values, education, challenges as a Community in EU.

Since the return of multiparty government in 1991 in the Seychelles, the refugee communities in the EU have become pro-active in supporting democracy and strong civic engagement in the Seychelles, the Indian Ocean, the Gulf Region and OAU – African Union, Asia subcontinent, and also cultural exchanges throughout the region.

== The BIOT Diego Garcia issue ==
BIOT and Diego Garcia are a matter of concern to the Seychelles community. The Seychelles exile communities in the EU have worked to build consensus among themselves in relation to the issue.

The past 30 years have seen an increase in the relevancy, importance of our community European heritage. The Seychelles and Diego Garcia communities is governed by laws of EU – the vast majority of members of the community are EU citizens, so it is inevitable that the community is influenced by EU foreign policy and politics.

The Seychelles and exiles elsewhere have come to take over the major and principal responsibilities, rights of French and other European ancestors in addition to the laws, institutions, culture – history will allow. From this prospective we see the problematic in other prospectives. As a part of the European community within the norms of democratic responsibilities and practices, the Seychelles has important responsibilities. In the EU the democratic practice, civil practice is to allow communities influence in the government process by involving them in it.

The Seychelles community in Britain in particular have paid and is paying a price for what was started 40 years ago. The so-called Grand Blanc, plantation owners, members of the Victoria District Council, did not want to entertain the notion at all, for fear of risking their vested economic interest. Unlike the Chagossians they were educated and articulate. They have had three or four generation of colonial British rule. They knew what had taken place in Mauritius, Reunion, the Chagoss Group. They have experienced the exodus they have made from France from 1000AD. It was with those experience they addressed their concern then.

For the past 30 years the Seychelles community in Britain, EU have suffered directly. Officials and their institutions have created a barrier to full participation of the Seychelles community.

There have been four important wars during the past 30 years associated with Diego Garcia. The situation in the EU government excludes its citizen from active democratic participation and due process because of the status – war, military modalities that have been put into place despite its participation. The EU regards the BIOT/Diego Garcia debate as an African Union debate. However, the AU does not function like EU democratic debates. The AU head of state, institutions would have stood to benefit importantly – because we formed part of the original issue.

In Africa today, they are endeavouring to promote our community in EU vis a vis EU laws; the importance of Diego Garcia would have resulted into over flow. They cannot understand this practice by EU lawmakers.

== See also ==
History of Seychelles

== Sources ==
- Seychelles EU Community 1997/98 report, project support NCVO & LVSC-Evlyn Oldfield Unit, editing & copy partly funded by Prof., Dentist José Souyave (distributed from London)
- Ferrari, Dr Maxime; Sunshine and Shadows, former Minister of Development
- Mancham, Sir James R – Seychelles Global Citizen: The Autobiography of the Founding president, ISBN 978-1-55778-887-0
- Julien Durup, History of La Digue. Distributed by Océan Editions www.ocean-editions.fr, ISBN 978-2-916533-87-2.
- United States Department of StateSeychelles
- Julien Durup, - A student of history
- Deryck Scarr, Seychelles Since 1770: History of a Slave and Post-slavery Society
