= Orion Air =

IATA	ICAO	Call sign
–	ORI	ORION AIR
- Founded: 2004
- Ceased operations: 2008

Orion Air was an airline based in Seychelles. The airline ceased operations in 2008.
