= Seychelles Child Development Study =

The Seychelles Child Development Study is a project created in 1986 by the Ministries of Health and Education in Seychelles, in cooperation with the University of Rochester and the University of Ulster. Its goal is to monitor the effects of mercury exposure (primarily low-level exposure from fish consumption) on infants and young children, especially with regard to neurodevelopmental disorders. In the study, hair mercury levels are used as the index of exposure. A number of scientific studies have been produced as a result of this project, which have generally concluded that there is no evidence that methylmercury consumption results in an increased risk of neurodevelopmental disorders, though one article did note that "the association with activity suggests the need for further study of this cohort." In 2011, a joint FAO/World Health Organization committee published a report, which, based on the SCDS, concluded that the health benefits associated with the omega-3 fatty acids in fish outweighed the potential adverse neurological effects of mercury intake from fish.
