= List of rivers of Seychelles =

This is a list of rivers in Seychelles. Whereas some of these rivers are inland, others have an outlet towards the Somali Sea. This list is arranged by island, streams are listed clockwise starting from the north end of the island.

== Mahé ==
- Pointe Conan River
- Rochon River
- Cascade River
- Du Cap River
- Bougainville River
- Caiman River
- Dupuy River
- Barbarons River
