= National Youth Service (Seychelles) =

Seychellois youth service program

National Youth Service NYS
- Founded: 1979
- Dissolved: November 1998
- Headquarters: Victoria, Seychelles
- Ideology: Communism; Marxism-Leninism
- Mother party: Seychelles People's Progressive Front

The National Youth Service (NYS) (French: Service National de la Jeunesse), (Seychellois Creole: Servis Nasional La Zenes) was a youth service program implemented by the government of Seychelles during its time as a one-party state. It was a formerly compulsory service and included traditional educational curriculum, political education and paramilitary training. Criticized by many as an indoctrination scheme, the program was lauded by President France-Albert René as a way to steer disadvantaged youth from bad habits and troubled situations at home and instead forge a body of educated, skilled, and socially-conscious future administrators of Seychelles. The NYS worked closely with the Seychelles People's Progressive Front Youth League.

== History ==
=== Educational program ===
The NYS was founded in 1979 as a mass organization intended to provide education, paramilitary, and sports training for Seychellois youth. Initially intended to be compulsory, the program was almost immediately made voluntary (compulsory attendance deferred to 1984) as a response to youth protests. Education at the facility was intended to provide practical education as well as ideological training, and eventually replace Seychellois College, the closure of which was planned for the mid-1980s. The stated primary goal of the program was to create a new generation of Seychellois youth with a wider variety of skills with which they could contribute to society. Additionally, the program was used to combat youth addiction (particularly alcoholism) and teenage pregnancy, and to encourage healthy habits.

Students in the NYS lived at NYS campuses at Port Launay and Cap Ternay on the northwest coast of Mahé. The campus was made up of houses or dormitories known as "clusters" (where the students lived) and the school area. The campus was divided in two, with male-only and female-only clusters separated. There were nine boys' clusters (from B1 to B9) and nine girls' clusters (from G1 to G9), with each housing approximately 40 students. Education and other activities were mixed-gender. Students wore special brown and beige uniforms with red scarves.

In addition to academic training, the students received practical instruction in gardening, cooking, housekeeping, and livestock raising; one of the aims of the program was to reduce youth unemployment. Academic subjects were often combined with the aforementioned activities to form month-long practicums. Initially, students were expected to produce much of their own food and cook their own meals, though this was impractical and was phased out during the later years of the program. Self-government was practiced through group sessions and committees. After completing their NYS program, students could attend Seychelles Polytechnic (1,600 students in 1991) for preuniversity studies or other training. In 1991 the NYS program was reduced from two years to one year. The total enrollment in that year was 1,394, with roughly equal numbers of boys and girls. Those who left school but did not participate in the NYS could volunteer for a government-administered six-month work program, receiving a training stipend below the minimum wage. The NYS ceased operations in November 1998.

=== Opposition ===
From the time the NYS program was instituted in 1981, it was met with heated opposition and remained highly unpopular among opponents of René's regime. The Seychellois opposition opposed the program on the grounds that it allegedly indoctrinated young adults with the ruling Seychelles People's Progressive Front's socialist ideology and that it rarely allowed its participants to visit their families. Pressure from international organizations forced the government to make the program optional. The NYS campuses were located on Ste. Anne Island, and at Port Launay and Cap Ternay on Mahé island (though the Sainte Anne campus was closed later).

During the early years of the program, students spent the entire period away from home, with parental visits permitted only during designated 12-hour periods twice per month. The number of parental visits and home visits were increased in later years. Many considered the quality of education to be inferior, with the indoctrination in the socialist policies of the SPPF part of the core curriculum during the beginnings of the NYS. Nevertheless, failure to attend the NYS made it difficult to proceed to more advanced study.

Due to the perceived inadequacies of the NYS and/or opposition to the ideology of the regime, many wealthier families in Seychelles sent their children abroad to Europe or Australia for education during this period. Nevertheless, the program was deemed particularly effective for students of poorer backgrounds, and provided skills, education, and safety they were not afforded at home.
