= List of museums in Seychelles =

This is a list of museums in Seychelles.

== List ==
- National Museum of Natural History, Seychelles
- National Cultural Centre, Seychelles
- People's National Party Museum, Seychelles
- Praslin Museum
- Seychelles Natural History Museum
- Seychelles People Defence Forces Museum

== See also ==
- List of museums
