= Plaisance, Seychelles =

Coordinates: 4°39′S 55°27′E

Plaisance
- District

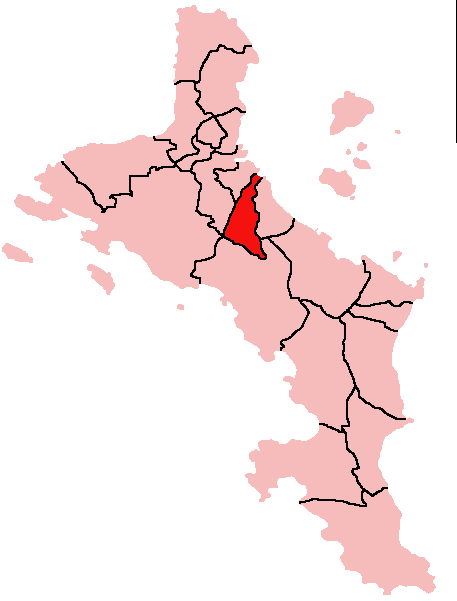
- Location within Mahé Island, Seychelles
- Country: Seychelles

Government
  - District Administrator: Claudette Louise
  - Member of National Assembly: Hon. Richard Labrosse (LDS)

Population (2019 Estimate)
  - Total: 3,974
- Time zone: Seychelles Time

Plaisance (French pronunciation: [plɛzɑ̃s]) is an administrative district of Seychelles located on the island of Mahé.

== See also ==
- Bernard Adonis
