= Electoral Commission of Seychelles =

Government office

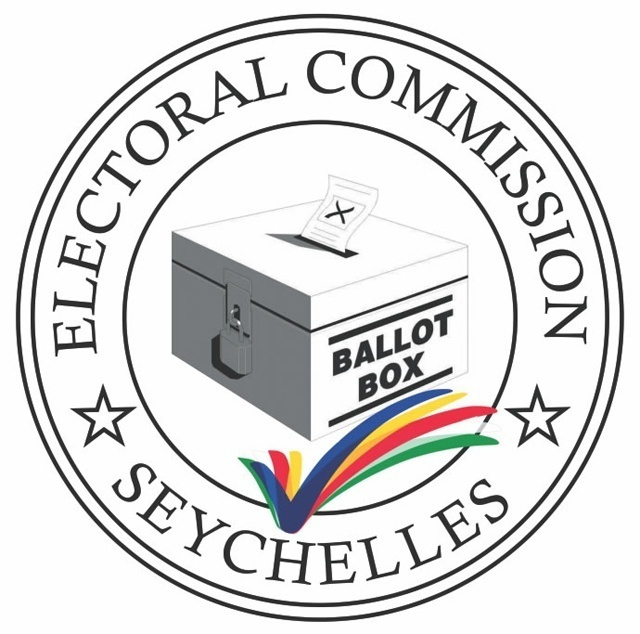
Emblem of the Electoral Commission of Seychelles

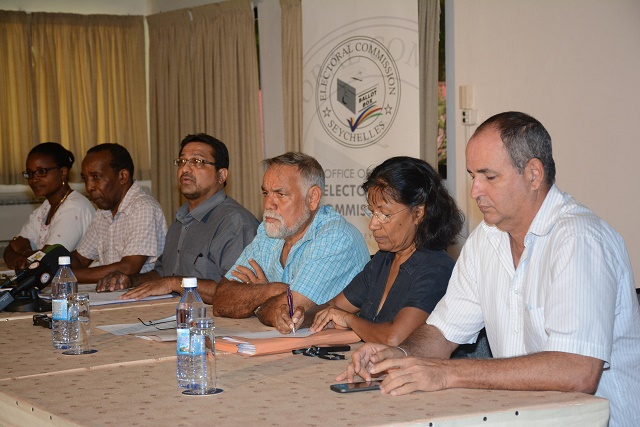
Electoral Commission of Seychelles in October 2015 (Hendrick Gappy, Chairman, is third from the left)

The Electoral Commission of Seychelles is the body that organise, oversee and regulate political elections in Seychelles. Currently headed by Hendrick Gappy, the body is also charged with the responsibilities of registering political parties in Seychelles.
