= Agriculture in Seychelles =

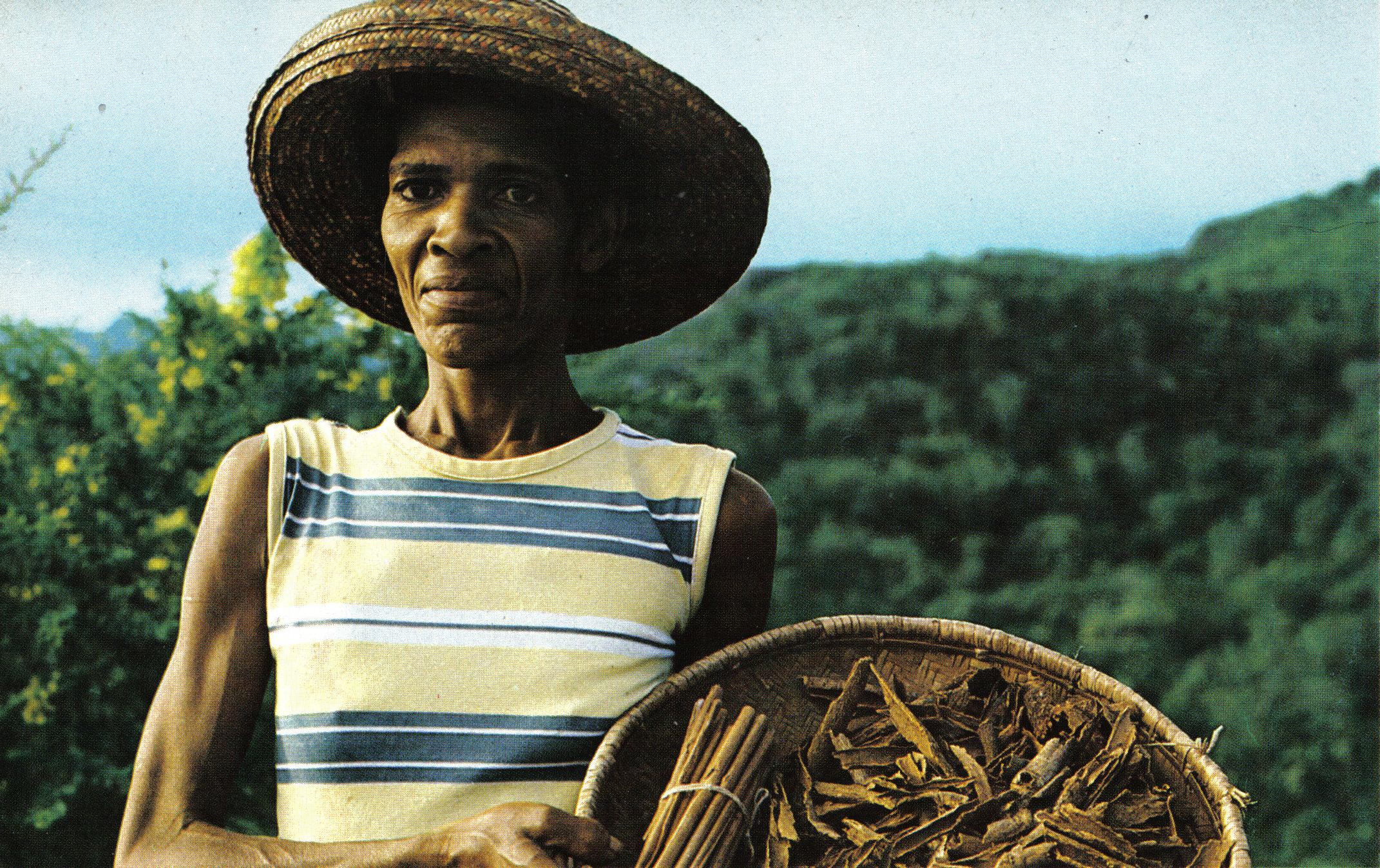
A cinnamon quill maker in Seychelles

Seychelles' Ministry of Agriculture and Marine Resources in 1993 gave up the management of five state-owned farms, which were divided into small plots and leased to individuals. In addition, the agricultural sector consisted of state farms of the Seychelles Agricultural Development Company (Sadeco) and the outer islands managed by the IDC; three other large holdings producing mainly coconuts, cinnamon, and tea; about 250 families engaged in full-time production of foodstuffs; and an estimated 700 families working on a part-time basis. Many households cultivate gardens and raise livestock for home consumption.

The total cultivable area of the islands is only about 400 hectares. Although rainfall is abundant, wet and dry seasons are sharply defined. Better irrigation and drainage systems are needed to improve food crops. The government has taken various measures to reduce dependency on imported foods, including deregulating production and marketing and reducing the trades tax on fertilisers and equipment. As a result, vegetable and fruit production climbed from 505 tons in 1990 to 1,170 tons in 1992. This increase failed to be matched by a commensurate decrease in imports of fruits and vegetables, which reached 3,471 tons in 1992. Local consumption had apparently increased, and substitution between imported and domestic foodstuffs was possible only to a limited degree. In most cases, imported produce is significantly cheaper in spite of air freight, import taxes, and other costs, necessitating a high import markup by the SMB to prevent disruption of domestic production. Neither rice, a dietary staple, nor other grains can be grown on the islands.

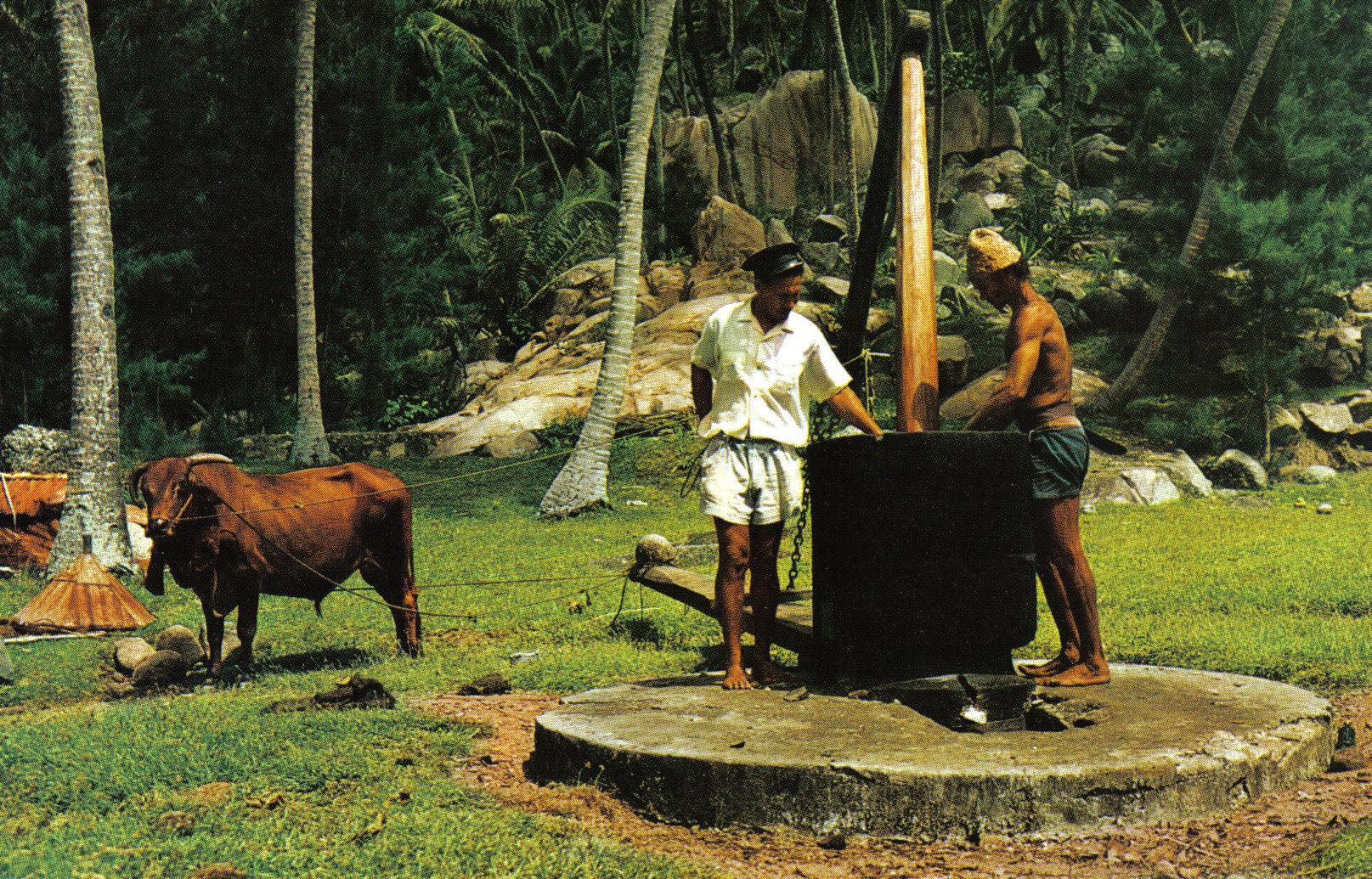
Coconut oil production in Seychelles

The expansion of livestock production is hampered by encroachment of housing and other development on agricultural land as well as by increased labour and animal feed costs. The number of cattle slaughtered in 1992 (329 head) was virtually unchanged from five years earlier. The slaughter of pigs (4,598) was about 45 per cent higher than 1987, and chicken production (439,068) had risen by 60 per cent.

The two traditional export crops of copra (dried coconut meat from which an oil is produced) and cinnamon have declined greatly because of the high cost of production and pressure from low-cost competitors on the international market. Vanilla, formerly important, is produced on a very small scale. Tea grown on the misty slopes of Mahé is a more recent plantation crop, serving mainly the local market.
