= Anse Etoile =

District on Mahé Island, Seychelles

Anse Étoile
- District
- District emblem

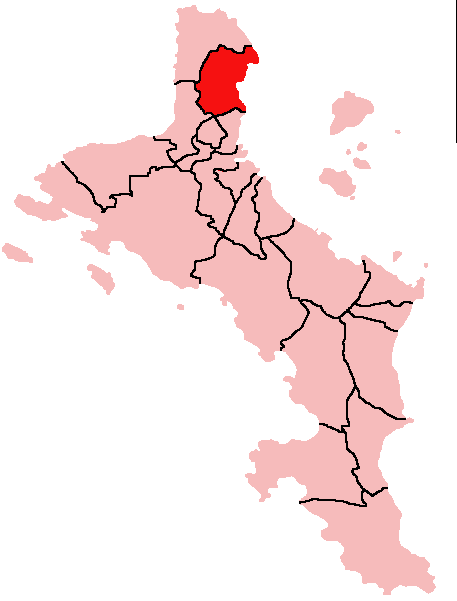
- Location within Mahé Island, Seychelles
- Coordinates: 4°35′S 55°27′E
- Country: Seychelles

Government
  - District Administrator: Jenna Dubingon
  - Member of National Assembly: Hon. Georges Romain (LDS)

Population (2019 estimate)
  - Total: 4,935
- Time zone: UTC+4 (Seychelles Time)

Anse Étoile (French pronunciation: [ɑ̃s‿etwal]) is an administrative district of Seychelles, located on the island of Mahé.
