= Beau Vallon, Seychelles =

Beau Vallon
- District

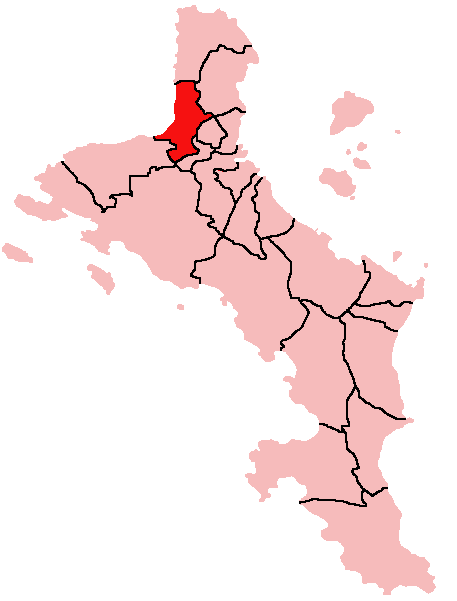
- Location within Mahé Island, Seychelles
- Country: Seychelles

Government
  - District Administrator: Denise Clarisse
  - Member of National Assembly: Hon. John Hoareau (LDS)

Population (2019 Estimate)
  - Total: 4,020
- Time zone: Seychelles Time

Beau Vallon (French pronunciation: [bo valɔ̃]) is a bay on the north western coast of Mahé in the Seychelles. Beau Vallon Beach is well-frequented and is possibly the most popular beach on the island. It is a base for diving and snorkelling due to its clear waters and coral reefs. Beau Vallon has several hotels and restaurants. There are multiple hotels and resorts on the beaches of Beau Vallon.

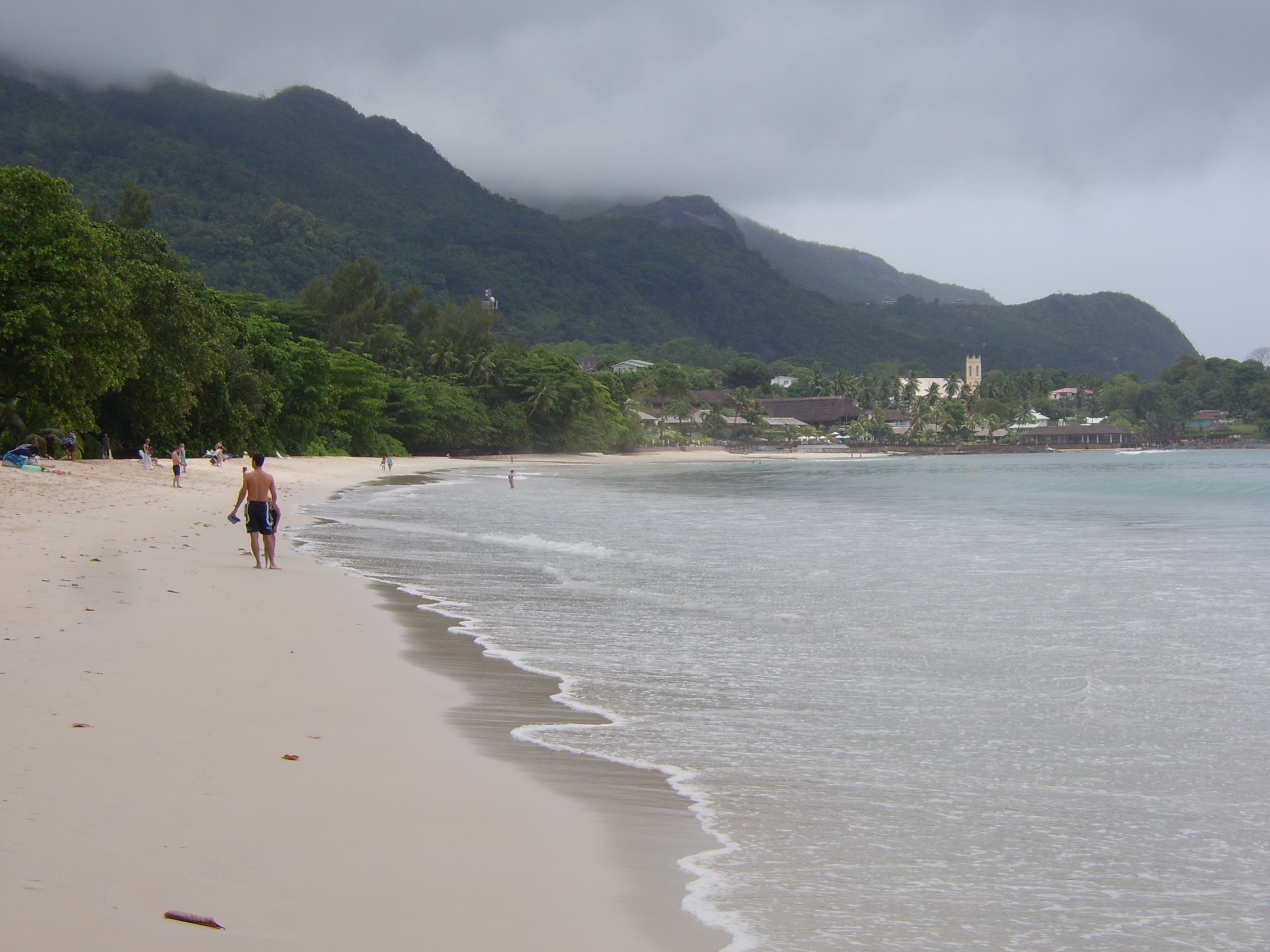
Beau Vallon Beach

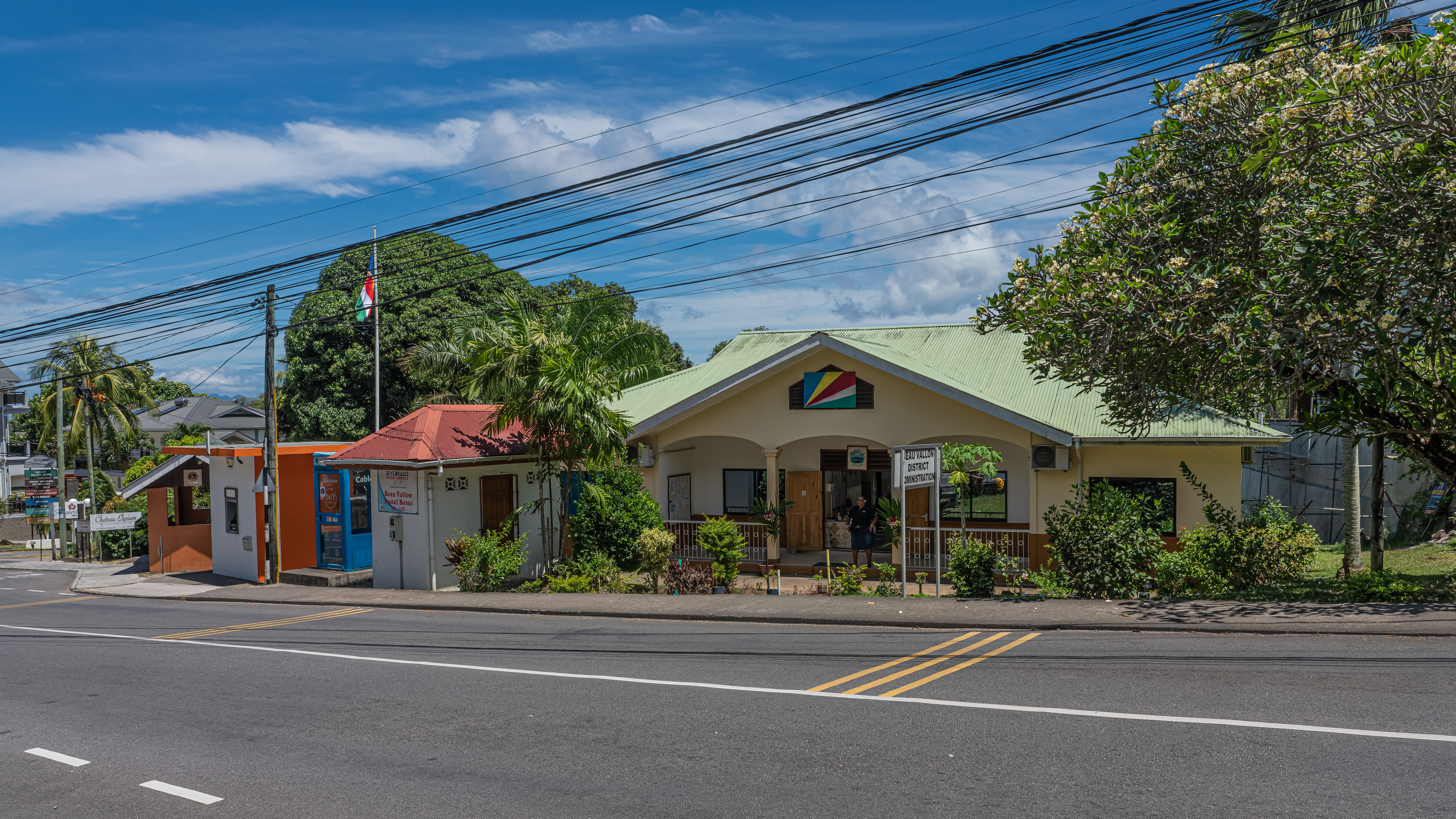
Beau Vallon administration

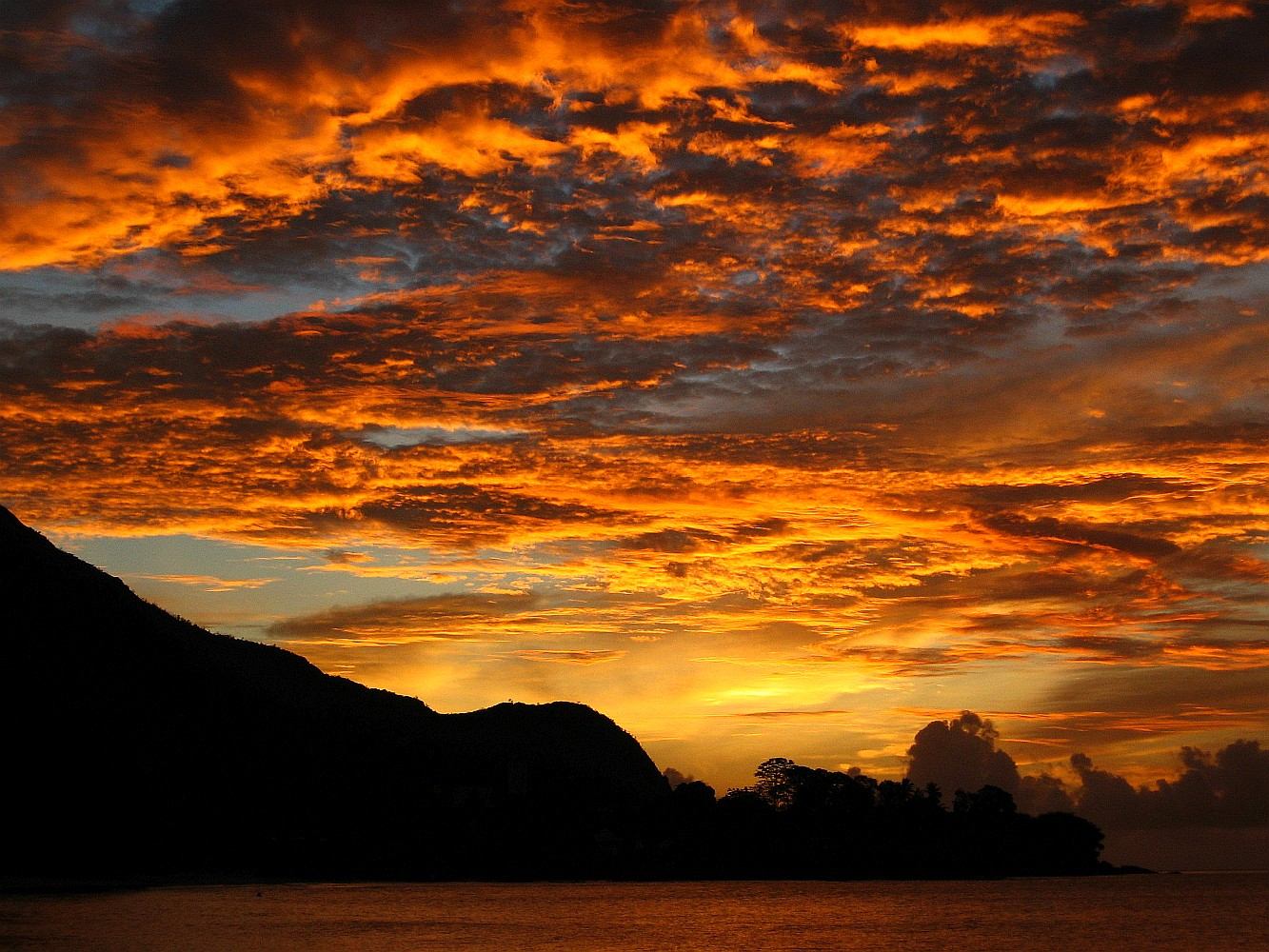
Sunset Over Beau Vallon
