= Anse Royale =

- District

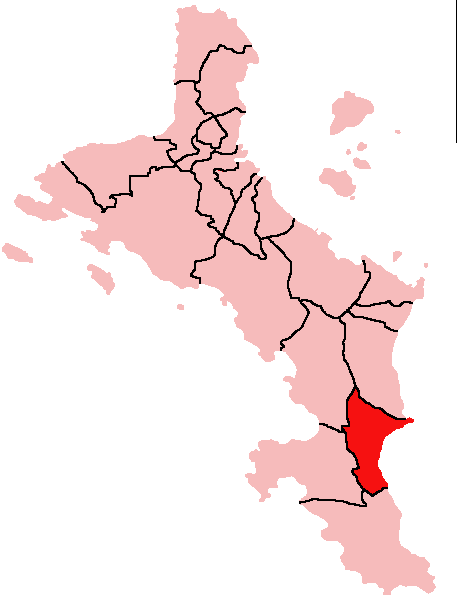
- Location within Mahé island, Seychelles
- Coordinates: 4°44′S 55°31′E
- Country: Seychelles

Government
  - District Administrator: Linette Dodin
  - Member of National Assembly: Hon. Sylvanne Lemiel (PL)

Population (2019 Estimate)
  - Total: 4,665
- Time zone: Seychelles Time

Anse Royale (French pronunciation: [ɑ̃s ʁwajal]) is an administrative district of Seychelles located on the island of Mahé. The Seychelles Polytechnic School of the Humanities is located in this district.

== Gallery ==
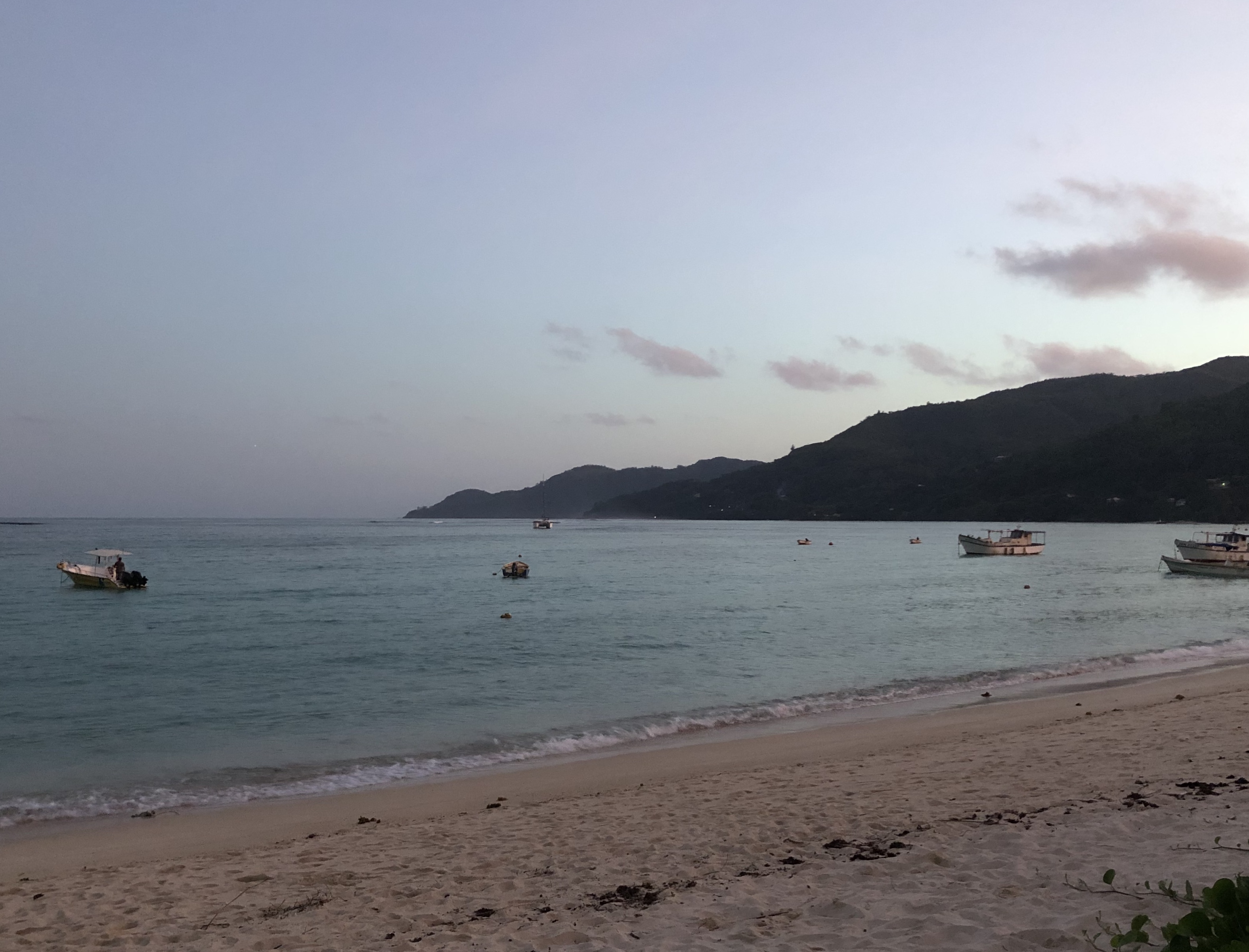
The view facing south from the coast in Anse Royale, overlooking Anse Forbans and Pointe Capucins

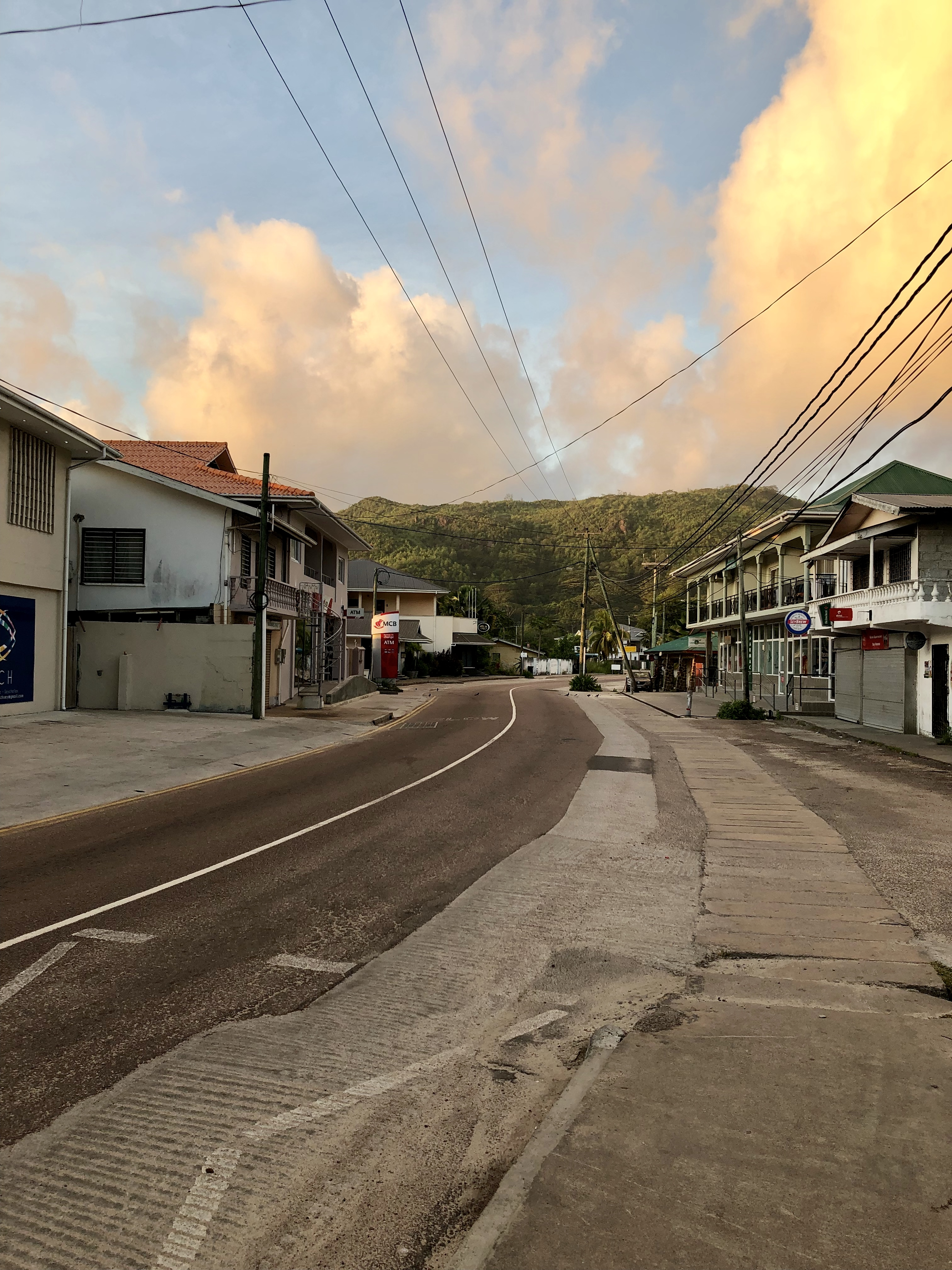
The South Coast Road, as it passes through Anse Royale

== Notable people ==
- Naadir Hassan, Foreign minister.
