= Districts of Seychelles =

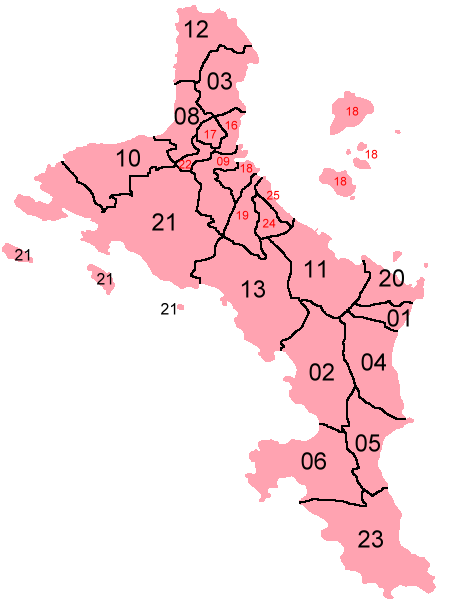
A clickable map of Mahé Island exhibiting its districts.

Seychelles is divided into 26 districts. All but one are located on the Inner Islands; the Outer Islands (Zil Elwannyen Sesel) make up the most recent district. Eight districts make up Greater Victoria, 14 make up the rural part of the main island of Mahé, two make up Praslin, and one makes up La Digue (which includes small surrounding islands and some distant islands like Silhouette, North Island, Denis, Bird).

The capital city of Victoria consists of four districts: English River, Saint Louis, Bel Air, and Mont Fleuri.

Between 1991 and 1993, the original 23 districts were local government units with elected councils. Since then, they have been governed by government-appointed administrators.

In 1998, two new districts (Roche Caiman and Les Mamelles) were created mostly from reclaimed land and from parts of Plaisance. In 2012, another new land reclamation took place, adding Eve Island and Rev Island near the capital Victoria and Bay St. Anne in Praslin, making the area 459 km^{2}. Also, the Outer Islands were given district status by the ministry of tourism.

== Table of districts ==
Nr (Note: The number relates to ISO-Code for districts 01 through 26)	District	Capital	Area		Population	Region
Nr	District	Capital	km^{2}	mi^{2}	Population	Region
**	Mahe Islands	Mahe Islands	163.2	63.0	78,333	
01	Anse aux Pins	Anse Aux Pins	2.2	0.85	3,673	East Mahé
02	Anse Boileau	Anse Boileau	12.0	4.6	4,183	West Mahé
03	Anse Etoile	Anse Etoile	5.8	2.2	5,018	North Mahé
04	Au Cap	La Plaine St. André	8.7	3.4	3,743	East Mahé
05	Anse Royale	Anse Royale	6.6	2.5	3,818	South Mahé
06	Baie Lazare	Baie Lazare	12.1	4.7	3,227	South Mahé
08	Beau Vallon	Beau Vallon	4.3	1.7	4,142	North Mahé
09	Bel Air	Bel Air	4.7	1.8	3,015	Greater Victoria
10	Bel Ombre	Bel Ombre	9.2	3.6	4,163	West Mahé
11	Cascade	Providence	10.4	4.0	4,088	East Mahé
12	Glacis		7.0	2.7	4,157	North Mahé
13	Grand'Anse	Grand'Anse	15.4	5.9	2,842	West Mahé
16	English River	English River	1.7	0.66	4,252	Greater Victoria
17	Mont Buxton	Mont Buxton	1.2	0.46	3,173	Greater Victoria
18	Mont Fleuri	Mont Fleuri	6.1	2.4	3,966	Greater Victoria
19	Plaisance	Plaisance	3.4	1.3	3,690	Greater Victoria
20	Pointe La Rue	Pointe La Rue	3.9	1.5	3,245	East Mahé
21	Port Glaud	Port Glaud	28.7	11.1	2,378	West Mahé
22	Saint Louis	Saint Louis	1.1	0.42	3,436	Greater Victoria
23	Takamaka	Takamaka	14.4	5.6	2,580	South Mahé
24	Les Mamelles	Les Mamelles	1.8	0.69	2,537	Greater Victoria
25	Roche Caïman	Roche Caïman	1.2	0.46	2,893	Greater Victoria
**	Praslin Islands	Praslin Islands	42.2	16.3	7,682	
07	Baie Sainte Anne	Anse Volbert	25.1	9.7	3,626	Inner Islands
14	Grand'Anse Praslin	Grand Anse	14.4	5.6	4,056	Inner Islands
**	La Digue Islands	La Digue Islands	41.8	16.1	3,506	
15	La Digue and Inner Islands	La Passe	41.8	16.1	3,506	Inner Islands
**	Outer Islands	Victoria	211.8	81.8	503	
26	Outer Islands	(Coëtivy)	211.8	81.8	503	Outer Islands
	Seychelles	Victoria	459.0	177.2	90,024	

== See also ==
- ISO 3166-2:SC
