= Anse Boileau =

Coordinates: 4°42′S 55°29′E

- District

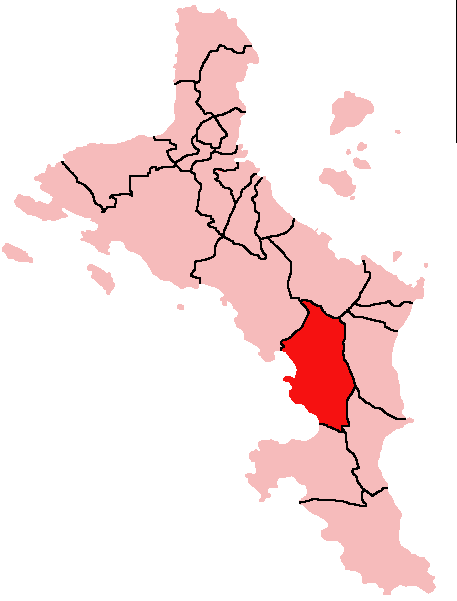
- Location within Seychelles
- Country: Seychelles

Government
  - District Administrator: Valcy Naiken
  - Member of National Assembly: Hon. Phillip Arissol (LDS)

Population (2019 Estimate)
  - Total: 4,093
- Time zone: Seychelles Time

Anse Boileau (French pronunciation: [ɑ̃s bwalo]) is an administrative district on the south of the island of Mahé in the Seychelles. Anse Boileau encapsulates the natural wonders of the Seychelles: it sits at the foot of a steep, green mountain, it is on the shores of the Indian Ocean, and in its midst are streams, mini-forests, creeks, ponds, and an enchanting array of all that defines the Seychellois landscape. It is often described as a fishing village because many of the local residents fish for a living. It has a school, a restaurant, a number of grocery shops, a health centre, and a police station. It is a short distance away from Anse La Mouche, a popular tourist destination. Anse Boileau is so-called because of its many coves.

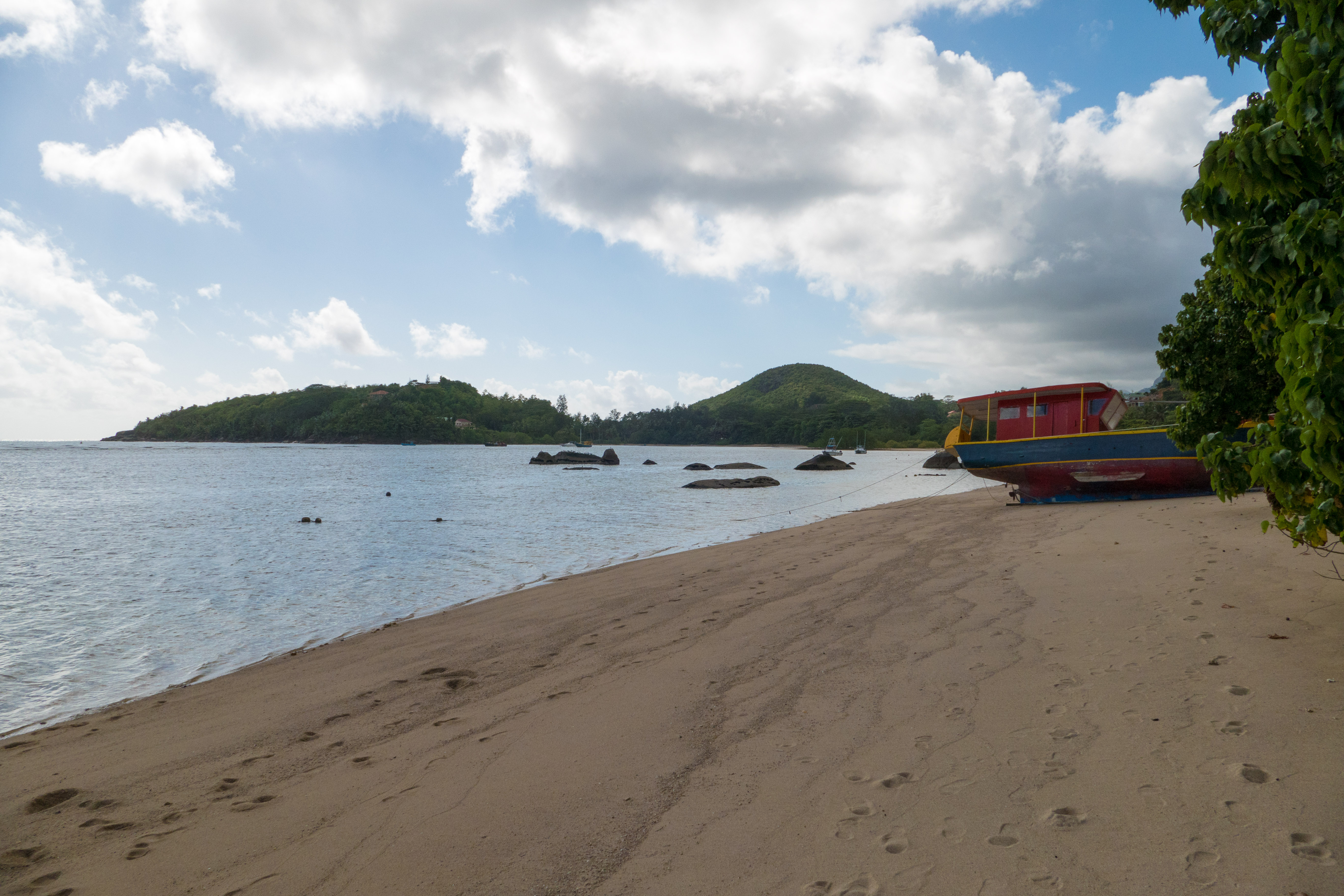
Beach scene in Anse Boileau
