= List of islands of Seychelles =

Overview of the islands of Seychelles

Seychelles, an island country in the Indian Ocean, consists of over 100 islands. Despite the large number of islands, less than half are inhabited, though many are tourist destinations.

	ostrov	area	coastline	altitude	highest point	population	pop. density	large settlement	district	group	sub-group
1	Mahé	155.01	111.30	905	Morne Seychellois	95,000	612.86	Victoria	22 districts	Granitic Seychelles	Mahé Islands
2	Grand Terre Island	114.00	106.65	—	—	0	0.00	—	Outer Islands	Aldabra Group	Aldabra Atoll
3	Praslin	38.00	46.00	367	Mont Azore	7,553	198.76	Baie Sainte Anne	BSA, G'AP	Granitic Seychelles	Praslin Islands
4	Malabar Island	26.50	52.50	—	—	0	0.00	—	Outer Islands	Aldabra Group	Aldabra
5	Silhouette Island	20.10	21.00	751	Mont Dauban	160	7.62	La Passe	La Digue and Inner Islands	Granitic Seychelles	Silhouette
6	Assumption Island	11.60	17.23	32	Southeast Hill	20	1.72	Assumption	Outer Islands	Aldabra Group	Assumption
7	La Digue	10.08	15.40	333	Belle Vue	2,800	277.78	La Passe	La Digue and Inner Islands	Granitic Seychelles	La Digue
8	Coëtivy	9.33	20.40	21	Coëtivy	260	27.87	Coëtivy	Outer Islands	Southern Coral Group	Coëtivy
9	Picard Island	9.29	25.80	16	unnamed dune	12	1.29	La Gigi	Outer Islands	Aldabra Group	Aldabra
10	Astove Island	7.75	—	18	—	2	0.26	Astove	Outer Islands	Aldabra Group	Astove
11	South Farquhar	4.20	14.10	23	—	0	0.00	—	Outer Islands	Farquhar Group	Farquhar Atoll
12	Desroches	4.03	13.10	—	—	100	24.81	Desroches	Outer Islands	Amirante Islands	Desroches
13	North Farquhar	3.54	17.90	12.2	—	20	5.65	Grande Poste	Outer Islands	Farquhar Group	Farquhar Atoll
14	Curieuse	2.93	11.50	172	Mont Curieuse	7	2.39	Park rangers station	Baie Sainte Anne	Granitic Seychelles	Praslin
15	Félicité	2.68	8.22	213	Morne Ramos	20	7.46	La Penice	La Digue and Inner Islands	Granitic Seychelles	La Digue
16	Menai Island	2.47	10.10	12.2	—	0	0.00	Menai	Outer Islands	Aldabra Group	Cosmoledo
17	Ste. Anne Island	2.27	7.11	246	Mount Sainte Anne	40	17.62	Sainte Anne	Mont Fleuri	Granitic Seychelles	Mahé
18	Frégate	2.07	6.35	125	Mount Signal	214	103.38	Frégate village	La Digue and Inner Islands	Granitic Seychelles	Frégate
19	North	2.01	6.66	180	Grand Paloss	152	75.62	North village	La Digue and Inner Islands	Granitic Seychelles	Silhouette
20	Polymnie	1.94	10.40	—	—	0	0.00	—	Outer Islands	Aldabra Group	Aldabra
21	Providence Island	1.72	7.80	—	—	0	0.00	Providence	Outer Islands	Farquhar Group	Providence Atoll
22	Alphonse Island	1.71	5.50	—	—	82	47.95	Alphonse	Outer Islands	Alphonse Group	Alphonse Atoll
23	D'Arros Island	1.71	5.10	3	—	42	24.56	D'Arros	Outer Islands	Amirante Islands	St. Joseph a D'Arros
24	St. Pierre Island	1.64	4.60	16	—	0	0.00	St. Pierre village	Outer Islands	Farquhar Group	St. Pierre
25	Wizard Island	1.60	9.60	17	—	0	0.00	—	Outer Islands	Aldabra Group	Cosmoledo
26	Denis Island	1.40	5.20	—	—	80	57.14	St. Denis	La Digue and Inner Islands	Granitic Seychelles	Northern Coral Group
27	Poivre Sud	1.356	—	—	—	0	0.00	—	Outer Islands	Amirante Islands	Poivre
28	Cerf Island	1.310	5.10	108	Mount Cerf	100	76.34	Cerf	Mont Fleuri	Granitic Seychelles	Mahé
29	Poivre Nord	1.105	—	—	—	8	7.24	Pointe Baleine village	Outer Islands	Amirante Islands	Poivre
30	Cerf Island	1.100	17.00	—	—	0	0.00	—	Outer Islands	Farquhar Group	Providence Atoll
31	St. Joseph Island	1.084	—	—	—	0	0.00	St. Joseph	Outer Islands	Amirante Islands	St. Joseph a D'Arros
32	Perseverance Island (Note: It is artificial island.)	0.990	5.30	5	—	—	—	—	Mahé Islands	Granitic Seychelles	Mahé
33	Marianne Island	0.960	4.50	130	Morne Estel	0	0.00	La Cour	La Digue and Inner Islands	Granitic Seychelles	La Digue
34	Bird Island	0.940	4.46	—	—	38	40.43	Bird Island Village	La Digue and Inner Islands	Granitic Seychelles	Northern Coral Group
35	Grande Soeur	0.780	4.79	113	Morne Soeur	2	2.56	Grande Soeur	La Digue and Inner Islands	Granitic Seychelles	La Digue
36	Thérèse Island	0.762	4.50	164	Thérèse	0	0.00	Thérèse	Port Glaud	Granitic Seychelles	Mahé
37	Aride Island	0.710	4.23	135	Gros la Tête	8	11.27	La Cour	Grand'Anse Praslin	Granitic Seychelles	Praslin
38	Conception Island	0.604	3.50	131	Conception	0	0.00	—	Port Glaud	Granitic Seychelles	Mahé
39	Aurore Island	0.600	3.50	5	—	100	166.67	Aurore	Anse Etoile	Granitic Seychelles	Mahé
40	Port Island	0.587	3.50	—	—	10	17.04	North Point	English River	Granitic Seychelles	Mahé
41	South Coconut Island	0.581	4.26	—	—	0	0.00	—	Outer Islands	Aldabra Group	Aldabra
42	Platte Island	0.578	3.30	—	—	3	5.19	Platte	Outer Islands	Southern Coral Group	Platte Island
43	Eden Island	0.570	5.50	5	—	1,000	1,754.39	Eden	Roche Caiman	Granitic Seychelles	Mahé
44	Marie Louise Island	0.556	3.00	9	—	142	255.40	Marie Louise	Outer Islands	Amirante Islands	Marie Louise a Desnœufs
45	North Coconut Island	0.523	4.40	—	—	0	0.00	—	Outer Islands	Aldabra Group	Aldabra
46	St. François Island	0.470	9.50	—	—	0	0.00	St. François Island	Outer Islands	Alphonse Group	St. François Atoll
47	Desnœufs Island	0.457	2.60	5.5	—	0	0.00	—	Outer Islands	Amirante Islands	Marie Louise a Desnœufs
48	South	0.423	6.50	—	—	0	0.00	—	Outer Islands	Aldabra Group	Cosmoledo
49	Michael Island	0.370	5.57	—	—	0	0.00	—	Outer Islands	Aldabra Group	Aldabra
50	Esprit Island	0.361	2.77	—	—	0	0.00	—	Outer Islands	Aldabra Group	Aldabra
51	Petite Soeur	0.350	3.05	105	Morne Soeur	0	0.00	—	La Digue and Inner Islands	Granitic Seychelles	La Digue
52	Cousin Island	0.340	2.30	69	—	6	17.65	Cousin	Grand'Anse Praslin	Granitic Seychelles	Praslin
53	Goëlettes Island	0.320	2.35	3	—	0	0.00	—	Outer Islands	Farquhar Group	Farquhar Atoll
54	Cousine Island	0.300	2.70	76	—	16	53.33	Cousine East	Grand'Anse Praslin	Granitic Seychelles	Praslin
55	Moustiques Island	0.293	3.10	—	—	0	0.00	—	Outer Islands	Aldabra Group	Aldabra
56	Eve Island	0.290	2.54	1	—	100	344.83	Eve Construction camp	Baie Sainte Anne	Granitic Seychelles	Praslin
57	Grande Polyte	0.277	4.00	—	—	0	0.00	—	Outer Islands	Aldabra Group	Cosmoledo
58	Rémire Island	0.270	2.10	7	—	6	22.22	Rémire	Outer Islands	Amirante Islands	Rémire
59	Long Island	0.230	2.30	90	Mount Pelangi Spa	50	217.39	Long Island	Mont Fleuri	Granitic Seychelles	Mahé
60	Round Island, Praslin	0.200	1.90	75	—	10	50.00	Round	Baie Sainte Anne	Granitic Seychelles	Praslin
61	Romainville Island	0.194	2.40	—	—	2	10.31	Romainville	English River	Granitic Seychelles	Mahé
62	Soleil Island	0.136	1.50	3	—	10	75.53	Soleil camp	Anse-aux-Pins	Granitic Seychelles	Mahé
63	Anonyme Island	0.100	1.45	39	Anonyme	2	20.00	Anonyme	Pointe La Rue	Granitic Seychelles	Mahé
64	Moyenne Island	0.099	1.70	61	Mont Moyenne	1	10.10	Anse Creole Travel Services	Mont Fleuri	Granitic Seychelles	Mahé
65	Mamelles Island	0.060	1.10	42	South Hill	0	0.00	—	Glacis	Granitic Seychelles	Mahé
66	Étoile Cay	0.050	1.00	4.6	—	0	0.00	—	Outer Islands	Amirante Islands	Boudeuse a Étoile Cays
67	Vache Island, Seychelles	0.047	0.90	54	Vache	0	0.00	—	Grand'Anse Mahé	Granitic Seychelles	Mahé
68	L'Islette Island	0.034	0.90	10	L'Islette	0	0.00	L'Islette	Port Glaud	Granitic Seychelles	Mahé
69	North Island	0.030	—	3	—	0	0.00	—	Outer Islands	Amirante Islands	African Banks
70	Boudeuse Cay	0.030	0.70	4.6	—	0	0.00	—	Outer Islands	Amirante Islands	Boudeuse a Étoile Cays
71	Round Island, Mahé	0.027	1.10	26	Mount Round	10	370.37	Round Island	Mont Fleuri	Granitic Seychelles	Mahé
72	Booby Island	0.023	0.60	30	—	0	0.00	—	Grand'Anse Praslin	Granitic Seychelles	Praslin
73	Cachée Island	0.022	0.55	10	—	0	0.00	—	Mont Fleuri	Granitic Seychelles	Mahé
74	Sèche Island	0.020	0.63	30	Beacon Peak	0	0.00	—	Mont Fleuri	Granitic Seychelles	Mahé
75	Wizard Reef	0.020	—	0.10	—	0	0.00	—	Outer Islands	Farquhar Group	Providence Atoll
76	Chauve Souris, Praslin	0.010	0.35	10	—	2	200.00	Chauve Souris	Baie Sainte Anne	Granitic Seychelles	Praslin
77	St. Pierre Island, Praslin	0.010	0.33	10	—	0	0.00	—	Baie Sainte Anne	Granitic Seychelles	Praslin
