= Solar eclipse of January 15, 2010 =

21st-century annular solar eclipse

- Annular eclipse
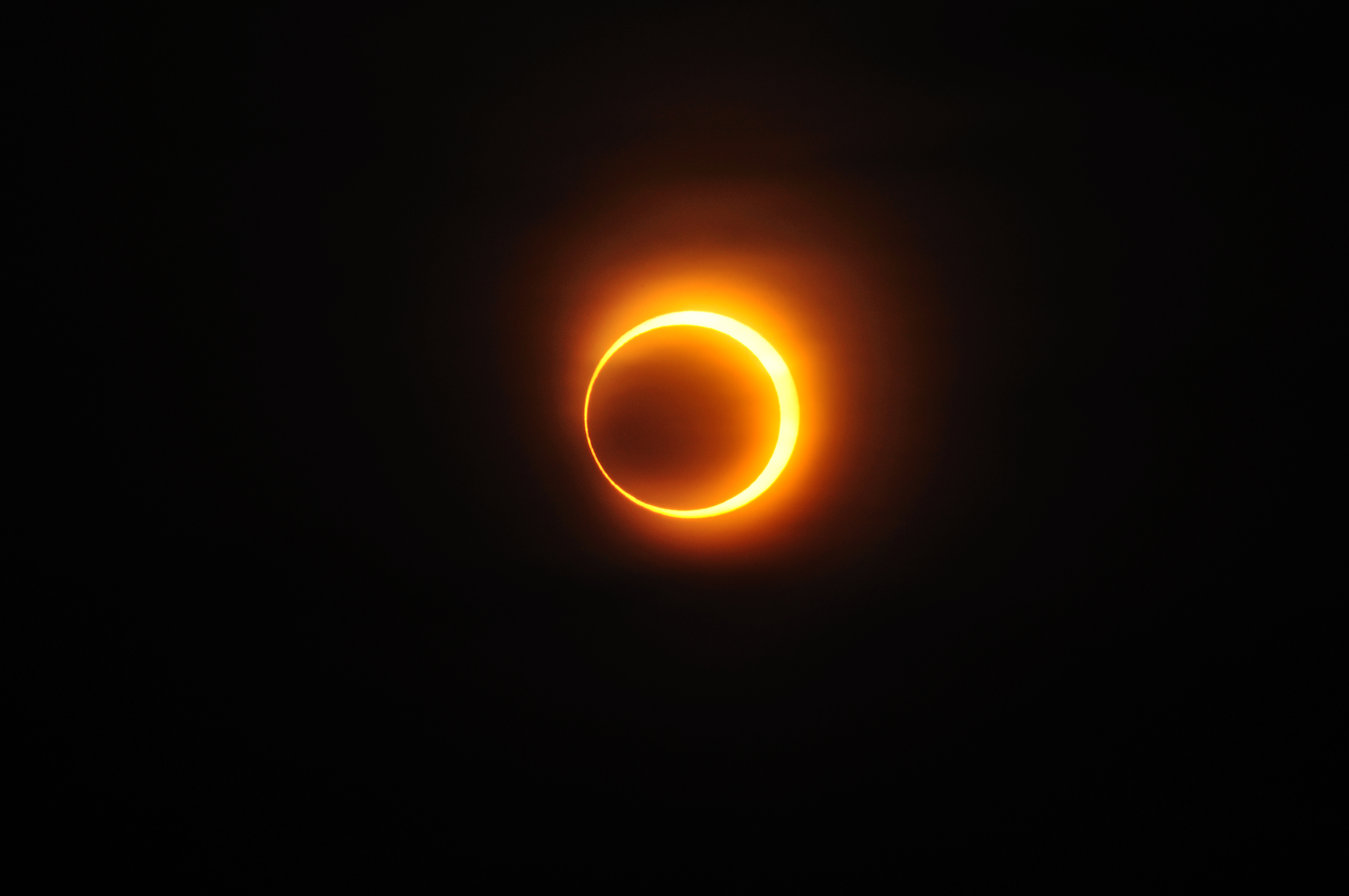
- Annularity from Jinan, China

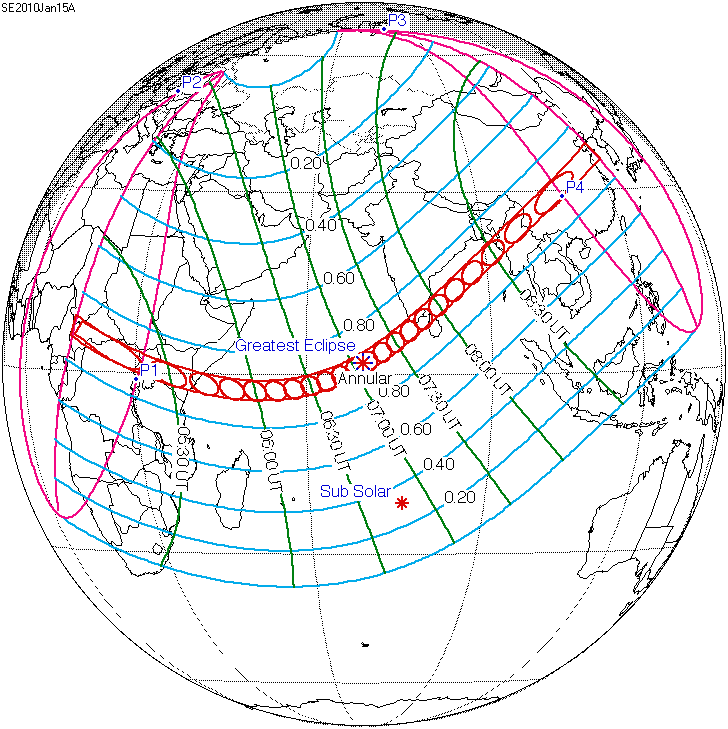
- Map
- Gamma: 0.4002
- Magnitude: 0.919

Maximum eclipse
- Duration: 668 s (11 min 8 s)
- Coordinates: 1.6°N 69.3°E
- Max. width of band: 333 km (207 mi)

Times (UTC)
- (P1) Partial begin: 4:05:28
- (U1) Total begin: 5:13:55
- Greatest eclipse: 7:07:39
- (U4) Total end: 8:59:04
- (P4) Partial end: 10:07:35

References
- Saros: 141 (23 of 70)
- Catalog # (SE5000): 9529

An annular solar eclipse occurred at the Moon's ascending node of orbit on Friday, January 15, 2010, with a magnitude of 0.919. A solar eclipse occurs when the Moon passes between Earth and the Sun, thereby totally or partly obscuring the image of the Sun for a viewer on Earth. An annular solar eclipse occurs when the Moon's apparent diameter is smaller than the Sun's, blocking most of the Sun's light and causing the Sun to look like an annulus (ring). An annular eclipse appears as a partial eclipse over a region of the Earth thousands of kilometres wide. Occurring about 1.75 days before apogee (on January 17, 2010, at 1:40 UTC), the Moon's apparent diameter was smaller.

This was the longest annular solar eclipse of the millennium, and the longest until December 23, 3043, with the length of maximum eclipse of 11 minutes, 7.8 seconds, and the longest duration of 11 minutes, 10.7 seconds. This is about 4 minutes longer than total solar eclipses could ever get. (The solar eclipse of January 4, 1992, was longer, at 11 minutes, 40.9 seconds, occurring in the middle of the Pacific Ocean.)

It was seen as an annular eclipse within a narrow stretch of 300 km (190 mi) width across the Central African Republic, the Democratic Republic of the Congo, Uganda, the Maldives, South Kerala (India), South Tamil Nadu (India), Sri Lanka and parts of Bangladesh, Burma and China. The eclipse was visible as only a partial eclipse in much of Africa, Southeastern Europe, the Middle East and Asia.

== Visibility ==
Animation of path

The eclipse started in the Central African Republic near the border with Chad, traversed DR Congo, Uganda, Kenya, passed through the northern tip of Tanzania, southwestern Somalia and three islands of Seychelles (Bird, Denis and Aride), before it entered the Indian Ocean, where it reached its greatest visibility. It then passed through Maldives. The annular eclipse at Malé, the capital city of the country, started at 12:20:17 and ended at 12:31:02 local time (UTC+5), lasting for 10 minutes and 45 seconds (645 seconds). This was also the longest duration of any eclipse with an international airport in its track.

At approximately 13:20 IST, the annular solar eclipse entered India at Thiruvananthapuram (Trivandrum), the capital of Kerala and exited India at Rameswaram, Tamil Nadu.

The eclipse was viewable for 10 minutes in India. After Rameswaram, it entered Sri Lanka at Delft Island, exited at Jaffna in Sri Lanka, crossed the Bay of Bengal and re-entered India in Mizoram.

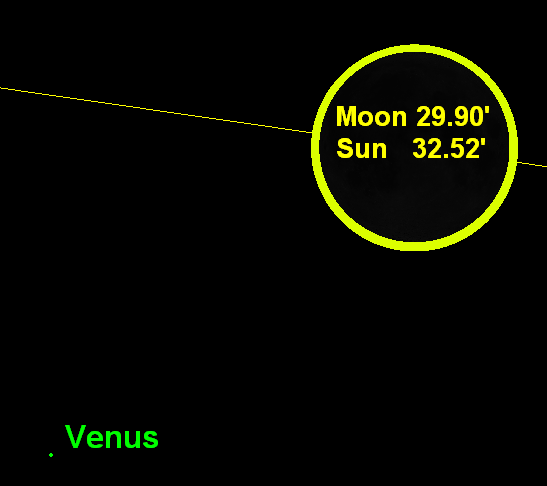
Photographic equipment may allow the planet Venus to be shown about 1.5 degrees west and south of the annular ring of the sun.

Thiruvananthapuram, which was the entry point of the eclipse in India, was equipped with telescopes and announced facilities for the public to view the eclipse. Vikram Sarabhai Space Centre, situated in Trivandrum, analysed the atmospheric-ionospheric parameters during the eclipse. Many scientists camped in the city to witness and study the eclipse.

At Rameswaram, the sunrise was not visible due to thick clouds, but it started getting clear at around 9 am local time and became almost totally clear by the time the eclipse began. The sky had a thin layer of cirrus clouds till 2:30 pm. Among the eclipse-watchers was Sky Watchers' Association of North Bengal (SWAN) from Siliguri at the foothills of West Bengal and Tamil Nadu Astronomical Association.

Dhanushkodi, which falls on the central line of the eclipse, was a good place to view the eclipse. The northernmost limit of shadow in India was Cuddalore, Neyveli, Erode, Kodaikanal, and Madurai. Other prime viewing locations in Tamil Nadu include Thoothukudi and Cape Comorin, 22 km north of the center line. The exact location of the line is between the NH end and the Dhanushkodi ruins. Dhanushkodi is about 2 km east of the central line. The degree difference is about 0.2 between the central line – with Kodandaramar Temple and Dhanushkodi ruins vice versa. Dhanushkodi is about 5 km from the Kodandaramar Temple.

After South Asia, the antumbra passed through the southern tip of Bangladesh, Myanmar and China before leaving the Earth.

== Eclipse timing ==
=== Places experiencing annular eclipse ===
Solar Eclipse of January 15, 2010 (Local Times)
Country or territory	City or place	Start of partial eclipse	Start of annular eclipse	Maximum eclipse	End of annular eclipse	End of partial eclipse	Duration of annularity (min:s)	Duration of eclipse (hr:min)	Maximum coverage
Central African Republic	Bimbo	05:58:41 (sunrise)	06:15:48	06:17:05	06:18:20	07:39:13	2:32	1:41	82.39%
Central African Republic	Bangui	05:58:14 (sunrise)	06:15:12	06:17:10	06:19:07	07:39:30	3:55	1:41	82.39%
Central African Republic	Bozoum	06:09:58 (sunrise)	06:13:55	06:17:25	06:20:56	07:37:55	7:01	1:28	82.27%
Central African Republic	Bambari	05:51:56 (sunrise)	06:15:06	06:18:29	06:21:52	07:43:16	6:46	1:51	82.47%
Central African Republic	Kaga-Bandoro	05:59:50 (sunrise)	06:16:12	06:18:30	06:20:48	07:41:49	4:36	1:42	82.39%
Chad	Moundou	06:14:44 (sunrise)	06:17:36	06:18:39	06:19:16	07:38:50	1:40	1:24	82.23%
Uganda	Entebbe	07:05:42	08:21:21	08:24:47	08:28:12	10:03:42	6:51	2:58	83.11%
Uganda	Kampala	07:05:46	08:21:11	08:25:00	08:28:48	10:04:11	7:37	2:58	83.11%
Uganda	Lira	07:06:23	08:23:54	08:26:06	08:28:15	10:06:10	4:21	3:00	83.10%
Uganda	Mbale	07:06:16	08:23:16	08:27:06	08:30:56	10:08:55	7:40	3:03	83.18%
Kenya	Kisumu	07:06:07	08:23:18	08:27:22	08:31:26	10:09:46	8:08	3:04	83.22%
Kenya	Nakuru	07:06:26	08:24:49	08:29:00	08:33:12	10:13:26	8:23	3:07	83.29%
Kenya	Nairobi	07:06:30	08:26:15	08:29:40	08:33:06	10:14:55	6:51	3:08	83.34%
Kenya	Garissa	07:07:52	08:30:12	08:34:17	08:38:23	10:24:28	8:11	3:17	83.48%
Somalia	Kismayo	07:09:38	08:36:55	08:39:32	08:42:08	10:34:32	5:13	3:25	83.63%
Maldives	Malé	10:15:22	12:20:25	12:25:47	12:31:08	14:23:19	10:43	4:08	84.55%
India	Thiruvananthapuram	11:04:54	13:10:41	13:14:19	13:17:57	15:05:27	7:16	4:01	84.42%
India	Madurai	11:11:43	13:18:24	13:20:02	13:21:41	15:08:58	3:17	3:57	84.36%
Sri Lanka	Jaffna	11:17:42	13:19:35	13:24:40	13:29:43	15:11:20	10:08	3:54	84.33%
India	Mayiladuthurai	11:19:19	13:23:34	13:26:04	13:28:33	15:12:29	4:59	3:53	84.29%
Myanmar	Mandalay	13:25:27	15:04:39	15:08:27	15:12:15	16:34:00	7:36	3:09	83.45%
China	Leshan	15:16:24	16:46:39	16:48:36	16:50:34	18:07:05	3:55	2:51	82.96%
China	Chongqing	15:20:51	16:46:48	16:50:43	16:54:37	18:07:30	7:49	2:47	82.85%
China	Zhengzhou	15:30:43	16:51:31	16:53:48	16:56:05	17:37:07 (sunset)	4:34	2:06	82.48%
China	Jinan	15:33:49	16:53:28	16:54:18	16:55:09	17:19:07 (sunset)	1:41	1:45	82.33%
China	Zibo	15:34:43	16:52:22	16:54:33	16:56:45	17:14:39 (sunset)	4:23	1:40	82.29%
China	Xinyang	15:31:20	16:52:03	16:54:39	16:57:15	17:41:19 (sunset)	5:12	2:10	82.52%
China	Huaibei	15:34:06	16:51:52	16:55:13	16:58:34	17:26:21 (sunset)	6:42	1:52	82.39%
China	Xuzhou	15:34:26	16:51:49	16:55:15	16:58:42	17:24:05 (sunset)	6:53	1:50	82.37%
China	Qingdao	15:36:52	16:51:50	16:55:26	16:59:02	17:07:09 (sunset)	7:12	1:30	82.22%

=== Places experiencing partial eclipse ===
Solar Eclipse of January 15, 2010 (Local Times)
Country or territory	City or place	Start of partial eclipse	Maximum eclipse	End of partial eclipse	Duration of eclipse (hr:min)	Maximum coverage
Republic of the Congo	Impfondo	05:55:57 (sunrise)	06:16:09	07:37:03	1:41	75.91%
Central African Republic	Berbérati	06:09:08 (sunrise)	06:16:29	07:35:58	1:27	80.70%
Democratic Republic of the Congo	Kisangani	06:25:42 (sunrise)	07:18:53	08:47:49	2:22	80.43%
Central African Republic	Bria	05:47:52 (sunrise)	06:19:27	07:45:41	1:58	82.29%
Burundi	Gitega	06:05:41	07:21:31	08:54:57	2:49	73.74%
Rwanda	Kigali	06:05:29	07:21:54	08:56:24	2:54	78.33%
Uganda	Gulu	07:06:29	08:25:39	10:04:54	2:58	82.99%
South Sudan	Juba	07:07:24	08:25:54	10:04:09	2:57	78.62%
Chad	N'Djamena	06:24:26 (sunrise)	06:27:53	07:39:35	1:15	70.99%
Cameroon	Yaoundé	06:25:36 (sunrise)	06:27:58	07:31:16	1:06	65.89%
Tanzania	Dar es Salaam	07:07:54	08:31:52	10:17:13	3:09	71.68%
Kenya	Mombasa	07:07:27	08:33:04	10:21:24	3:14	80.44%
Ethiopia	Addis Ababa	07:14:32	08:38:54	10:26:13	3:12	60.55%
Somalia	Mogadishu	07:13:14	08:46:57	10:46:52	3:34	77.26%
Seychelles	Victoria	08:22:14	10:09:08	12:17:21	3:55	83.79%
Maldives	Addu City	10:07:20	12:15:12	14:13:42	4:06	78.02%
Maldives	Kulhudhuffushi	10:18:18	12:28:57	14:26:05	4:08	83.61%
Sri Lanka	Sri Jayawardenepura Kotte	11:12:13	13:19:41	15:07:28	3:55	83.19%
India	New Delhi	11:53:06	13:39:08	15:11:04	3:18	41.49%
India	Kolkata	12:07:17	13:57:36	15:29:08	3:22	75.99%
Bangladesh	Dhaka	12:44:05	14:31:36	16:01:00	3:17	77.09%
Bhutan	Thimphu	12:47:52	14:32:13	15:59:55	3:12	66.39%
South Korea	Seoul	16:41:02	17:33:58	17:37:01 (sunset)	0:56	55.79%
Myanmar	Yangon	13:20:28	15:04:45	16:30:49	3:10	74.11%
Thailand	Bangkok	14:00:25	15:37:26	16:58:08	2:58	57.28%
Laos	Vientiane	14:08:17	15:43:18	17:02:46	2:54	64.73%
Vietnam	Hanoi	14:16:53	15:48:06	17:05:05	2:48	67.35%
China	Beijing	15:32:46	16:52:28	17:13:19 (sunset)	1:41	74.34%
Hong Kong	Hong Kong	15:32:46	16:54:12	18:00:06 (sunset)	2:27	57.32%
Taiwan	Taipei	15:42:29	16:57:28	17:25:41 (sunset)	1:43	54.91%

== Gallery ==
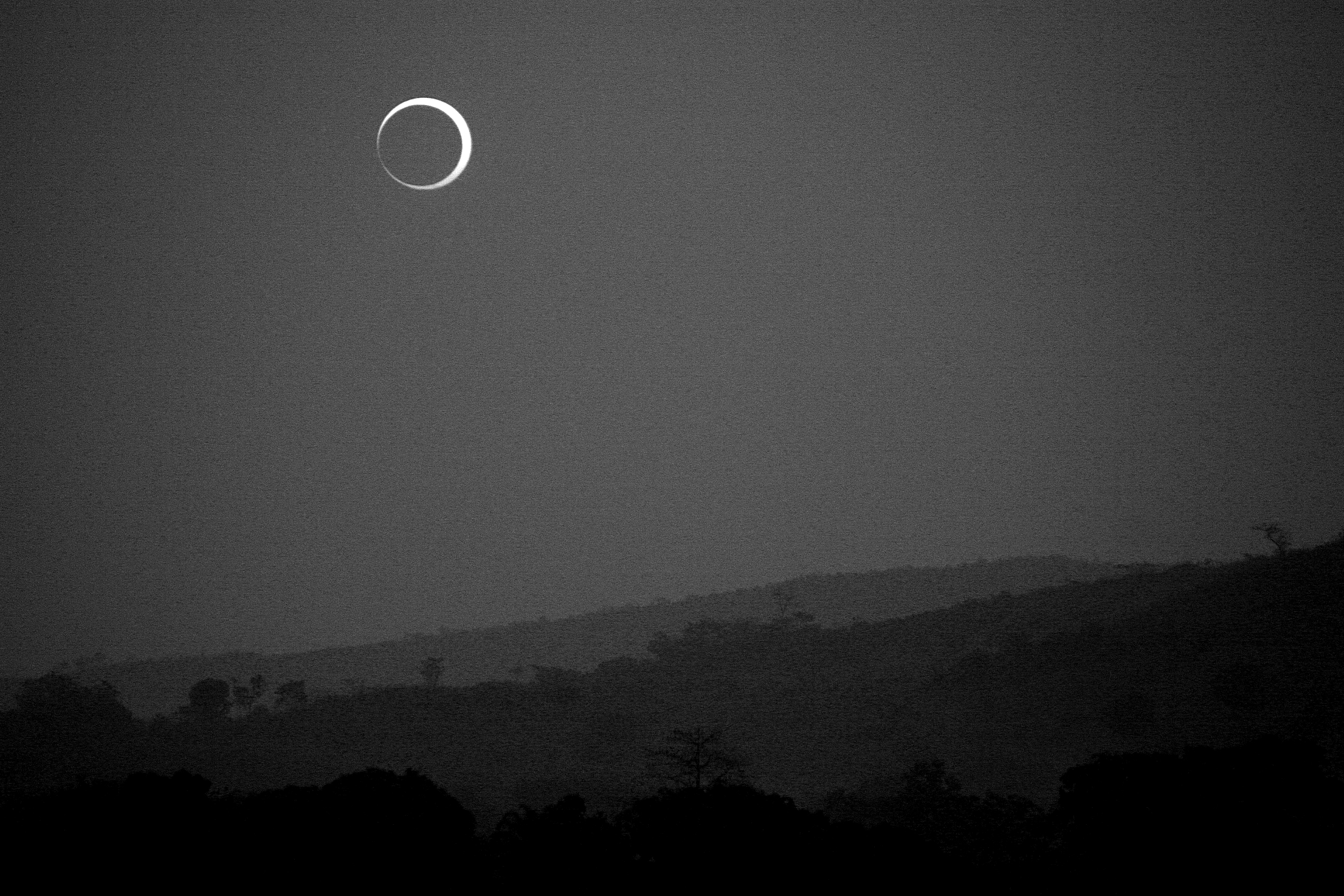
The eclipse in Bangui, Central African Republic at sunrise

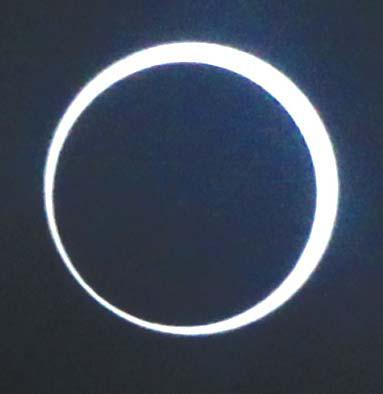
The eclipse from Thiruvananthapuram, India where the eclipse was 92%

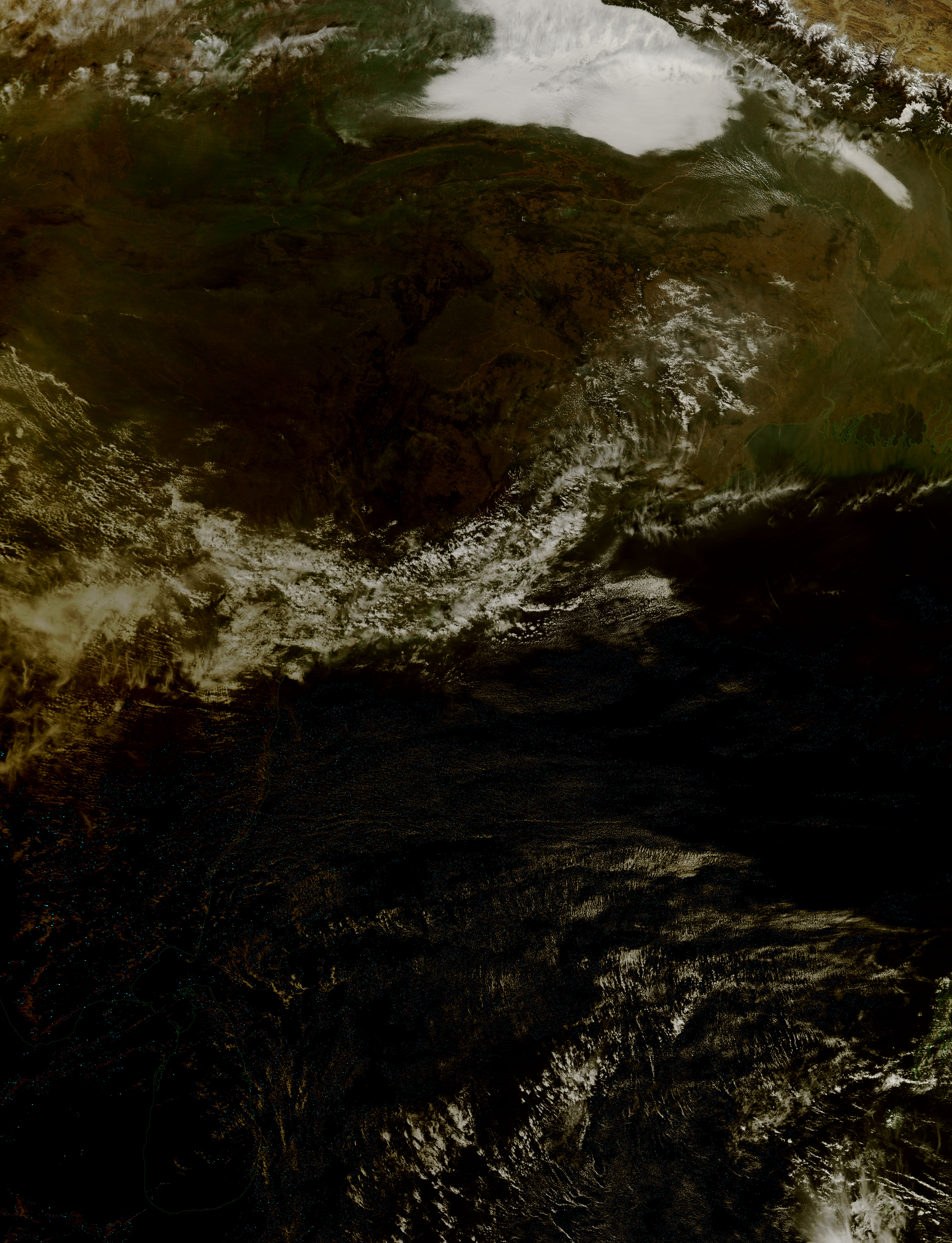
Satellite image showing the moon's antumbra falling over India and the Bay of Bengal

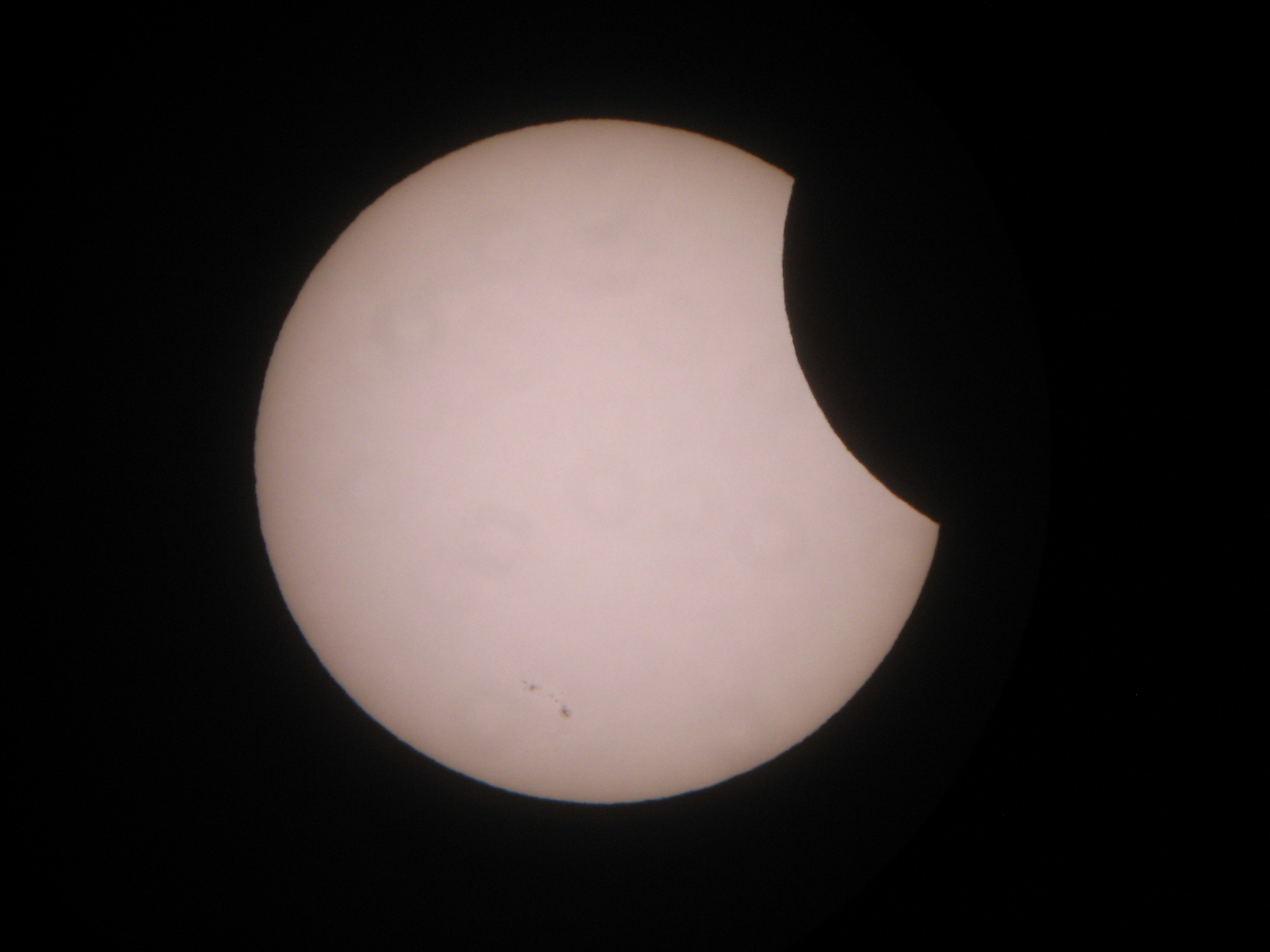
Degania A, Israel, 5:41 UTC

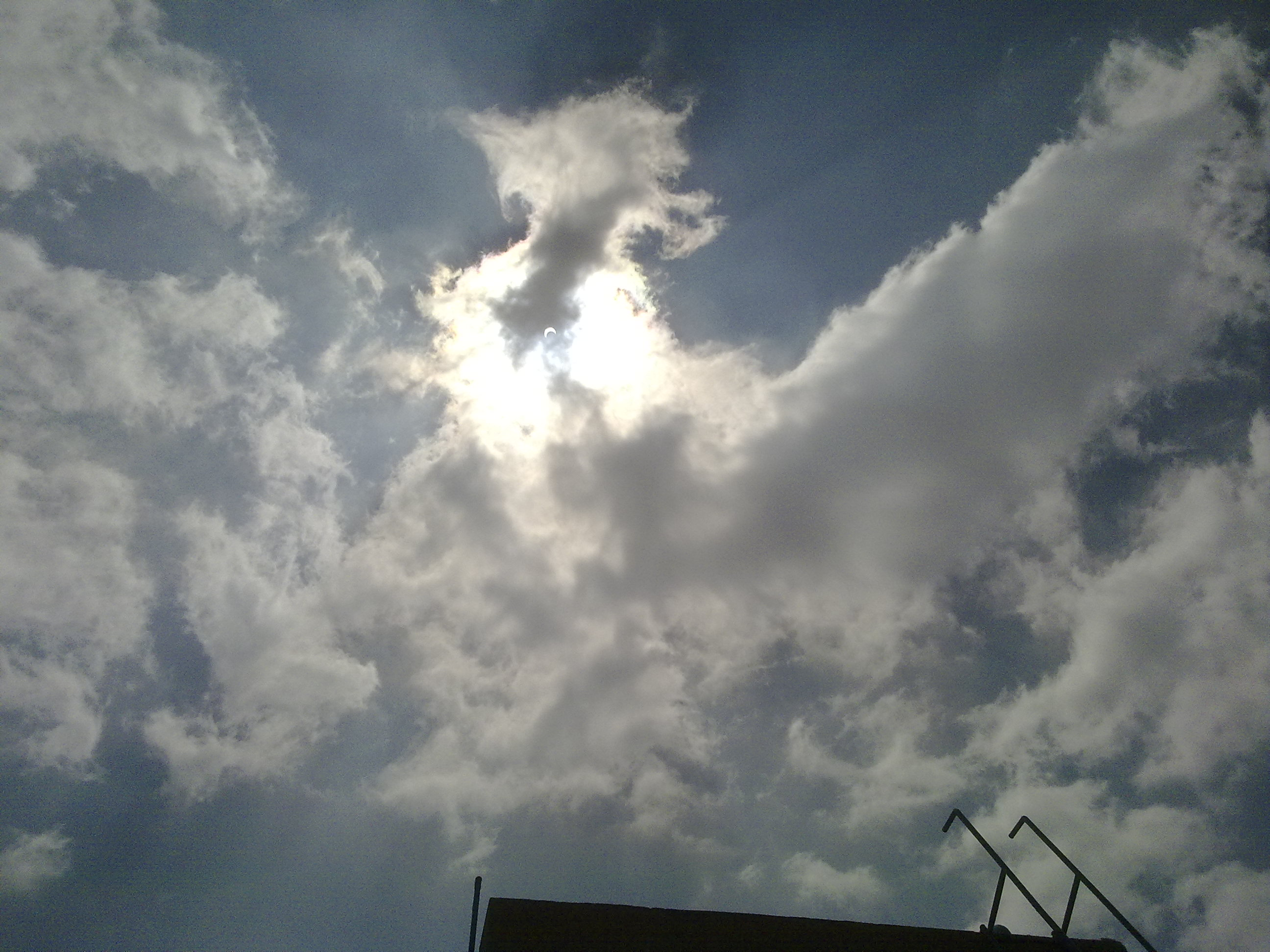
Bangalore, India, 7:20 UTC

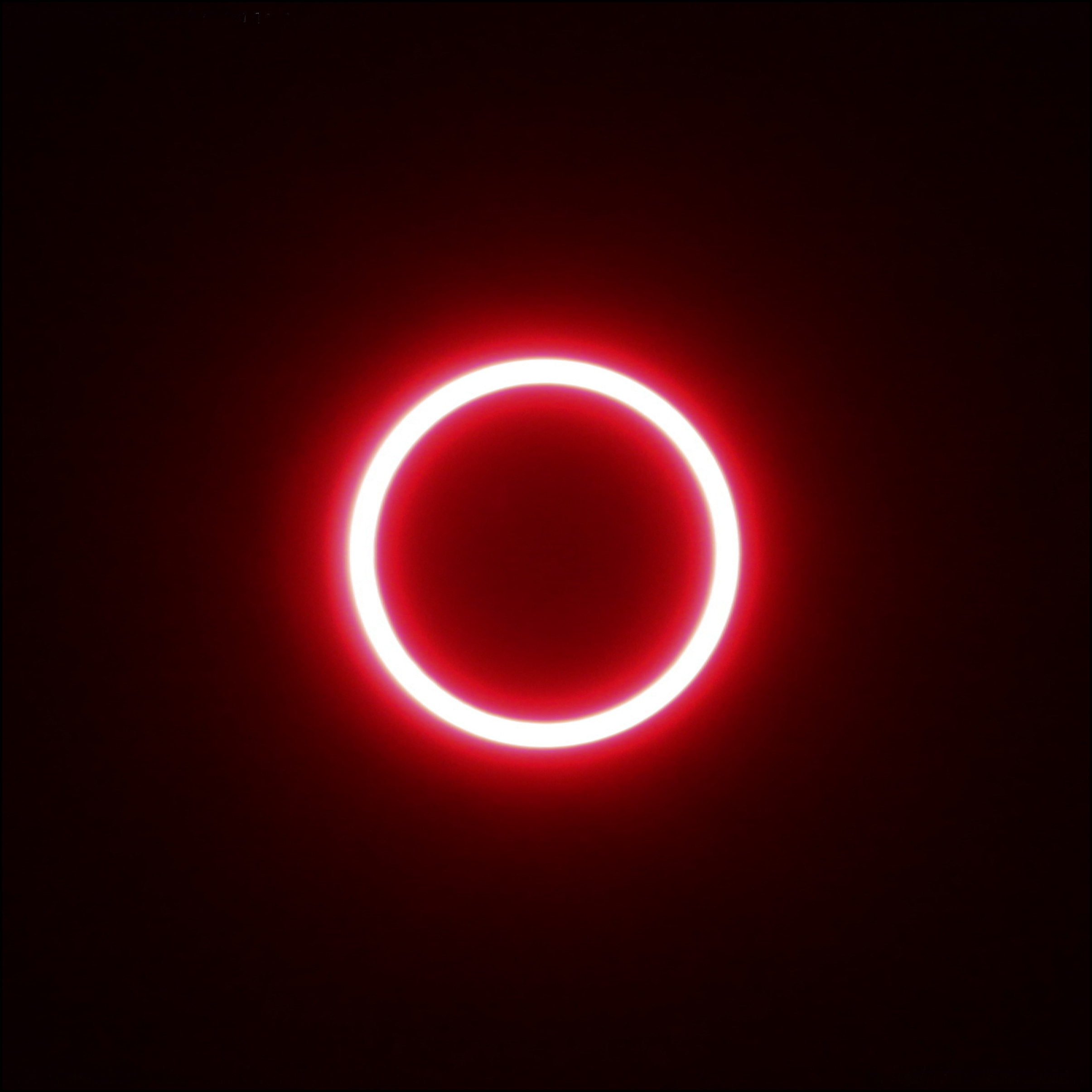
Jaffna, Sri Lanka, 7:56 UTC

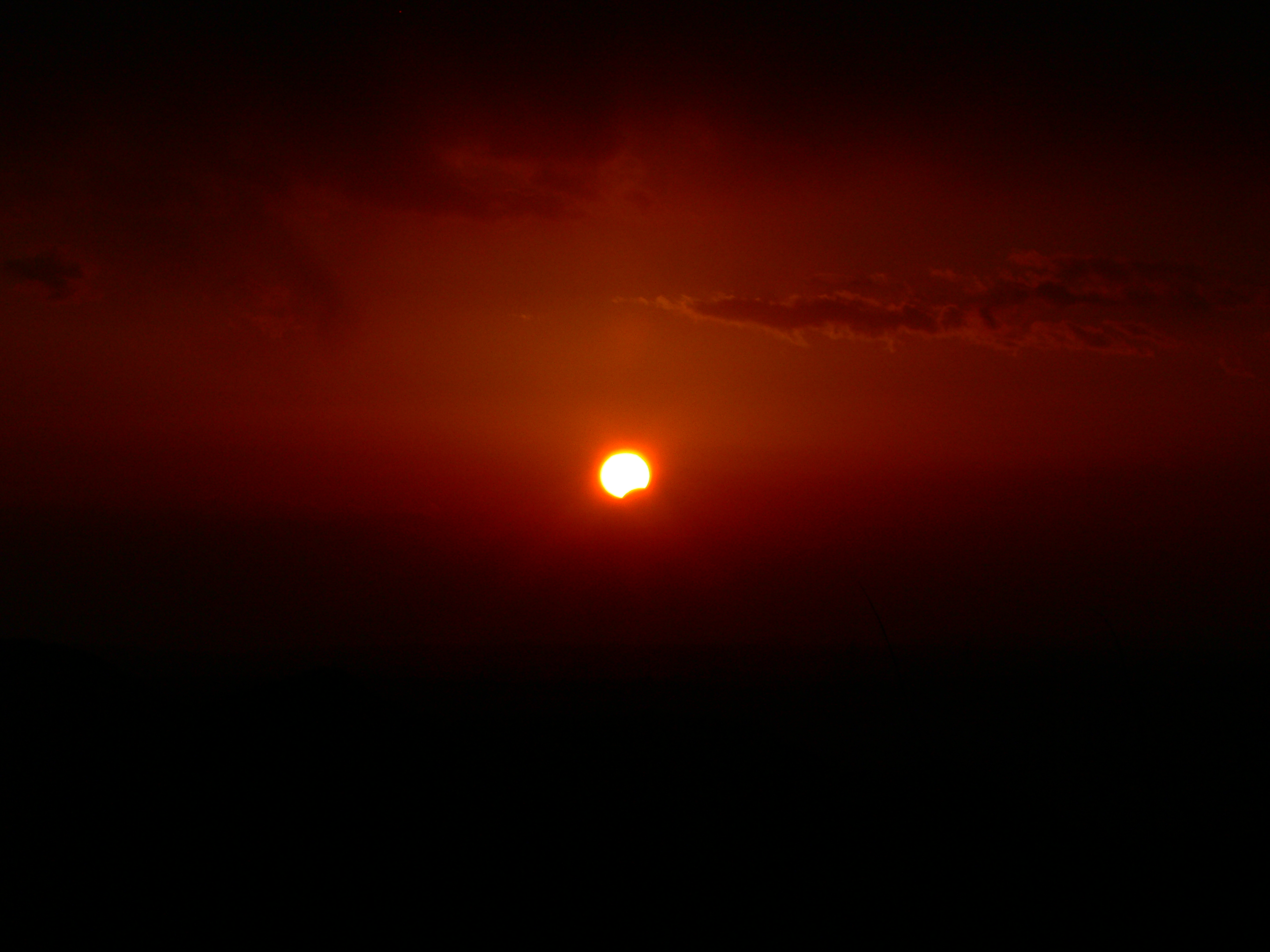
Sanda, Hyogo, 7:59 UTC

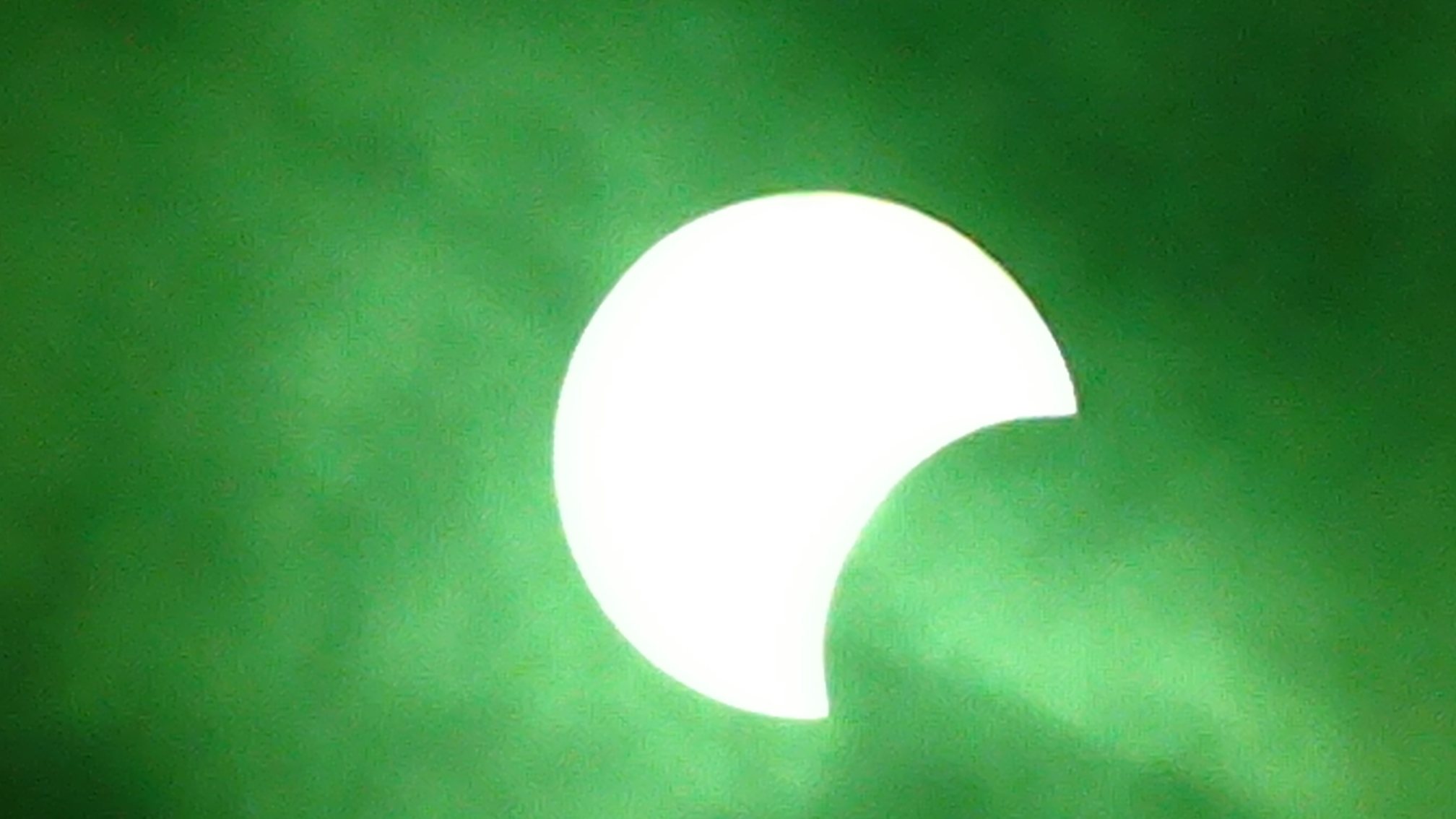
Bandar Pusat Jengka, Malaysia, 8:05 UTC

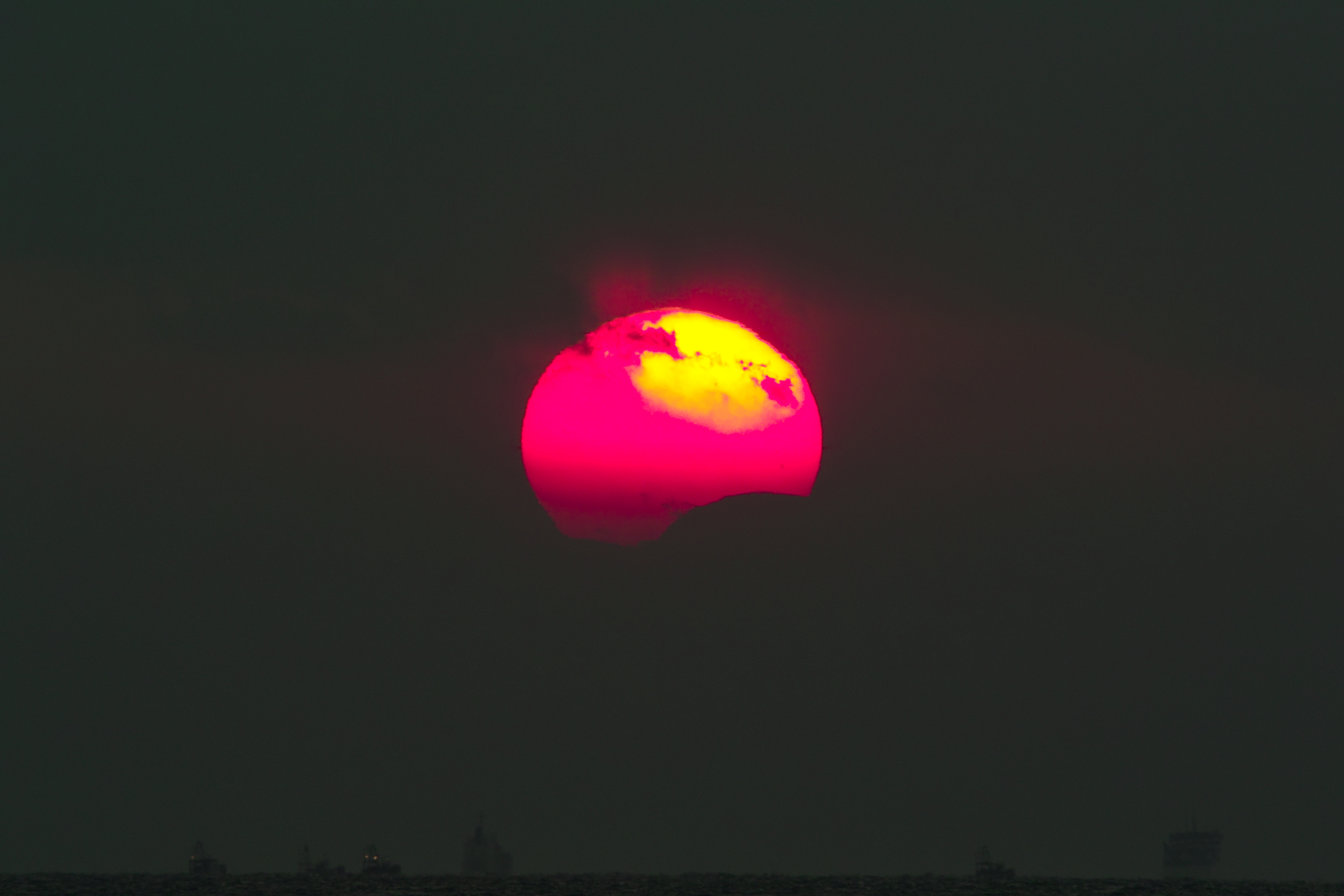
Akashi, Hyogo, 8:05 UTC

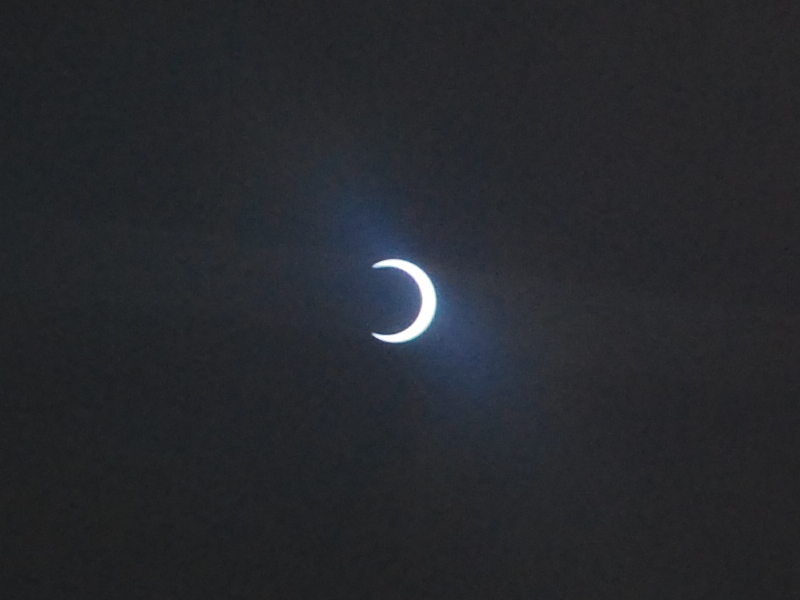
Chennai, India, 8:10 UTC

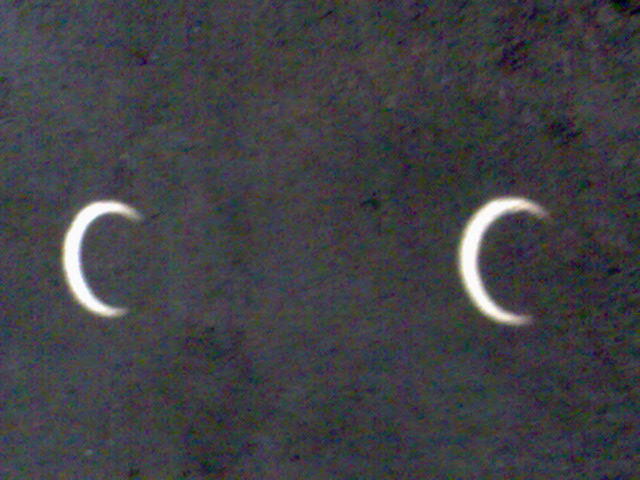
Reflection of the eclipse from Pallipalayam, India

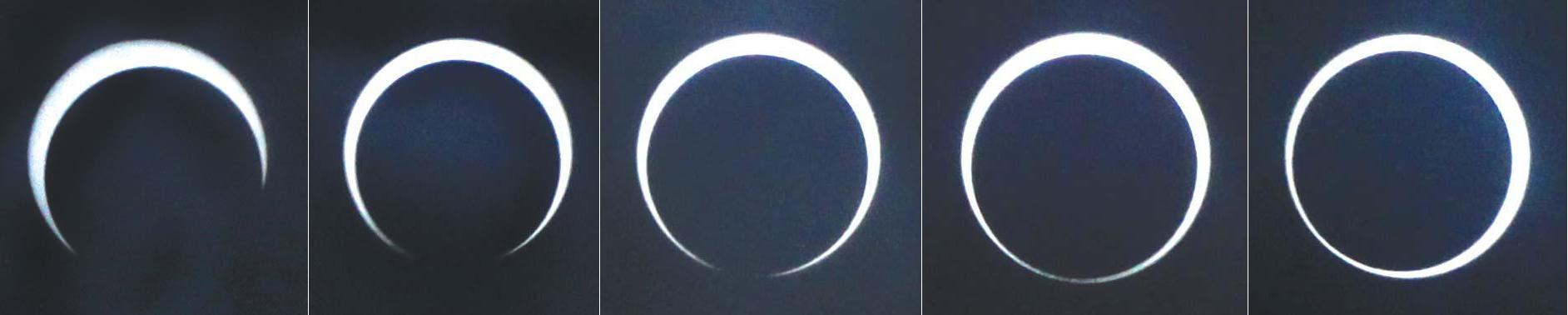
Stages of annular eclipse from Thiruvananthapuram, India

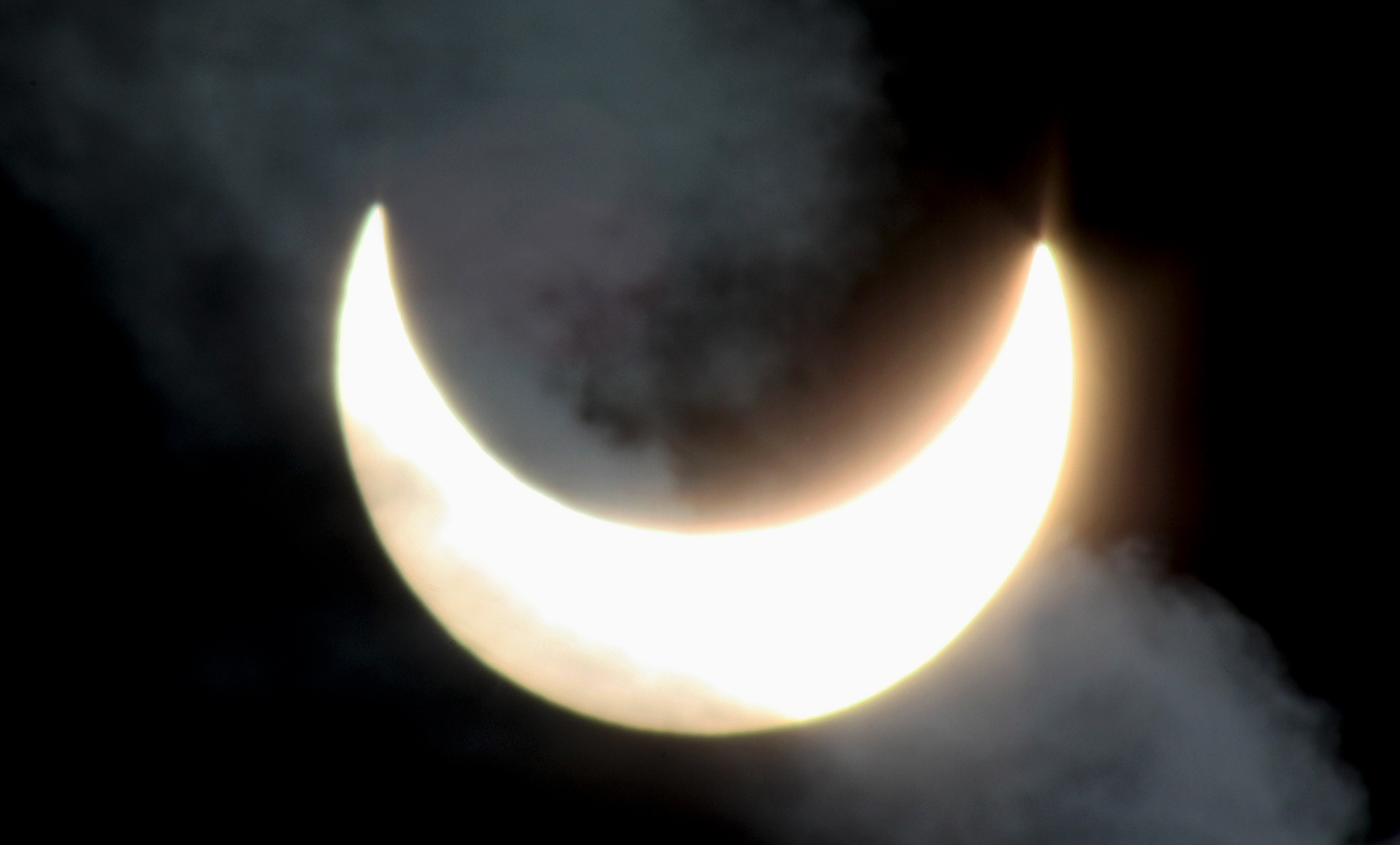
Batticaloa, Sri Lanka, 8:28 UTC

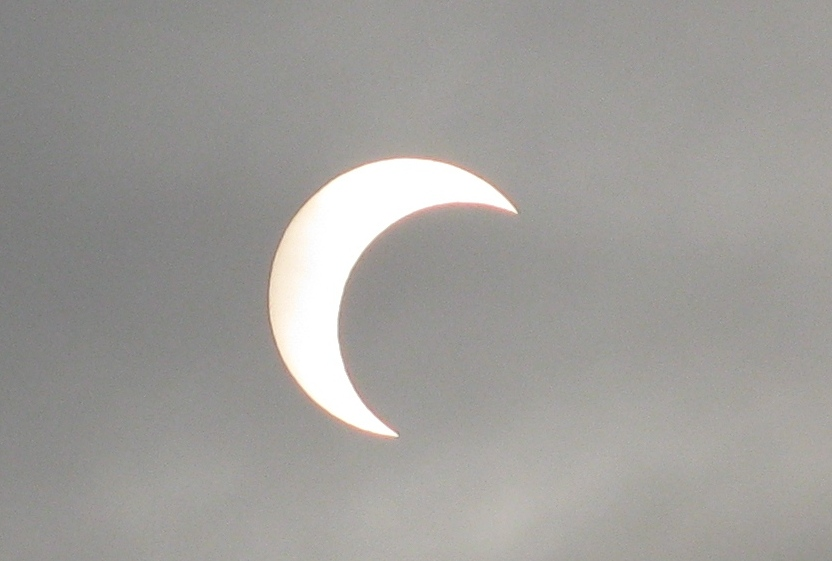
Hanoi, Vietnam, 8:39 UTC

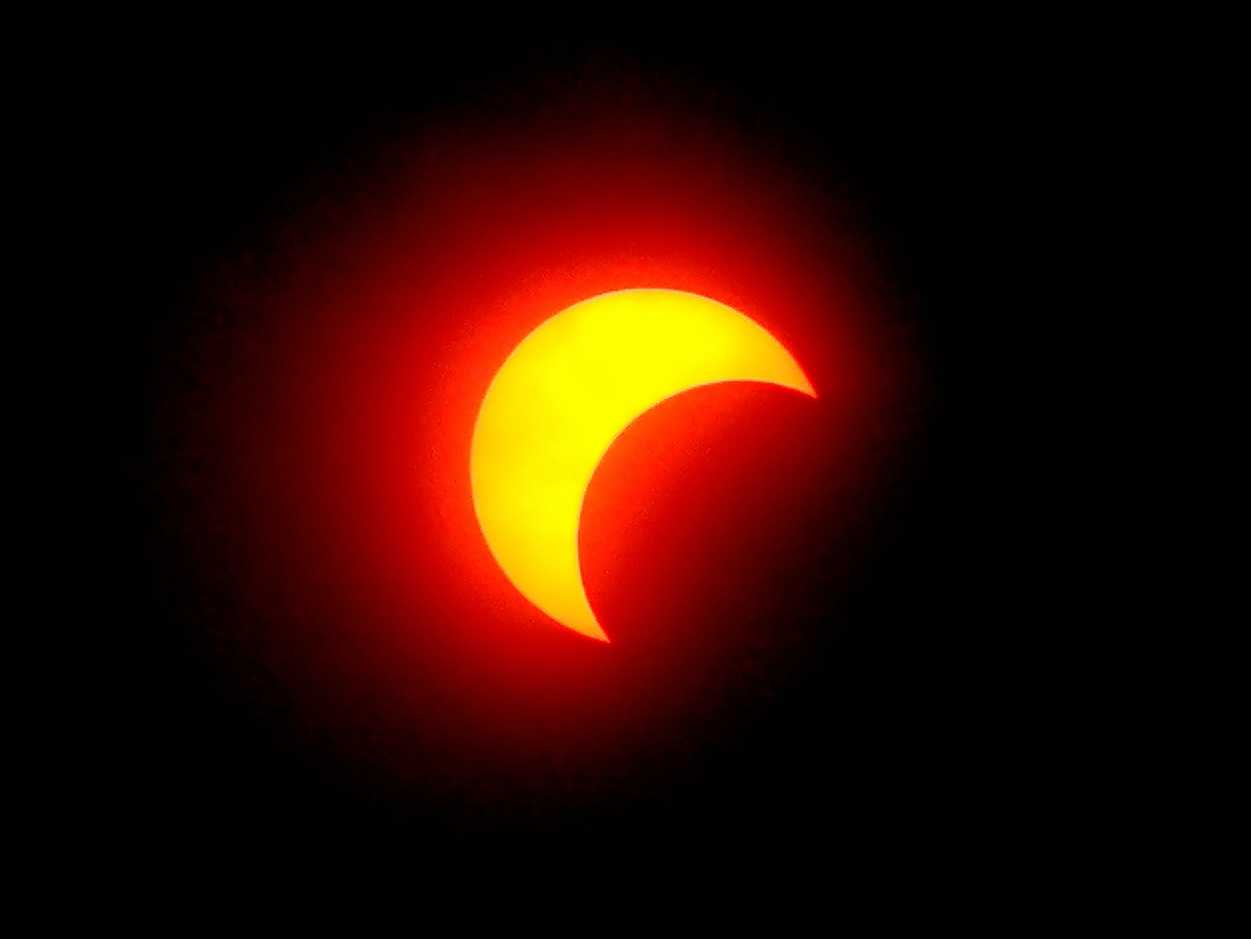
Central, Hong Kong, 8:40 UTC

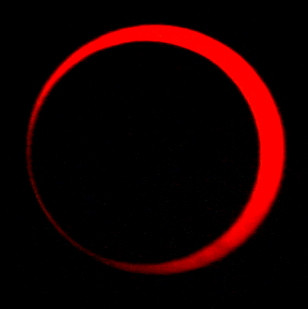
Bangui, Central African Republic

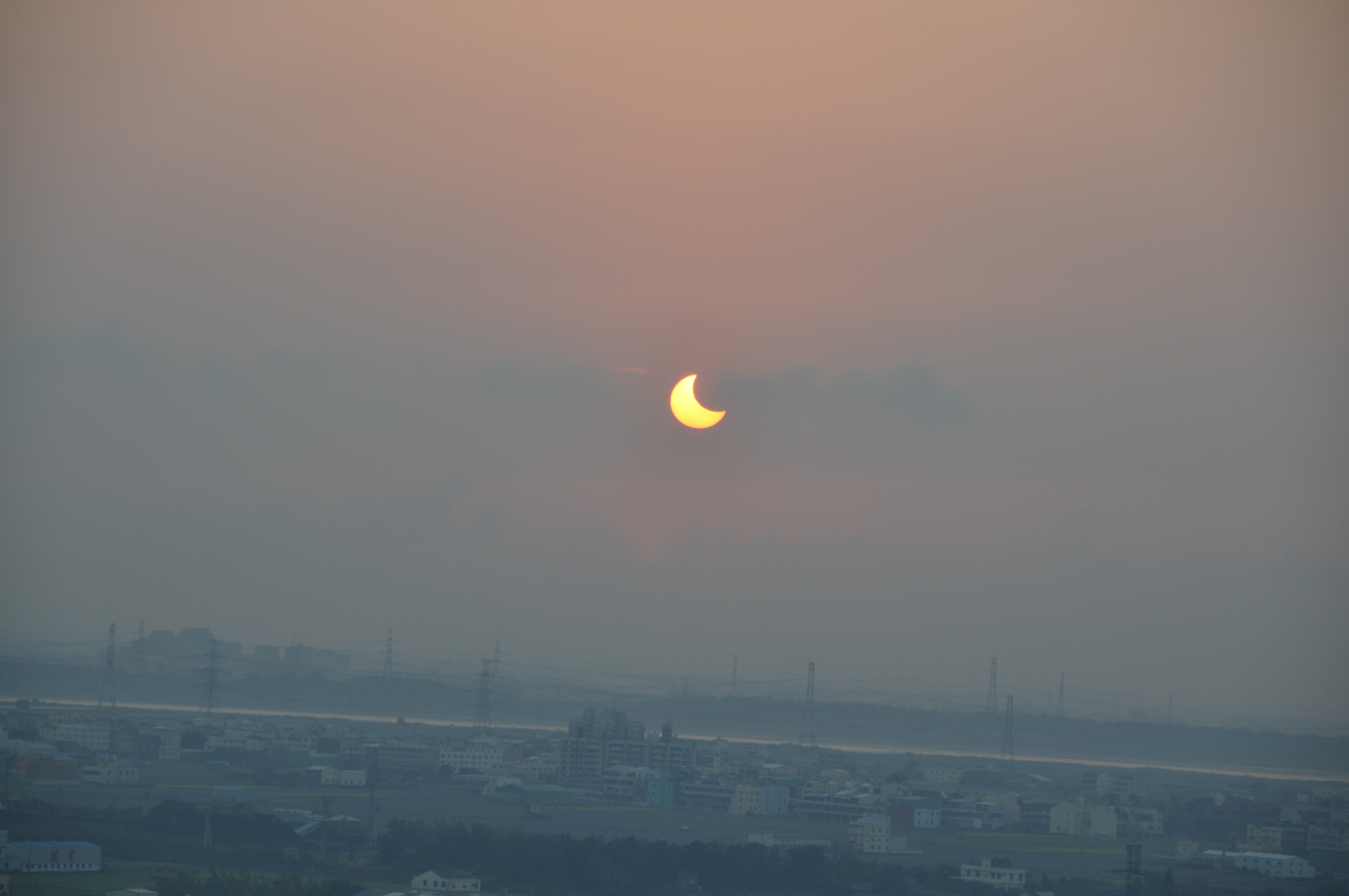
Taichung, Taiwan, 9:19 UTC

== Eclipse details ==
Shown below are two tables displaying details about this particular solar eclipse. The first table outlines times at which the Moon's penumbra or umbra attains the specific parameter, and the second table describes various other parameters pertaining to this eclipse.

January 15, 2010 Solar Eclipse Times
Event	Time (UTC)
First Penumbral External Contact	2010 January 15 at 04:06:33.7 UTC
First Umbral External Contact	2010 January 15 at 05:15:01.1 UTC
First Central Line	2010 January 15 at 05:18:40.9 UTC
First Umbral Internal Contact	2010 January 15 at 05:22:22.0 UTC
First Penumbral Internal Contact	2010 January 15 at 06:51:13.0 UTC
Greatest Duration	2010 January 15 at 06:55:35.8 UTC
Greatest Eclipse	2010 January 15 at 07:07:39.2 UTC
Ecliptic Conjunction	2010 January 15 at 07:12:28.5 UTC
Equatorial Conjunction	2010 January 15 at 07:21:27.5 UTC
Last Penumbral Internal Contact	2010 January 15 at 07:23:43.9 UTC
Last Umbral Internal Contact	2010 January 15 at 08:52:46.6 UTC
Last Central Line	2010 January 15 at 08:56:28.9 UTC
Last Umbral External Contact	2010 January 15 at 09:00:10.0 UTC
Last Penumbral External Contact	2010 January 15 at 10:08:41.4 UTC

January 15, 2010 Solar Eclipse Parameters
Parameter	Value
Eclipse Magnitude	0.91903
Eclipse Obscuration	0.84462
Gamma	0.40016
Sun Right Ascension	19h47m51.0s
Sun Declination	-21°07'38.7"
Sun Semi-Diameter	16'15.5"
Sun Equatorial Horizontal Parallax	08.9"
Moon Right Ascension	19h47m25.3s
Moon Declination	-20°46'54.8"
Moon Semi-Diameter	14'44.3"
Moon Equatorial Horizontal Parallax	0°54'05.4"
ΔT	66.0 s

== Eclipse season ==
This eclipse is part of an eclipse season, a period, roughly every six months, when eclipses occur. Only two (or occasionally three) eclipse seasons occur each year, and each season lasts about 35 days and repeats just short of six months (173 days) later; thus two full eclipse seasons always occur each year. Either two or three eclipses happen each eclipse season. In the sequence below, each eclipse is separated by a fortnight.

Eclipse season of December 2009–January 2010
December 31 Descending node (full moon)	January 15 Ascending node (new moon)
Partial lunar eclipse Lunar Saros 115	Annular solar eclipse Solar Saros 141

== Related eclipses ==
=== Eclipses in 2010 ===
- An annular solar eclipse on January 15.
- A partial lunar eclipse on June 26.
- A total solar eclipse on July 11.
- A total lunar eclipse on December 21.

=== Metonic ===
- Preceded by: Solar eclipse of March 29, 2006
- Followed by: Solar eclipse of November 3, 2013

=== Tzolkinex ===
- Preceded by: Solar eclipse of December 4, 2002
- Followed by: Solar eclipse of February 26, 2017

=== Half-Saros ===
- Preceded by: Lunar eclipse of January 9, 2001
- Followed by: Lunar eclipse of January 21, 2019

=== Tritos ===
- Preceded by: Solar eclipse of February 16, 1999
- Followed by: Solar eclipse of December 14, 2020

=== Solar Saros 141 ===
- Preceded by: Solar eclipse of January 4, 1992
- Followed by: Solar eclipse of January 26, 2028

=== Inex ===
- Preceded by: Solar eclipse of February 4, 1981
- Followed by: Solar eclipse of December 26, 2038

=== Triad ===
- Preceded by: Solar eclipse of March 17, 1923
- Followed by: Solar eclipse of November 15, 2096

=== Solar eclipses of 2008–2011 ===
This eclipse is a member of a semester series. An eclipse in a semester series of solar eclipses repeats approximately every 177 days and 4 hours (a semester) at alternating nodes of the Moon's orbit.

The partial solar eclipses on June 1, 2011 and November 25, 2011 occur in the next lunar year eclipse set.

Solar eclipse series sets from 2008 to 2011
Ascending node			Descending node		
Saros	Map	Gamma	Saros	Map	Gamma
121 Partial in Christchurch, New Zealand	February 7, 2008 Annular	−0.95701	126 Totality in Kumul, Xinjiang, China	August 1, 2008 Total	0.83070
131 Annularity in Palangka Raya, Indonesia	January 26, 2009 Annular	−0.28197	136 Totality in Kurigram District, Bangladesh	July 22, 2009 Total	0.06977
141 Annularity in Jinan, Shandong, China	January 15, 2010 Annular	0.40016	146 Totality in Hao, French Polynesia	July 11, 2010 Total	−0.67877
151 Partial in Poland	January 4, 2011 Partial	1.06265	156	July 1, 2011 Partial	−1.49171

=== Saros 141 ===
This eclipse is a part of Saros series 141, repeating every 18 years, 11 days, and containing 70 events. The series started with a partial solar eclipse on May 19, 1613. It contains annular eclipses from August 4, 1739 through October 14, 2640. There are no hybrid or total eclipses in this set. The series ends at member 70 as a partial eclipse on June 13, 2857. Its eclipses are tabulated in three columns; every third eclipse in the same column is one exeligmos apart, so they all cast shadows over approximately the same parts of the Earth.

The longest duration of annularity was produced by member 20 at 12 minutes, 9 seconds on December 14, 1955. All eclipses in this series occur at the Moon’s ascending node of orbit.

Series members 12–33 occur between 1801 and 2200:
12	13	14
September 17, 1811	September 28, 1829	October 9, 1847
15	16	17
October 19, 1865	October 30, 1883	November 11, 1901
18	19	20
November 22, 1919	December 2, 1937	December 14, 1955
21	22	23
December 24, 1973	January 4, 1992	January 15, 2010
24	25	26
January 26, 2028	February 5, 2046	February 17, 2064
27	28	29
February 27, 2082	March 10, 2100	March 22, 2118
30	31	32
April 1, 2136	April 12, 2154	April 23, 2172
33
May 4, 2190

=== Metonic series ===
The metonic series repeats eclipses every 19 years (6939.69 days), lasting about 5 cycles. Eclipses occur in nearly the same calendar date. In addition, the octon subseries repeats 1/5 of that or every 3.8 years (1387.94 days). All eclipses in this table occur at the Moon's ascending node.

20 eclipse events between June 10, 1964 and August 21, 2036
June 10–11	March 28–29	January 14–16	November 3	August 21–22
117	119	121	123	125
June 10, 1964	March 28, 1968	January 16, 1972	November 3, 1975	August 22, 1979
127	129	131	133	135
June 11, 1983	March 29, 1987	January 15, 1991	November 3, 1994	August 22, 1998
137	139	141	143	145
June 10, 2002	March 29, 2006	January 15, 2010	November 3, 2013	August 21, 2017
147	149	151	153	155
June 10, 2021	March 29, 2025	January 14, 2029	November 3, 2032	August 21, 2036

=== Tritos series ===
This eclipse is a part of a tritos cycle, repeating at alternating nodes every 135 synodic months (≈ 3986.63 days, or 11 years minus 1 month). Their appearance and longitude are irregular due to a lack of synchronization with the anomalistic month (period of perigee), but groupings of 3 tritos cycles (≈ 33 years minus 3 months) come close (≈ 434.044 anomalistic months), so eclipses are similar in these groupings.

Series members between 1801 and 2200
August 28, 1802 (Saros 122)	July 27, 1813 (Saros 123)	June 26, 1824 (Saros 124)	May 27, 1835 (Saros 125)	April 25, 1846 (Saros 126)
March 25, 1857 (Saros 127)	February 23, 1868 (Saros 128)	January 22, 1879 (Saros 129)	December 22, 1889 (Saros 130)	November 22, 1900 (Saros 131)
October 22, 1911 (Saros 132)	September 21, 1922 (Saros 133)	August 21, 1933 (Saros 134)	July 20, 1944 (Saros 135)	June 20, 1955 (Saros 136)
May 20, 1966 (Saros 137)	April 18, 1977 (Saros 138)	March 18, 1988 (Saros 139)	February 16, 1999 (Saros 140)	January 15, 2010 (Saros 141)
December 14, 2020 (Saros 142)	November 14, 2031 (Saros 143)	October 14, 2042 (Saros 144)	September 12, 2053 (Saros 145)	August 12, 2064 (Saros 146)
July 13, 2075 (Saros 147)	June 11, 2086 (Saros 148)	May 11, 2097 (Saros 149)	April 11, 2108 (Saros 150)	March 11, 2119 (Saros 151)
February 8, 2130 (Saros 152)	January 8, 2141 (Saros 153)	December 8, 2151 (Saros 154)	November 7, 2162 (Saros 155)	October 7, 2173 (Saros 156)
September 4, 2184 (Saros 157)	August 5, 2195 (Saros 158)			

=== Inex series ===
This eclipse is a part of the long period inex cycle, repeating at alternating nodes, every 358 synodic months (≈ 10,571.95 days, or 29 years minus 20 days). Their appearance and longitude are irregular due to a lack of synchronization with the anomalistic month (period of perigee). However, groupings of 3 inex cycles (≈ 87 years minus 2 months) comes close (≈ 1,151.02 anomalistic months), so eclipses are similar in these groupings.

Series members between 1801 and 2200
June 6, 1807 (Saros 134)	May 15, 1836 (Saros 135)	April 25, 1865 (Saros 136)
April 6, 1894 (Saros 137)	March 17, 1923 (Saros 138)	February 25, 1952 (Saros 139)
February 4, 1981 (Saros 140)	January 15, 2010 (Saros 141)	December 26, 2038 (Saros 142)
December 6, 2067 (Saros 143)	November 15, 2096 (Saros 144)	October 26, 2125 (Saros 145)
October 7, 2154 (Saros 146)	September 16, 2183 (Saros 147)	
