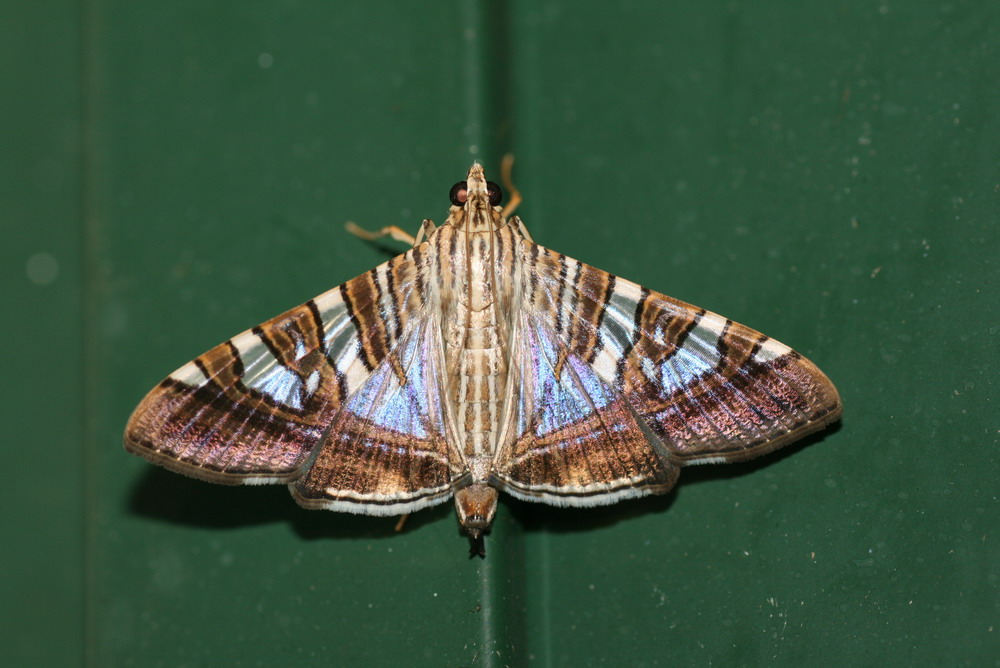

Scientific classification
- Domain: Eukaryota
- Kingdom: Animalia
- Phylum: Arthropoda
- Class: Insecta
- Order: Lepidoptera
- Family: Crambidae
- Genus: Glyphodes
- Species: G. stolalis

Binomial name
- Glyphodes stolalis Guenée, 1854

Synonyms
- Glyphodes substolalis Snellen, 1899

= Glyphodes stolalis =

Species of moth

Glyphodes stolalis is a moth in the family Crambidae. It was described by Achille Guenée in 1854. It is found in Cameroon, the Comoros, the Democratic Republic of the Congo (Equateur, Orientale, North Kivu), Kenya, Réunion, Madagascar, the Seychelles (Félicité, Denis, Silhouette, Round, Sainte-Marie, Mahé, Long), South Africa (KwaZulu-Natal), the Gambia, Uganda, Zimbabwe, China, India, Indonesia (Sulawesi), Sri Lanka, Japan, Taiwan, Thailand and Australia (Western Australia, Queensland).
