= Mozambique (disambiguation) =

Mozambique (formerly often spelled in English as in Portuguese, Moçambique) most commonly refers to the country in southeastern Africa. The term may also refer to:

== Places ==
- the Island of Mozambique on the Nacala Coast, northern Mozambique, or the historic town of Moçambique thereon
- Mozambique, Seychelles, an island in Poivre Atoll, Seychelles
- the former province of Moçambique in Portuguese East Africa (now Nampula Province in Mozambique)
- the Mozambique Channel separating the country of Mozambique from Madagascar

== Art, entertainment, and media ==
- Mozambique (film), a 1964 film
- Mozambique (music), a vigorous style of Cuban music and dance
- "Mozambique" (song), a song by Bob Dylan on his album Desire
- "Mozambique", a song by Traffic from the album Far from Home

== Other uses ==
- Mozambique drill, a technique used in pistol shooting
