= Étoile Cay =

Uninhabited circular coral cay in Seychelles

Nickname: Lampériaire Cay
- Location within Seychelles

Geography
- Location: Indian Ocean
- Coordinates: 05°53′S 53°19′E
- Archipelago: Seychelles
- Adjacent to: Indian Ocean
- Total islands: 1
- Major islands: Étoile Cay
- Area: 0.05 km^{2} (0.019 sq mi)
- Length: 0.4 km (0.25 mi)
- Width: 0.14 km (0.087 mi)
- Coastline: 1 km (0.6 mi)
- Highest elevation: 4.6 m (15.1 ft)

Administration
- Seychelles
- Group: Outer Islands
- Sub-Group: Amirante Islands
- Districts: Outer Islands District

Demographics
- Population: 0 (2014)
- Pop. density: 0/km^{2} (0/sq mi)
- Ethnic groups: Creole, French, East Africans, Indians.

Additional information
- Time zone: SCT (UTC+4)
- ISO code: SC-26
- Official website: www.seychelles.travel/en/discover/the-islands/outer-islands

Étoile Cay is an uninhabited circular coral cay in Seychelles, lying in the Amirantes group of the Outer Islands of Seychelles, with a distance of 302 km south of Victoria, Seychelles.

== History ==
Étoile Cay was named after a ship used in Bougainville's famous voyage round the world, from 1766 to 1769. It was explored and named by the Chevalier du Roslan in 1771.

== Geography ==
Étoile Cay lies 29 km northeast of Boudeuse Cay, and 32 km Southwest of Poivre Atoll. It lies on a coral reef about 1.6 km in diameter. The cay is treeless. The only vegetation is grass and low shrubs, fringed by a steep sandy beach. Landing is easy during calm weather.

== Administration ==
The island belongs to Outer Islands District.

== Flora & Fauna ==
The island has been identified as an Important Bird Area (IBA) by BirdLife International because it is one of only three known locations in Seychelles which are nesting sites of Roseate terns (about 150 pairs). Also spotted are Sooty terns (about 5000 pairs) and Brown noddies (about 1000 pairs). All three species breed in dense colonies during the south-east monsoon season. green and hawksbill sea turtles also nest there.

== Image gallery ==
Map 1

District Map
