= Northern Coral Group =

Coordinates: 3°47′S 55°26′E

Location of the Northern Coral Group in the Indian Ocean

Northern Coral Group is a collective term for two islands of Inner Islands of the Seychelles, lying in the north of the island nation, between 92 and 102 kilometers north of the capital, Victoria, on Mahé Island.

== Islands ==
Two widely separated islands, with a distance of 53 km from one another, make up the Northern Coral Group. They are both sand cays, situated on the northeastern sides of pseudo-atolls:

1. Bird in the west
2. Denis in the east

== Population ==
Both islands are inhabited. The main settlement is St. Denis.

== See also ==
- Geography of Seychelles
