= North Island, Seychelles =

Island in the Seychelles

North Island
Nickname: Ile du Nord
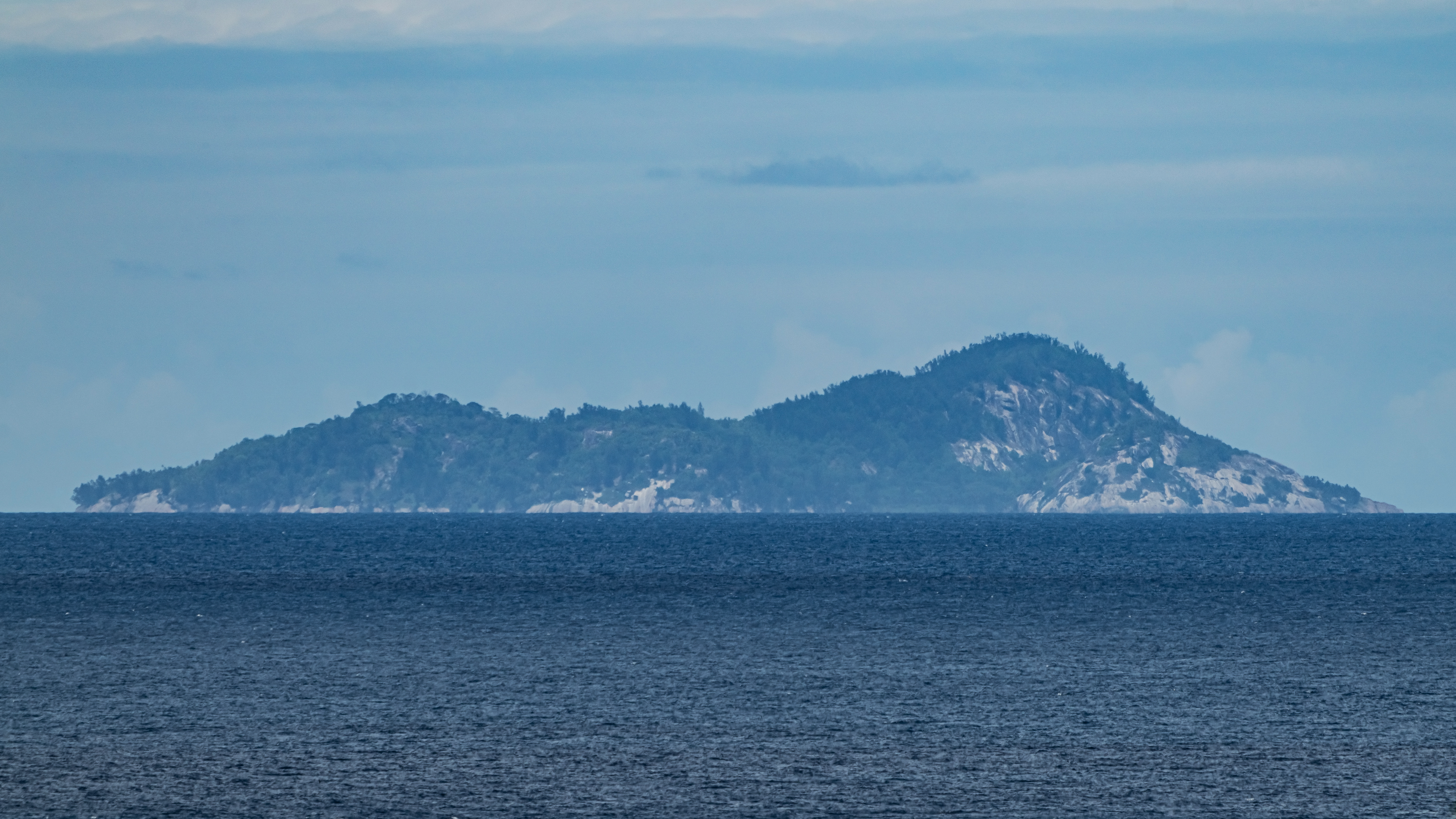
- North Island from Mahé

- Location within Seychelles

Geography
- Location: Seychelles
- Coordinates: 4°23′35″S 55°14′40″E
- Archipelago: Inner Islands, Seychelles
- Adjacent to: Indian Ocean
- Total islands: 1
- Major islands: North Island
- Area: 2.01 km^{2} (0.78 sq mi)
- Length: 2.1 km (1.3 mi)
- Width: 1.2 km (0.75 mi)
- Coastline: 6.66 km (4.138 mi)
- Highest elevation: 180 m (590 ft)
- Highest point: Grand Paloss

Administration
- Seychelles
- Group: Inner Islands
- Sub-Group: Granitic Seychelles
- Districts: La Digue and Inner Islands
- Island Group: Silhouette Group
- Largest settlement: North village (pop. ~130)

Demographics
- Population: 152 (2014)
- Pop. density: 75.6/km^{2} (195.8/sq mi)
- Ethnic groups: Creole, French, East Africans, Indians.

Additional information
- Time zone: SCT (UTC+4)
- ISO code: SC-15
- Official website: www.seychelles.travel/en/discover/the-islands/

North Island is a small granitic island (2.01 km^{2}) in the Seychelles.

== Geography ==
The island is one of the Seychelles' 42 inner islands. It is 5.8 km (3.6 miles) north of Silhouette Island, and 27 km (17 mi) north west of Mahé. The island has four beaches; East Beach, West Beach (or Grande Anse), Honeymoon Beach, and Petit Anse. The highest point of the island is 180 m. The perimeter measures in at 7.55 km, and the area is 2.01 km^{2}

== History ==
North Island was the first Seychelles island to record a landing by seafarers. An expedition in 1609 by Captain Sharpeigh and the crew of the English East India Company vessel Ascension reported that the island had a large population of giant land tortoises.

From 1826 until the 1970s, North Island was owned by the Beaufond family from Réunion. During this time, the island had a plantation for growing fruits and spices, as well as producing guano, fish oil, and copra. After the plantation was sold in the 1970s, the island fell into disuse and was taken over by feral animals and alien species of weeds.

In 1981, North Island was given to Marius Maier by his father. He intended to return the island to its former pristine state before human settlers arrived, including the removal of many unwanted animal and plant species, including pigs, rats, coconuts, casuarina, cows, Indian mynah birds, cats and a very intrusive weed called lantana. He re-introduced the Seychelles' natural flora and fauna, including giant tortoises, certain birds, and trees such as takamaka, badamier and the famous coco-de-mer palm. In 1982, Marius Maier and the villagers established a turtle nest monitoring center.

In 1997, North Island was purchased for US$5 million by Wilderness Holdings Limited, an ecotourism company from South Africa. They opened a private resort in 2003, aiming at the eco-tourism market, with 11 private villas. The resort has developed the island and increased its population.

North Island stood in for Tracy Island in the 2004 live-action adaptation of Thunderbirds. In May 2011, it was the site for the royal honeymoon of the Duke and Duchess of Cambridge.

In 2019, the North Island resort joined Marriott International's The Luxury Collection soft brand.

As of 1 July 2025, North Island is no longer part of the Luxury Collection portfolio. Having made the transition to independent operations under family ownership, marking the start of a new chapter for the private island resort. |

== Politics ==
The island is part of La Digue and Inner Islands district, it was part of Silhouette district until it was dissolved in 1977 following the decline in copra production on this group of islands.

== Economics ==
Most of the population is employed in the tourism business. Accommodations reserved for the permanent staff are located near the island's center.

=== Facilities ===
The buildings of the island are either renovated coral buildings or were built from the removal of the unwanted trees on the island, during Marius Maier's plan. The resort has 10 standard villas, and a special excluded (Villa North). A gym is in the village, a huge spa, library, and restaurant. The resort also features a boutique, a dive center, a main pool, and a bar.

=== Tourism ===
The island has many activities. mountain biking, scuba diving, kayaking, and deep-sea fishing. The resort offers a unique dining concept: the chef discusses guests' likes and dislikes upon arrival and bases available ingredients on this information. All food on North Island is either grown in the organic vegetable gardens, reared on the island or caught fresh from the sea.

== Gallery ==
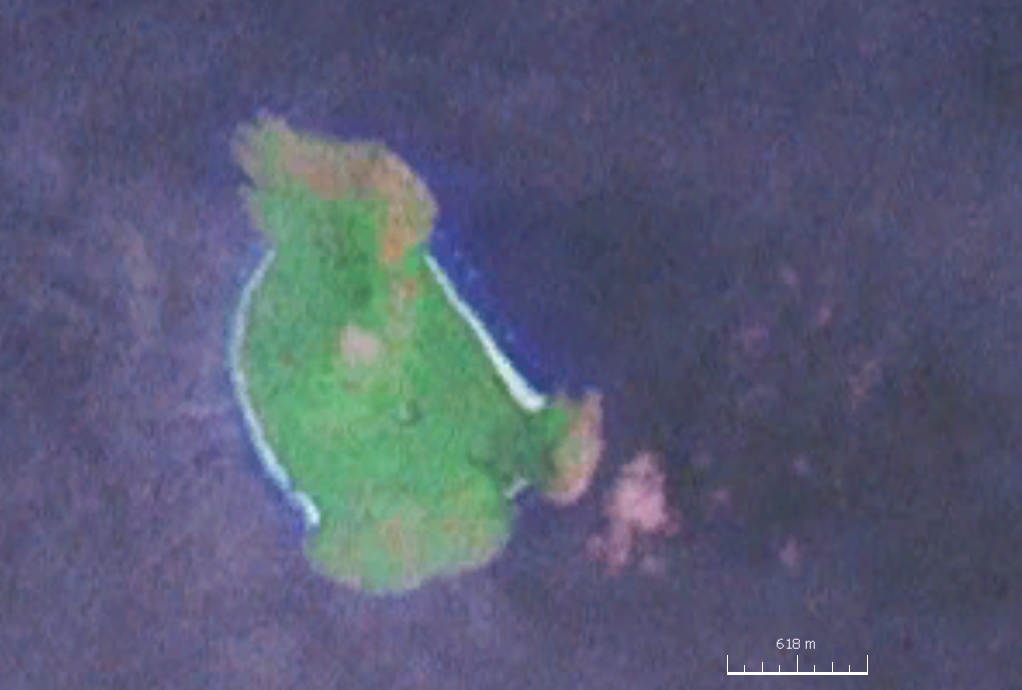
Satellite view

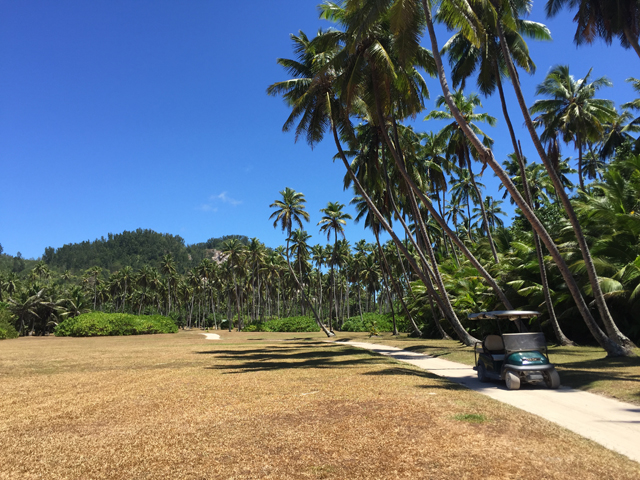
North Island landscape
