= La Digue and Inner Islands =

District of Seychelles

- Location within Seychelles

Geography
- Location: Seychelles
- Coordinates: 4°21′13″S 55°50′13″E
- Archipelago: Inner Islands, Seychelles
- Adjacent to: Indian Ocean
- Total islands: 15
- Major islands: La Digue; Silhouette; Fregate; North
- Area: 41.6 km^{2} (16.1 sq mi)

Administration
- Seychelles
- Group: Inner Islands
- Sub-Group: Granitic Seychelles
- Districts: La Digue and Inner Islands
- Largest settlement: La Passe (pop. c. 2200)

Demographics
- Population: 3506 (2014)
- Ethnic groups: Creole, French, East Africans, Indians.

Additional information
- Time zone: SCT (UTC+4)
- ISO code: SC-15
- Official website: www.seychelles.travel/en/discover/the-islands/

La Digue and Inner Islands is one of the 26 districts of Seychelles. It consists of the island of La Digue and assorted smaller islands of the Inner Islands.

== Geography ==
La Digue and Inner Islands district has an area of 41.6 square kilometres (16.1 mi^{2}) and a population of 3506 as of 2012. The population density is 83.8 inhabitants/km^{2}. It is located in the Inner Islands. Most of the islands of the district belong to the Granitic Seychelles.

== Administration ==
The district was created in 1994 when the government united the former La Digue District and Silhouette District. It is managed by a district administrator, which is seated in the main village of La Passe.

Since 1994 the district has a local government, which is a unit of the Ministry of Local Government, Youth and Sports. The unit's role is to promote the availability of public services at the local level. The district's motto is Avancons lentement mais surement ('Advance slowly but surely').

== List of islands ==
Nr.	Island	Capital	Area (km^{2})	Population (2012 Census)
01	Bird Island	Bird Village	0.94	38
02	Denis Island	St. Denis	1.43	80
03	Félicité Island	La Penice	2.68	20
04	Frégate Island	Marina	2.07	214
05	Iles Soeurs (Grande Soeur, Petite Soeur)	Grande Soeur	1.13	2
06	La Digue	La Passe	10.08	2800
07	Marianne Island	Anse La Cour	0.97	0
08	North Island	North Island Lodge	2.01	152
09	Other islands		0.3	0
10	Silhouette Island	La Passe	20.1	200
	Total	La Passe	41.6	3506
