= Marianne Island =

Island in Seychelles

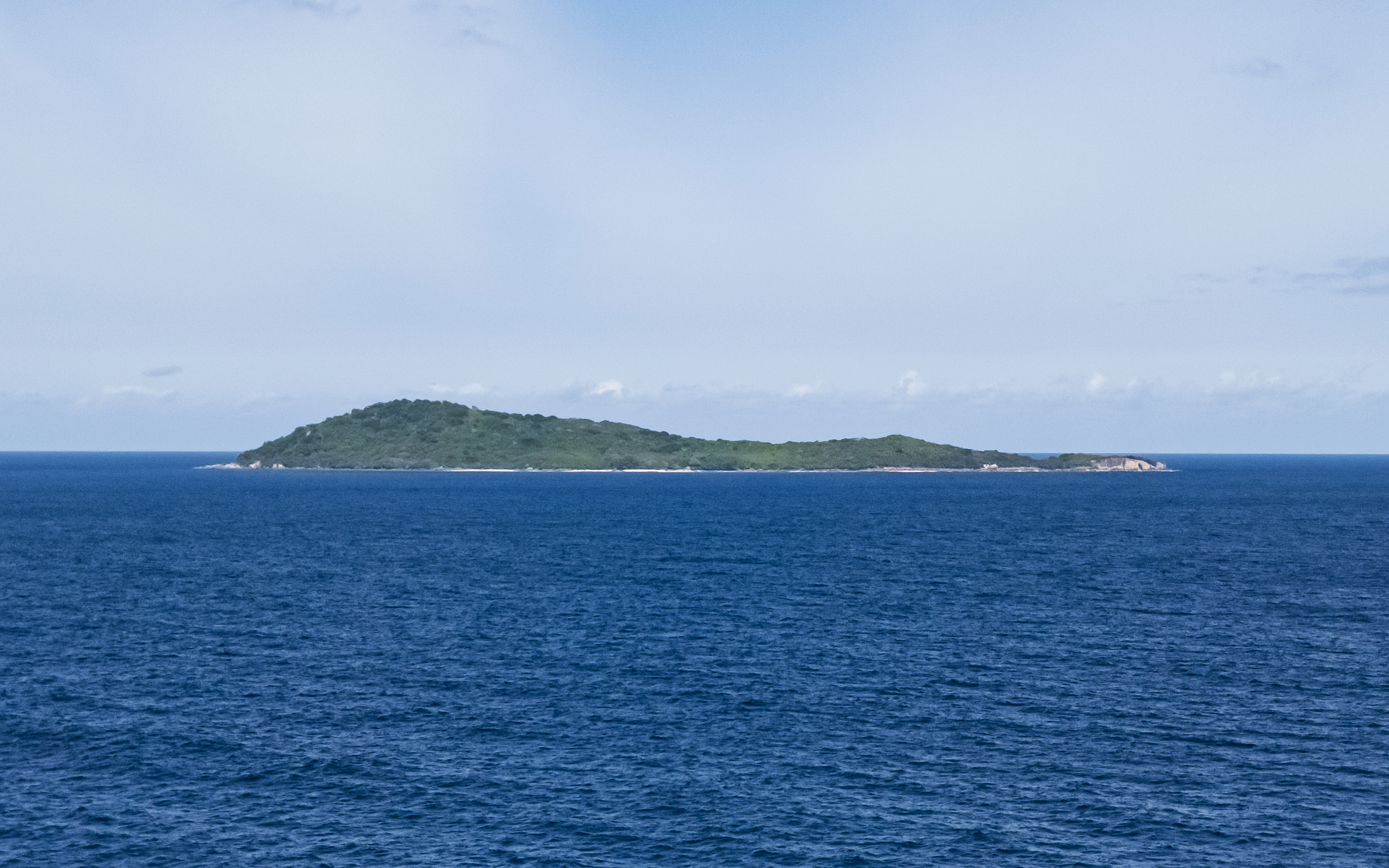
- Aerial view

- Location in Seychelles

Geography
- Location: Seychelles
- Coordinates: 4.34°S 55.92°E
- Archipelago: Inner Islands, Seychelles
- Adjacent to: Indian Ocean
- Total islands: 1
- Area: 0.96 km^{2} (0.37 sq mi)
- Length: 1.9 km (1.18 mi)
- Width: 0.75 km (0.466 mi)
- Coastline: 4.5 km (2.8 mi)
- Highest elevation: 130 m (430 ft)
- Highest point: Morne Estel

Administration
- Seychelles
- Group: Inner Islands
- Sub-Group: Granitic Seychelles
- Districts: La Digue and Inner Islands
- Largest settlement: La Cour

Demographics
- Population: 0 (2014)
- Pop. density: 0/km^{2} (0/sq mi)
- Ethnic groups: Creole, French, East Africans, Indians.

Additional information
- Time zone: SCT (UTC+4)
- ISO code: SC-15
- Official website: www.seychelles.travel/en/discover/the-islands/

Marianne Island is a small granitic island of the Seychelles. 94.7 ha (234 acres) in size, it is located 3.8 km ESE of Félicité Island. The island was a former coconut plantation, and on the western side of the island is a long beach. The southern tip of Marianne is known as a world-class diving location. The tallest peak on the island is Estel Hill, at 130 meters.

Presently, Marianne Island is uninhabited but is routinely visited by tourists and boaters. For much of the 19th and 20th century, farming and copra production took place on Marianne. There was a former settlement called La Cour, and in 1940 the island had 60 inhabitants.

There are a few species of gecko on Marianne, including the La Digue day gecko (Phelsuma sundbergi ladiguensis) and Phelsuma astriata semicarinata. Reportedly, the rare Seychelles paradise flycatcher (Terpsiphone corvina) is occasionally spotted on the island. Also, it was once home to the extinct Seychelles chestnut-sided white-eye.
