= Denis Island =

Island in Seychelles

- Location within Seychelles

Geography
- Location: Seychelles
- Coordinates: 03°48′13″S 55°40′13″E
- Archipelago: Inner Islands, Seychelles
- Adjacent to: Indian Ocean
- Total islands: 1
- Major islands: Denis Island
- Area: 1.4 km^{2} (0.54 sq mi)
- Length: 1.8 km (1.12 mi)
- Width: 1.3 km (0.81 mi)
- Coastline: 5.2 km (3.23 mi)

Administration
- Seychelles
- Group: Inner Islands
- Sub-Group: Northern Coral Group
- Districts: La Digue and Inner Islands
- Largest settlement: St. Denis (pop. 80)

Demographics
- Population: 80 (2014)
- Pop. density: 57.1/km^{2} (147.9/sq mi)
- Ethnic groups: Creole, French, East Africans, Indians.

Additional information
- Time zone: SCT (UTC+4)
- ISO code: SC-15
- Official website: www.seychelles.travel/en/discover/the-islands/
- Denis Island Lighthouse
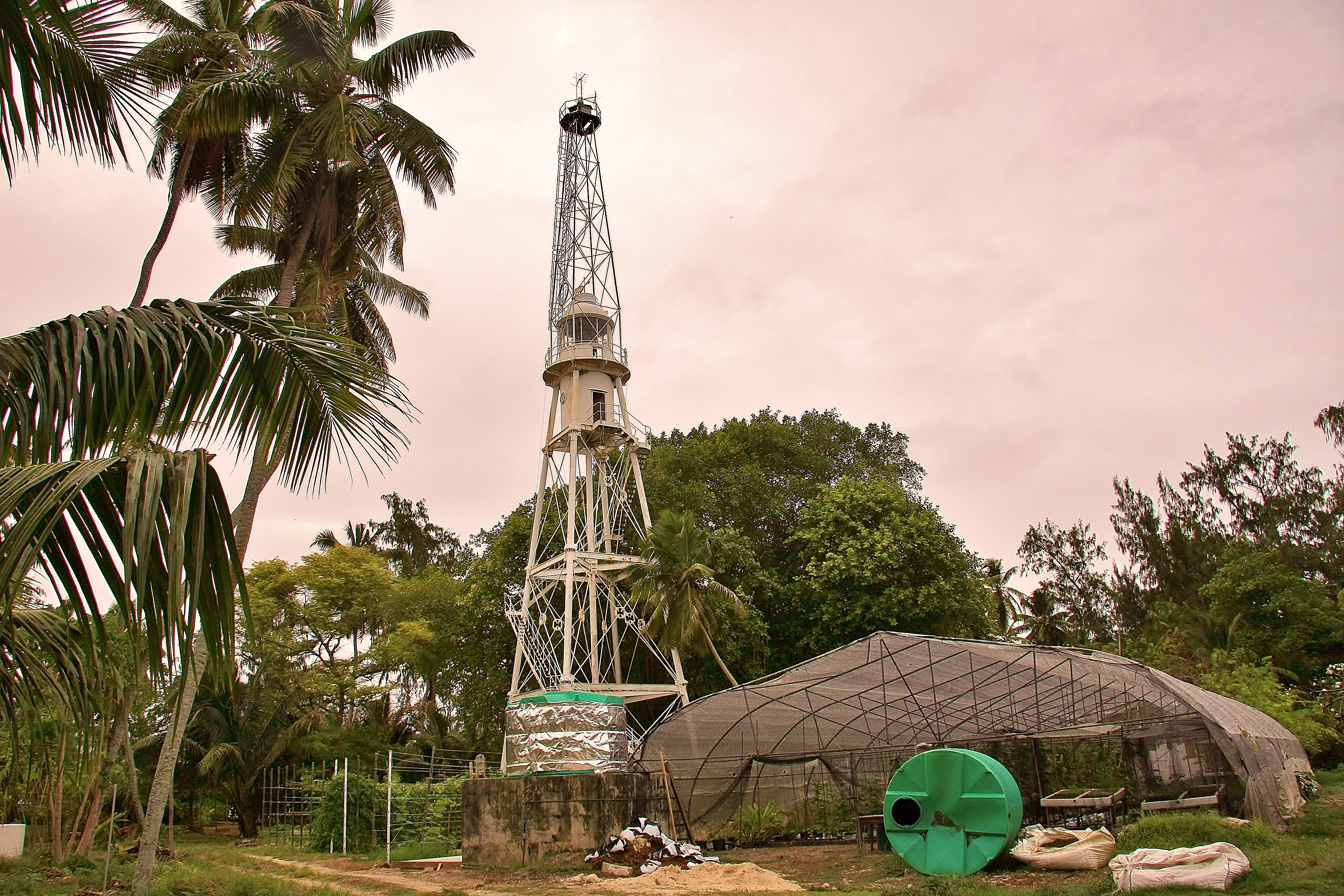
- Constructed: 1883 (first), 1910 (current)
- Construction: metal skeletal tower
- Height: 27 m (89 ft)
- Shape: 2-stage skeletal tower with balcony and lantern
- Markings: White
- Power source: solar power
- Focal height: 37 m (121 ft)
- Range: 10 nmi (19 km; 12 mi)
- Characteristic: Fl W 5s

Denis Island is the second northeasternmost island in the Seychelles. It is 60 kilometres (37 mi) north of Mahé and lies at the northern edge of the Seychelles bank, along with the nearby Bird Island, which is the northernmost Seychelles island. The 1.4 km^{2} (0.54 sq mi) coral island was named after the French Navy officer Denis de Trobriand, who explored it in 1773. Denis Island is privately owned and has a short airstrip. It has a holiday resort with 23 guest chalets.

A lighthouse built in 1910 still stands on the northern edge of the island. There is also a chapel named Chapel St. Denis.

The island has an abundance of coconut palms, Takamaka and Casuarina trees. In 2004, 47 Seychelles fodies from Fregate Island and 58 Seychelles warblers from Cousin Island were relocated to Denis as part of a Nature Seychelles conservation project.

The island has been designated a cay, in the Seychelles Archipelago.

== See also ==
- List of lighthouses in Seychelles

== Gallery ==
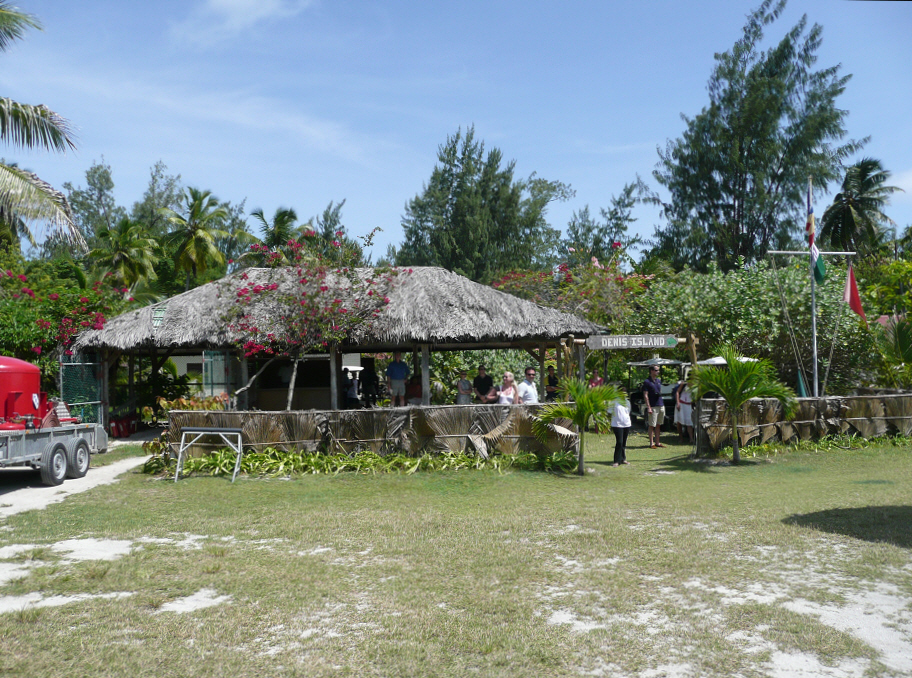
The entrance to the grounds of the Denis Island Resort, as viewed from the airstrip.

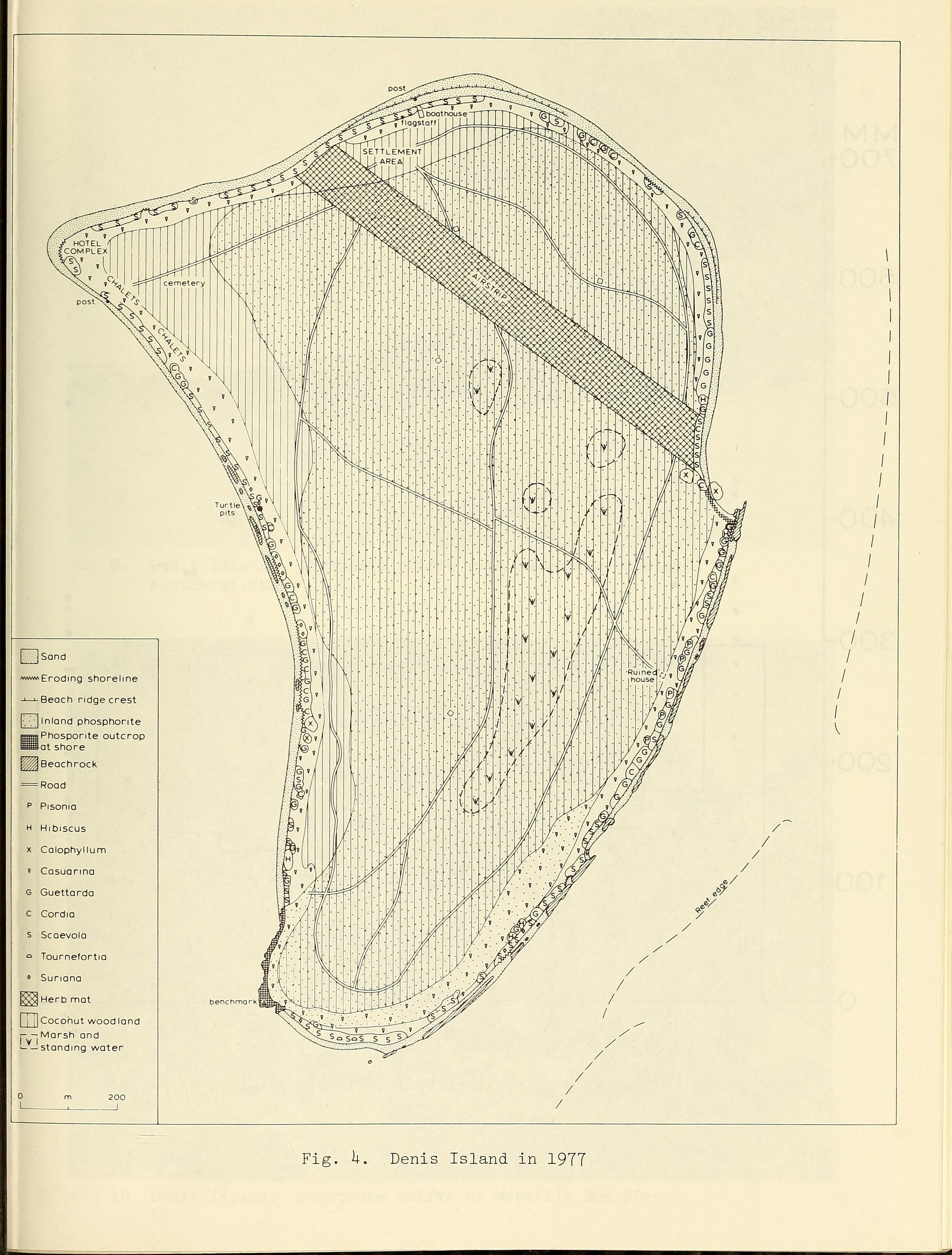
Map of Denis Island
