= Boudeuse Cay =

Nickname: King Ross Cay
- Location within Seychelles

Geography
- Location: Indian Ocean
- Coordinates: 06°05′S 52°53′E
- Archipelago: Seychelles
- Adjacent to: Indian Ocean
- Total islands: 1
- Major islands: Boudeuse Cay
- Area: 0.03 km^{2} (0.012 sq mi)
- Length: 0.28 km (0.174 mi)
- Width: 0.11 km (0.068 mi)
- Coastline: 0.7 km (0.43 mi)
- Highest elevation: 4.6 m (15.1 ft)

Administration
- Seychelles
- Group: Outer Islands
- Sub-Group: Amirante Islands
- Districts: Outer Islands District

Demographics
- Population: 0 (2014)
- Pop. density: 0/km^{2} (0/sq mi)
- Ethnic groups: Creole, French, East Africans, Indians.

Additional information
- Time zone: SCT (UTC+4)
- ISO code: SC-26
- Official website: www.virtualseychelles.sc/index.php/culture/2013-08-21-09-23-55/seychelles-archipelago-part-v

Boudeuse Cay is an uninhabited islet lying at the western edge of the Amirantes group, of the Outer Islands of the Republic of Seychelles, in the western Indian Ocean. It is located with a distance of 332 km south of Victoria, Seychelles.

== History ==
Boudeuse Cay was named after a ship used in Bougainville's famous voyage round the world, from 1766 to 1769. It was explored and named by the Chevalier du Roslan in 1771.

== Geography ==
Boudeuse Cay is the furthest southwestern feature on Amirante Bank, and the westernmost island of the chain. It is a one hectare sandstone platform island, 4.6 m high. There is a small sandy beach, but it is difficult to land because of heavy swells even during calm weather. The island has no trees, and no introduced vegetation, possibly making it one of the most pristine cays in the area.

== Demographics ==
Boudeuse Cay is uninhabited.

== Administration ==
The island belongs to Outer Islands District.

== Flora & Fauna ==
Boudeuse is one of the most pristine tropical coral cays in the world, with no introduced vegetation.

The island has been identified as an Important Bird Area (IBA) by BirdLife International because it supports a breeding population of about 4,000 pairs of masked boobies. Green and hawksbill sea turtles nest there.

In 2013, a small colony of brown boobies was discovered during a visit by scientists from Island Conservation Society. Once a widespread breeding species in Seychelles, the brown booby was wiped out except for a small number surviving at Cosmoledo. This is the first recorded recolonization of a Seychelles island by this species.

== Image gallery ==
Map 1

District Map
