= Félicité Island =

Island in the Seychelles

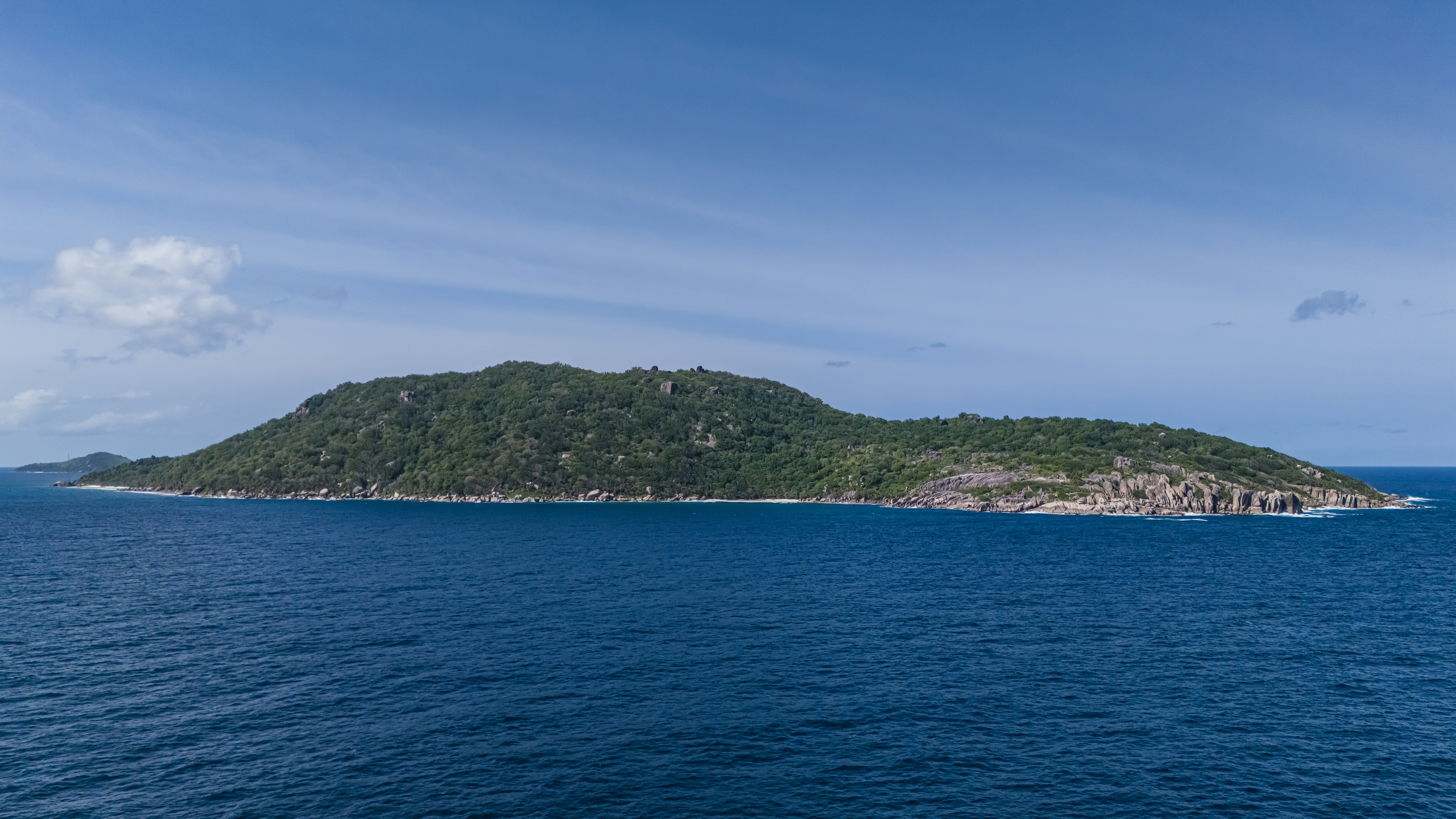

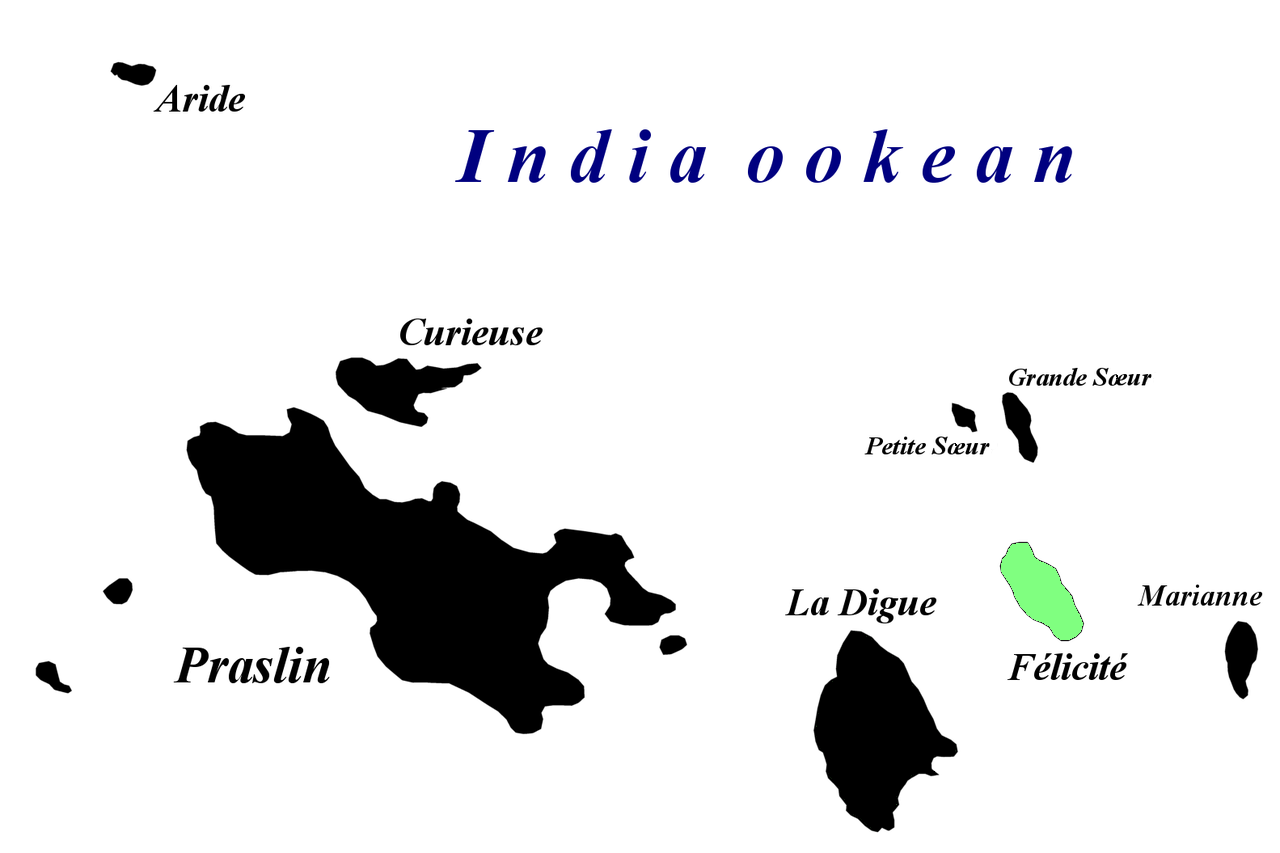
- Félicité Island is to the northeast of La Digue

- Location in Seychelles

Geography
- Location: Seychelles
- Coordinates: 4.32°S 55.87°E
- Archipelago: Inner Islands, Seychelles
- Adjacent to: Indian Ocean
- Total islands: 1
- Area: 2.68 km^{2} (1.03 sq mi)
- Length: 2.7 km (1.68 mi)
- Width: 1.3 km (0.81 mi)
- Coastline: 8.22 km (5.108 mi)
- Highest elevation: 213 m (699 ft)
- Highest point: Morne Ramos

Administration
- Seychelles
- Group: Inner Islands
- Sub-Group: Granitic Seychelles
- Districts: La Digue and Inner Islands
- Largest settlement: La Penice (pop. 20)

Demographics
- Population: 20 (2014)
- Pop. density: 7.5/km^{2} (19.4/sq mi)
- Ethnic groups: Creole, French, East Africans, Indians.

Additional information
- Time zone: SCT (UTC+4)
- ISO code: SC-15
- Official website: www.seychelles.travel/en/discover/the-islands/

Félicité Island is a heavy forested granitic island 4 kilometres (2 mi) east of La Digue in the Seychelles. It is the fifth-largest island in the Seychelles archipelago, measuring 2.68 square kilometres (1.03 mi^{2}).

Until the 1970s it was a coconut plantation that had a population of about 50. In the late 19th century, Félicité was home to Sultan Abdullah of Perak, who was exiled there by the British.

In 2007, the Seychelles government granted a 99-year lease for the then-uninhabited island, which was taken over by Singaporean real estate developer Kishore Buxani in 2013. Buxani and Mukesh Valabhji, a Seychellois developer, started the construction of a resort in mid-2013. Today, the Six Senses Zil Pasyon resort, with 30 villas and a spa, covers a third of the island.

Félicité and four granitic neighboring islands are considered "satellite islands" of La Digue. These four islands are routinely visited by tourists:

- Île Cocos, a tiny islet (.017 km^{2}) off the north coast of Félicité which has been part of a marine park since 1996.
- Les Soeurs (The Sisters), which consists of Grande Soeur at 0.84 square kilometres (0.32 mi^{2}) and Petite Soeur at 0.34 square kilometres (0.13 mi^{2}). For much of the 20th century they were coconut plantations.
- Marianne Island, an island of 0.96 square kilometres (238 acres) east of Félicité. The southern tip of Marianne is considered a "world class" diving location.
