= Poivre Atoll =

Group of islands in Seychelles

Poivre Islands
- Location within Seychelles

Geography
- Location: Indian Ocean
- Coordinates: 05°46′S 53°19′E
- Archipelago: Seychelles
- Adjacent to: Indian Ocean
- Total islands: 4
- Major islands: Poivre Nord; Poivre Sud
- Area: 2.78 km^{2} (1.07 sq mi)
- Coastline: 21 km (13 mi)
- Highest elevation: 3 m (10 ft)

Administration
- Seychelles
- Group: Outer Islands
- Sub-Group: Amirante Islands
- Districts: Outer Islands District
- Largest settlement: Poivre Nord (pop. 8)

Demographics
- Population: 8 (2014)
- Pop. density: 2.9/km^{2} (7.5/sq mi)
- Ethnic groups: Creole, French, East Africans, Indians.

Additional information
- Time zone: SCT (UTC+4)
- ISO code: SC-26
- Official website: www.seychelles.travel/en/discover/the-islands/outer-islands

Poivre Islands are a group of islands in Seychelles, lying in the Outer Islands of Seychelles, with a distance of 268 km south of Victoria, Seychelles.

== History ==
Poivre was named in 1771 by Chevalier de la Biollière after Pierre Poivre, the famous "Peter Pepper" and governor of Ile de France and Réunion (then Bourbon) from 1769 to 1772. He named Florentin island for the Grey herons (Florentin being the Creole name for this species), which are nesting on the island. In 2008, the small boat channel was enlarged. Since 2013 the Alphonse Fishing Company has been offering professionally guided catch and release fly fishing trips to Poivre.

== Geography ==
Poivre Atoll is near the eastern edge of Amirante Bank. Poivre Nord is joined to Poivre Sud by a 750-metre causeway crossing the reef flats, which is submerged at high tide. The total area of the reef is 20.24 km^{2} There are four islets on the reef (with land area):

1. Poivre Nord, 1.105 km^{2}, located at 05°44′48″S 53°18′20″E
2. Poivre Sud, 1.5 km^{2}, located at 05°46′18″S 53°18′22″E, and with two additional small projections:
  1. Florentin, 0.163 km^{2} located at 05°45′40″S 53°18′07″E
  2. Mozambique, 0.01 km^{2} located at 05°45′48″S 53°18′30″E

The large, elongated lagoon between the 4 islands is very shallow and dries out at low tide.

== Demographics ==
The village stands on the east point of Poivre Nord Island amid a clump of trees. In some sources it is referenced as Pointe Baleine village. The village houses a handful of caretakers and conservationists who watch over the precious ecosystem and maintain the unpaved grass aeroplane runway. The ruined buildings on Poivre Nord hint at a more grandiose past and are oddly justapositioned alongside the more modern habitable homes.

== Administration ==
The island belongs to Outer Islands District. Being an island with a small population, there are not any government buildings or services. For many services, people have to go to Victoria, which is a difficult task.

== Transport ==
Poivre Nord Island is bisected by a 1,100 metres (3,600 ft) unpaved airfield. The island is occasionally serviced by an Island Development Company (IDC) aircraft from Mahé.

== Economics ==
The inhabitants on the island are engaged in very small scale farming and livestock which are mainly for the island consumption.

== Flora and fauna ==
The island is known for its rich fish life.

== Tourism ==
There are several local contractors who offer Permit fishing trips to the island.

== Image gallery ==
Map 1

District map of the Outer Islands

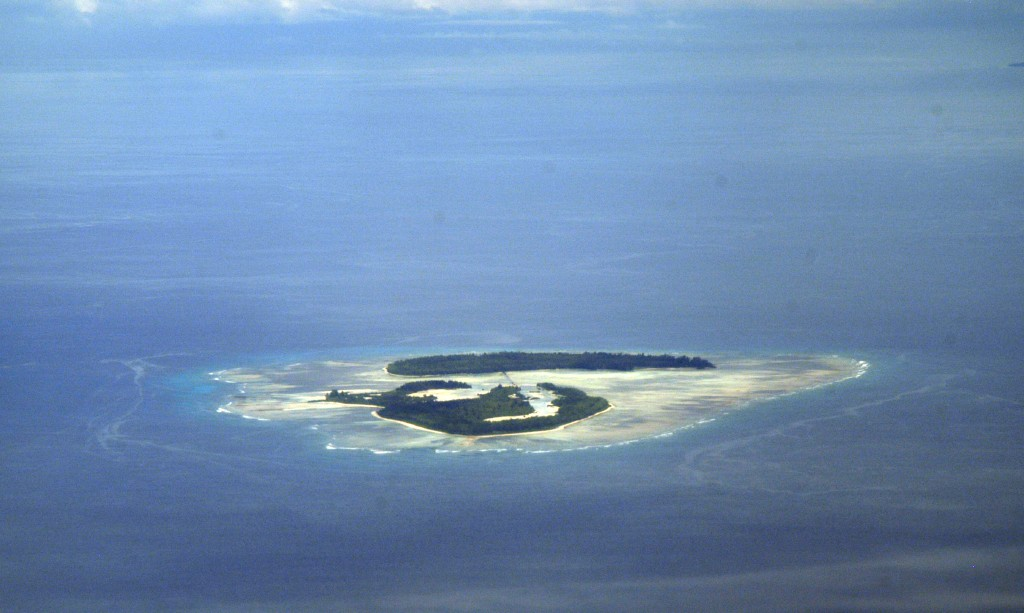
Poivre Atoll from the south

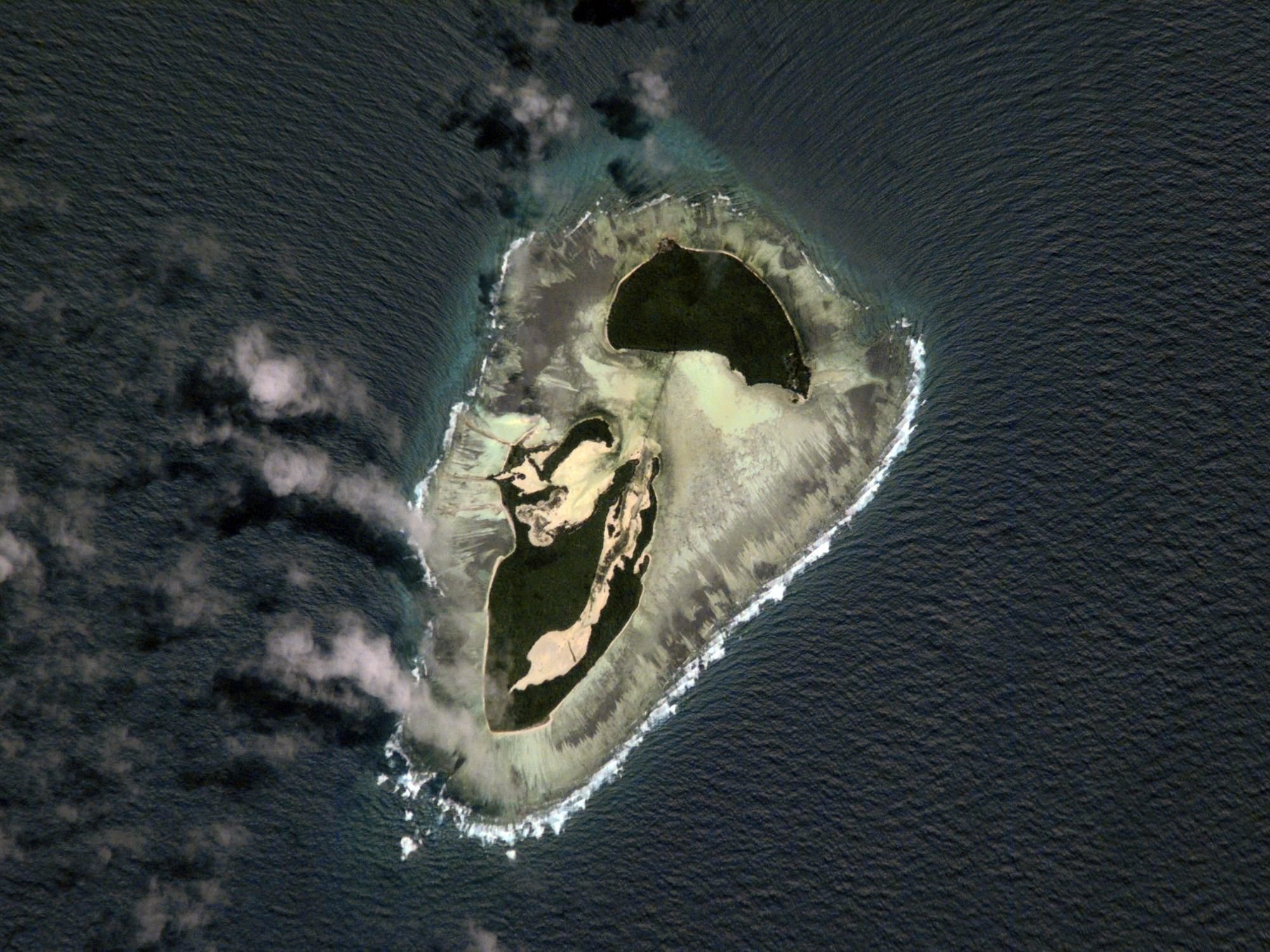
Sat image
