= Bird Island, Seychelles =

Island in Seychelles

Bird Island
Nickname: Île aux Vaches
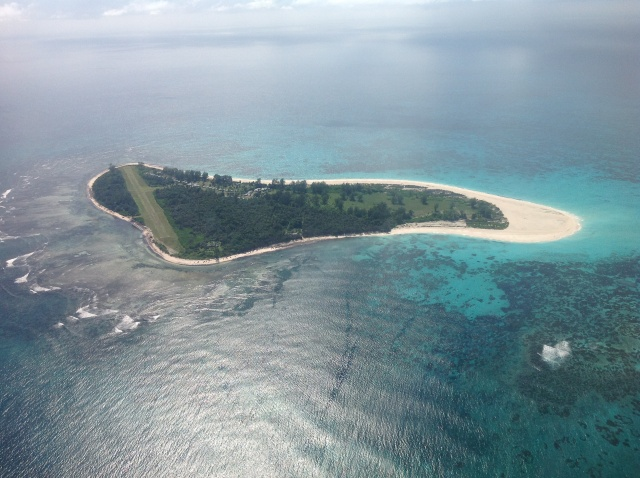
- Aerial view of Bird Island

- Location within Seychelles

Geography
- Location: Seychelles
- Coordinates: 03°43′13″S 55°12′13″E
- Archipelago: Inner Islands, Seychelles
- Adjacent to: Indian Ocean
- Total islands: 1
- Major islands: Bird Island
- Area: 0.94 km^{2} (0.36 sq mi)
- Length: 1.77 km (1.1 mi)
- Width: 0.75 km (0.466 mi)
- Coastline: 4.46 km (2.771 mi)

Administration
- Seychelles
- Group: Inner Islands
- Sub-Group: Northern Coral Group
- Districts: La Digue and Inner Islands
- Largest settlement: Bird Island Village (pop. 38)

Demographics
- Population: 38 (2014)
- Pop. density: 40.4/km^{2} (104.6/sq mi)
- Ethnic groups: Creole, French, East Africans, Indians.

Additional information
- Time zone: SCT (UTC+4)
- ISO code: SC-15
- Official website: www.birdislandseychelles.com

Bird Island is the northernmost island in the Seychelles archipelago, 100 km from Mahe. The 0.94 km^{2} coral island is known for its birdlife, including sooty terns, fairy terns and common noddies, and for hawksbill and green turtles. It is now a private resort with 7 chalet-villas It also contains a small weather station and a small landing strip, Bird Island Airport, which connects the island with Mahe.

Bird Island used to be known as "Île aux Vaches" due to the numerous dugongs (sea cows) that lived in nearby waters. Between 1896 and 1906, 17,000 tons of guano was removed from the island and exported to Mauritius as fertilizer. The island has been a coconut plantation, and for growing cash crops such as papaya and cotton.

In 1808, the French ship Hirondelle sank on a cliff off the northeast coast of Bird Island. Half of the 180 people on board died; the other half reached Bird Island. Six of them managed to reach Mahé. The others were then rescued and shifted to Mahé. In 1882, a passing British ship found two Africans living on the island, salting fish and birds.

Since 1967 the island has been privately owned by a Seychellois accountant named Guy Savy. Conservation measures have taken place such as protection of birdlife and hawksbill turtle nesting sites, eradication of feral rats and rabbits, and translocation of a population of Seychelles sunbird.

Bird Island is named in honour of its large colony of around 700,000 pairs of sooty tern that nest on the island. The birds arrive from late March, laying eggs in May and remaining until October before leaving the island. Another phenomenon, especially in October to December, arises from the geographical location of Bird Island on the northern edge of the Seychelles Bank, making it the first landfall for migratory Eurasian birds; the Seychelles Bird Records Committee has recorded many species new to the country here.

The world's biggest and heaviest free-roaming tortoise, Esmeralda, lives on the island. It weighs over 670 pounds (304kg) and is thought to be as much as 170 years old. Esmeralda was named by Lyall Watson.

== Gallery ==
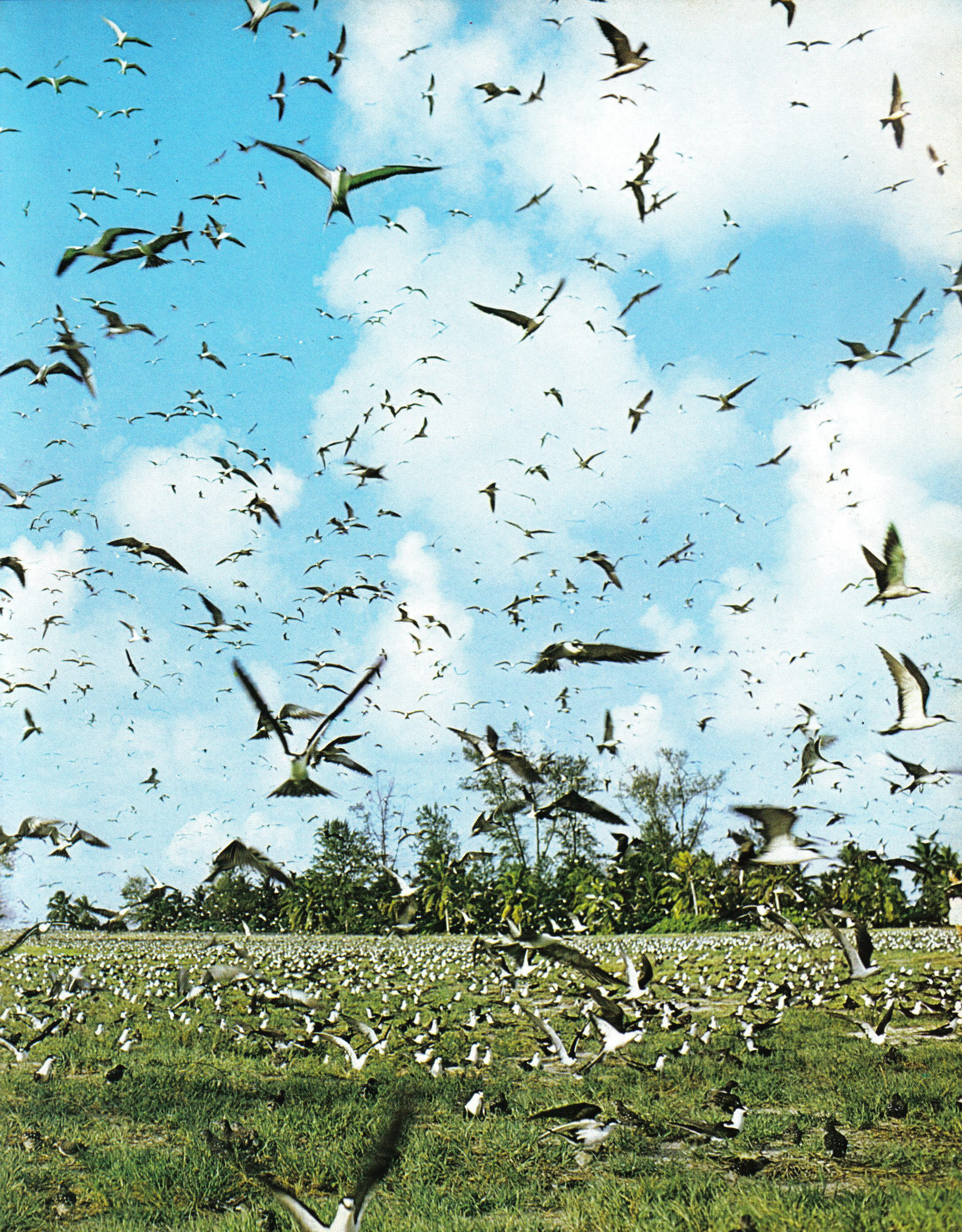
Flocks of sooty terns on Bird Island

Bird Island, Seychelles
