= List of companies of Seychelles =

Location of Seychelles

Seychelles, officially the Republic of Seychelles, is a 115-island country spanning an archipelago in the Indian Ocean, some 1,500 kilometres (932 mi) east of mainland Southeast Africa, northeast of the island of Madagascar.

Since Seychelles' independence in 1976, per capita output in this Indian Ocean archipelago has expanded to roughly seven times the old near-subsistence level. Growth has been led by the tourist sector, which employs about 30% of the labor force and provides more than 70% of hard currency earnings, followed by tuna fishing. In recent years the government has encouraged foreign investment in order to upgrade hotels and other services. At the same time, the government has moved to reduce the dependence on tourism by promoting the development of farming, fishing, small-scale manufacturing and most recently the offshore sector. The vulnerability of the tourist sector was illustrated by the sharp drop in 1991-92 due largely to the Gulf War. Although the industry has rebounded, the government recognizes the continuing need for upgrading the sector in the face of stiff international competition.

== Notable firms ==
This list includes notable companies with primary headquarters located in the country. The industry and sector follow the Industry Classification Benchmark taxonomy. Organizations which have ceased operations are included and noted as defunct.

Notable companies Status: P=Private, S=State; A=Active, D=Defunct
Name	Industry	Sector	Headquarters	Founded	Notes	Status	
Air Seychelles	Consumer services	Airlines	Mahé	1977	Commercial airline	P	A
Central Bank of Seychelles	Financials	Banks	Victoria	1983	State-owned central bank	S	A
Lignes Aérienne Seychelles	Consumer services	Airlines	Mahé	1986	Airline, defunct	P	D
Orion Air	Consumer services	Airlines	Mahé	2004	Airline, defunct 2008	P	D
Seychelles International Airways	Consumer services	Airlines	Mahé	1982	Charter airline, defunct 1986	P	D
Seychelles Marketing Board	Consumer goods	Personal & household goods	Victoria	1985	Importer	S	A
Seychelles Postal Service	Industrials	Delivery services	Victoria	1861	Postal services	S	A

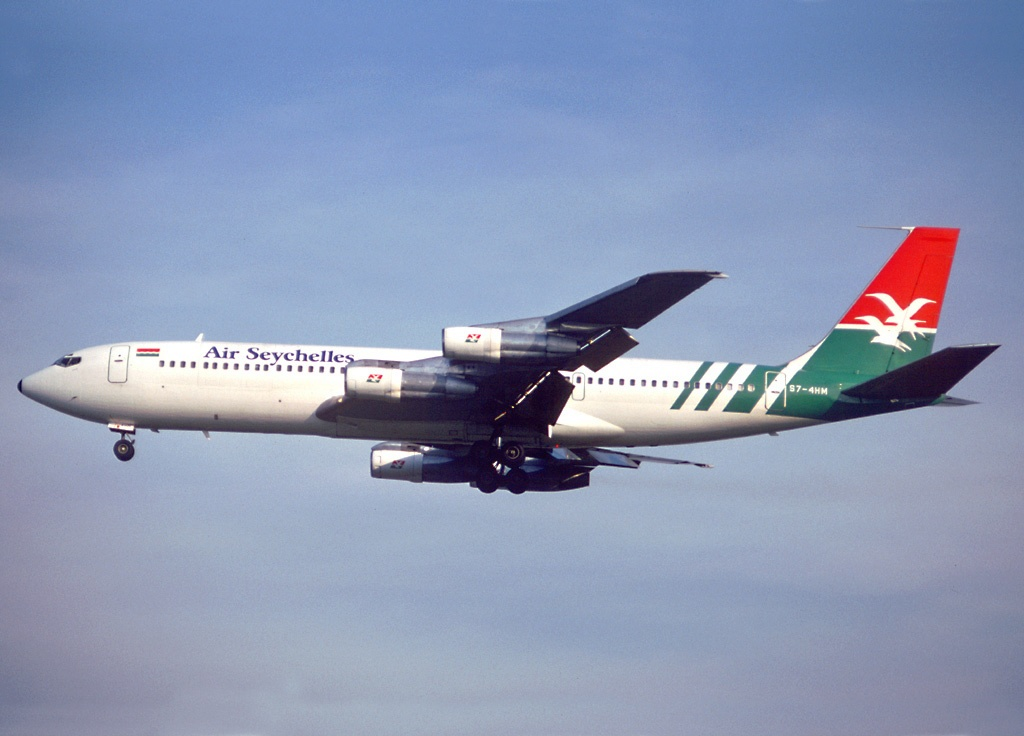
An Air Seychelles Boeing 707-320C on short final to Paris Orly Airport in 1989.

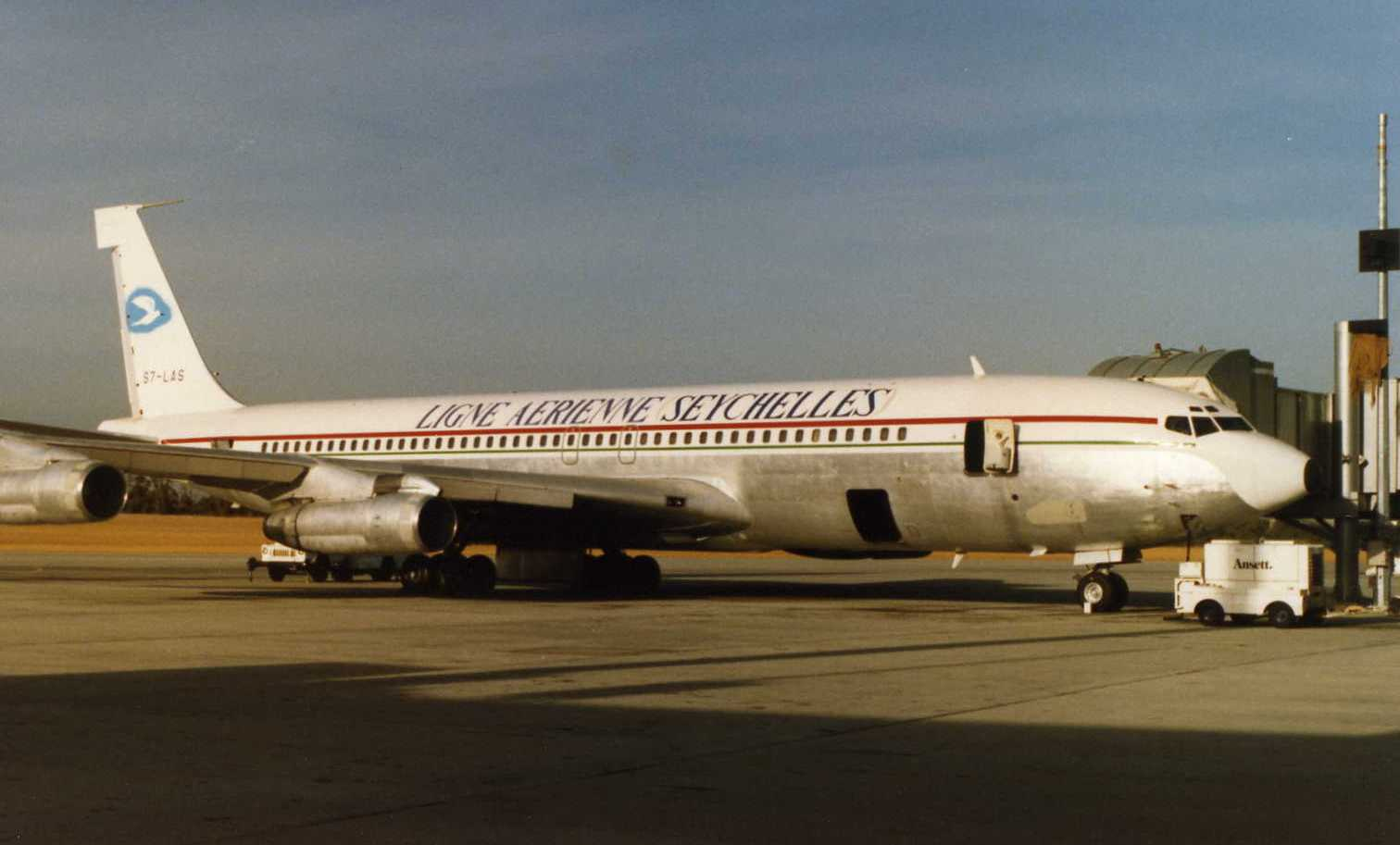
A Lignes Aérienne Seychelles Boeing 707

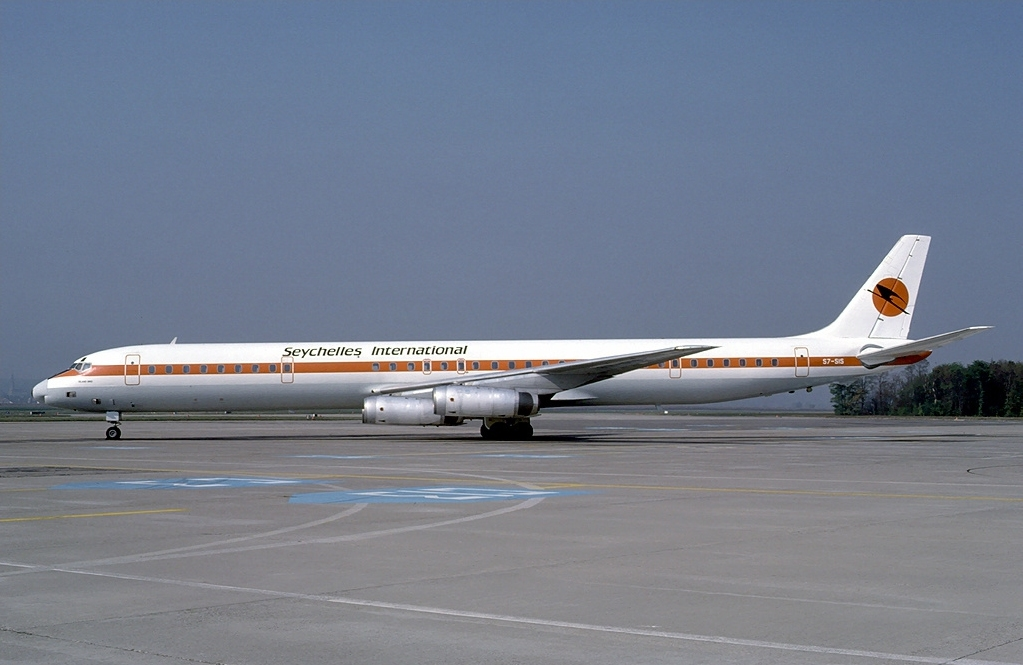
A Seychelles International Airways Douglas DC-8 at Basle in 1985

== See also ==
- Economy of Seychelles
- List of airlines of Seychelles
- List of banks in Seychelles
