= Desroches Airport =

Airport in Seychelles

Desroches Island Airport
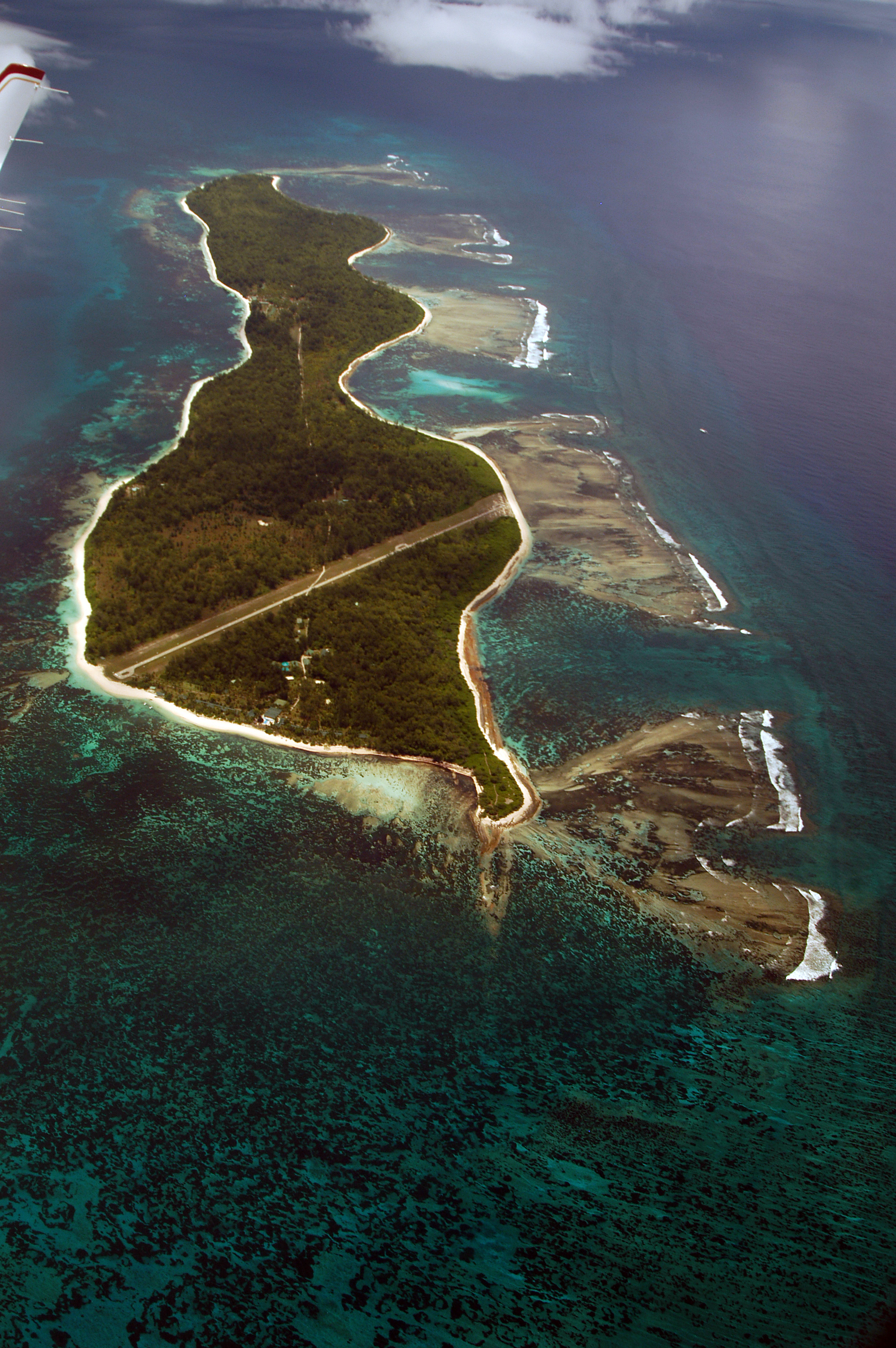
- IATA: DES; ICAO: FSDR

Summary
- Airport type: Private
- Operator: Island Development Company (IDC)
- Location: Desroches Island, Seychelles
- Elevation AMSL: 10 ft (3.0 m)
- Coordinates: 05°41′45″S 53°39′15″E

Map
- Location of airport in Seychelles

Runways
Direction	Length		Surface
Direction	m	ft	Surface
12/30	1,380	4,528	Concrete
- Source: WAD GCM Google Maps

Desroches Airport (IATA: DES, ICAO: FSDR) is an airport serving Desroches Island (Île Desroches) in the Seychelles.

Desroches Island, a former coconut and timber plantation, is the main island of the Amirante Islands, part of the Outer Islands. It is 230 kilometres (143 mi) southwest of Victoria, the capital of the Seychelles on Mahé island.

== Airlines and destinations ==
Airlines	Destinations
Air Seychelles	Charter: Mahé

== See also ==
- Transport in Seychelles
- List of airports in Seychelles
