= D'Arros Island Airport =

Airport in Seychelles

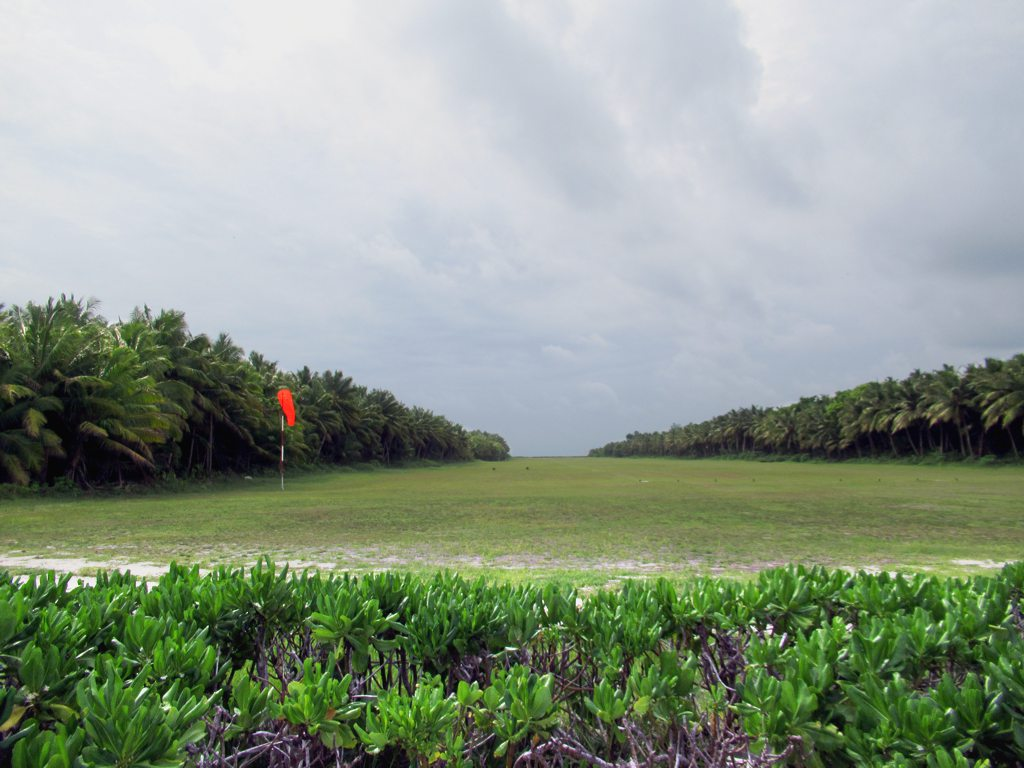
- IATA: none; ICAO: FSDA

Summary
- Airport type: Private
- Serves: D'Arros Island, Seychelles
- Elevation AMSL: 10 ft / 3 m
- Coordinates: 05°25′00″S 53°17′45″E

Map
- Location of the airport in Seychelles

Runways
Direction	Length		Surface
Direction	m	ft	Surface
16/34	800	2,625	Grass
- Sources: GCM Google maps

D'Arros Island Airport (ICAO: FSDA) is an airstrip serving D'Arros Island in the Seychelles. The airport is 255 kilometres (158 mi) west-southwest of the Seychelles capital of Victoria on Mahé Island.

The Darros non-directional beacon (Ident: DAR) is located on the field.

After its purchase in 2012, the island and the neighbouring atoll were designated a nature reserve in 2014.

== Airlines and destinations ==
Airlines	Destinations
Air Seychelles	Charter: Mahé

== See also ==
- Transport in Seychelles
- List of airports in Seychelles
