= Bird Island Airport =

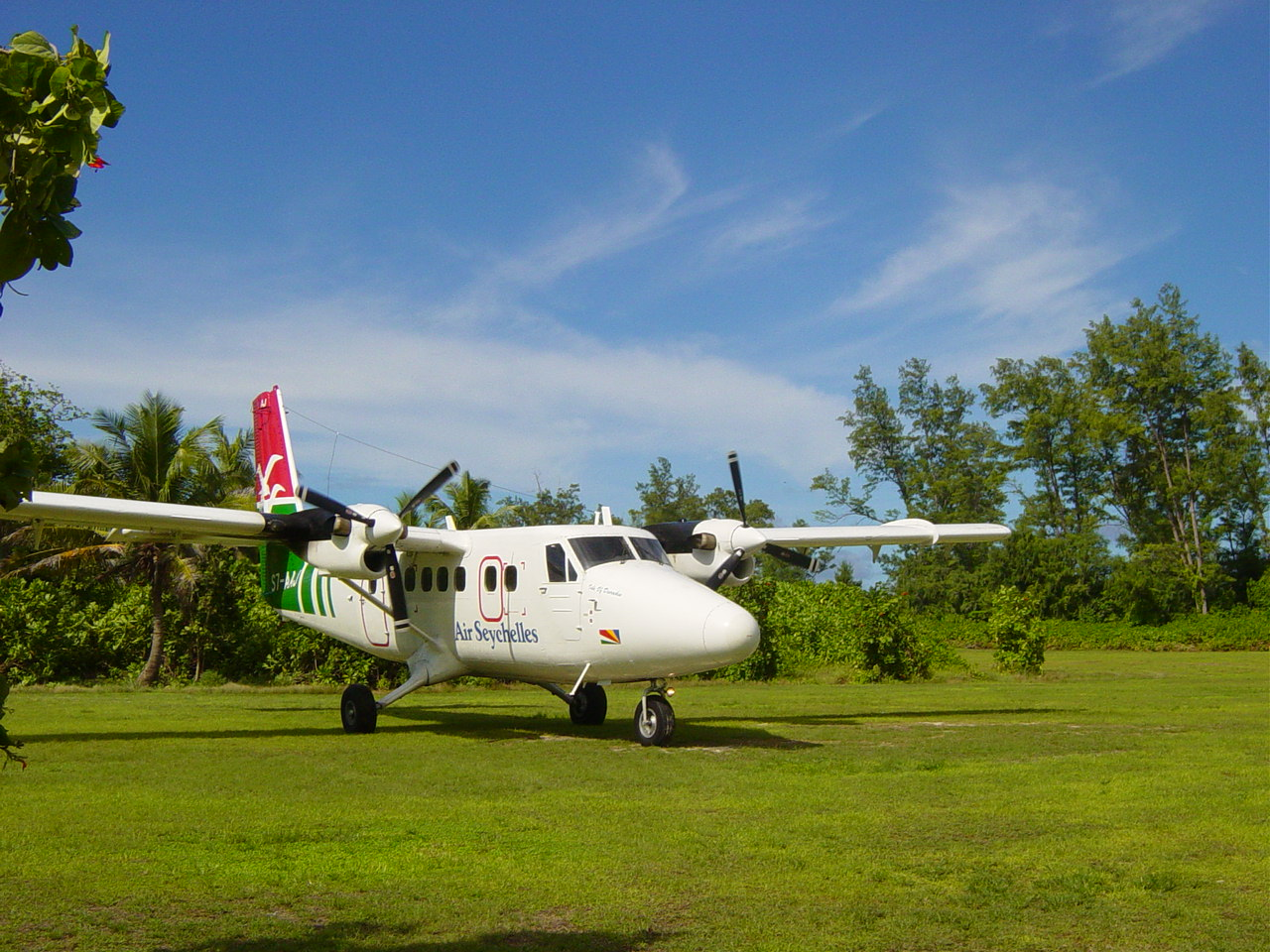
- IATA: BDI; ICAO: FSSB

Summary
- Airport type: Private
- Operator: Bird Island Lodge
- Location: Bird Island, Seychelles
- Elevation AMSL: 6 ft / 2 m
- Coordinates: 03°43′25″S 55°12′22″E

Map
- Location of Airport in Seychelles

Runways
Direction	Length		Surface
Direction	m	ft	Surface
06/24	920	3,018	Grass
- Sources: GCM Google Maps

Bird Island Airport (IATA: BDI, ICAO: FSSB) serves Bird Island, a small island 100 kilometres (62 mi) northwest of Victoria, the capital of the Seychelles.

The airport is served by Air Seychelles, which has chartered flights from Seychelles International Airport on Mahé. The flights are arranged by a hotel on the island.

== Airlines and destinations ==
Airlines	Destinations
Air Seychelles	Charter: Mahé

== See also ==
- Transport in Seychelles
- List of airports in Seychelles
