= List of airlines of Seychelles =

This is a list of airlines currently operating in Seychelles:

Airline	Image	IATA	ICAO	Callsign	Commenced operations	Notes
Air Seychelles		HM	SEY	SEYCHELLES	1979	
Islands Development					1980	
Zil Air					2007	Helicopter Operator

== See also ==
- List of airports in Seychelles
- List of companies based in Seychelles
