= Rat Island (Seychelles) =

Island in the Seychelles

Nickname: Brulee Island
- Location within Seychelles

Geography
- Location: Seychelles, Indian Ocean
- Coordinates: 4°40′S 55°32′E
- Archipelago: Inner Islands, Seychelles
- Adjacent to: Indian Ocean
- Total islands: 1
- Major islands: Rat
- Area: 0.009 km^{2} (0.0035 sq mi)
- Length: 0.1 km (0.06 mi)
- Width: 0.1 km (0.06 mi)
- Coastline: 0.4 km (0.25 mi)
- Highest elevation: 12 m (39 ft)

Administration
- Seychelles
- Group: Granitic Seychelles
- Sub-Group: Mahe Islands
- Sub-Group: Anonyme Islands
- Districts: Pointe La Rue

Demographics
- Population: 0 (2014)
- Pop. density: 0/km^{2} (0/sq mi)
- Ethnic groups: Creole, French, East Africans, Indians.

Additional information
- Time zone: SCT (UTC+4)
- ISO code: SC-20
- Official website: www.seychelles.travel/en/discover/the-islands/

Rat Island is a small unpopulated granitic islet (0.01 km²) in the Seychelles, Located 600 m east of the island of Mahé, near the runway of the Seychelles International Airport. the island is 1.3 km from other neighboring Anonyme Island. Rat Island is almost circular in shape, its length is 88 meters, width - 93 m. It has some low growing shrubs.

== Administration ==
The island belongs to Pointe La Rue District.

== Image gallery ==
Map 1

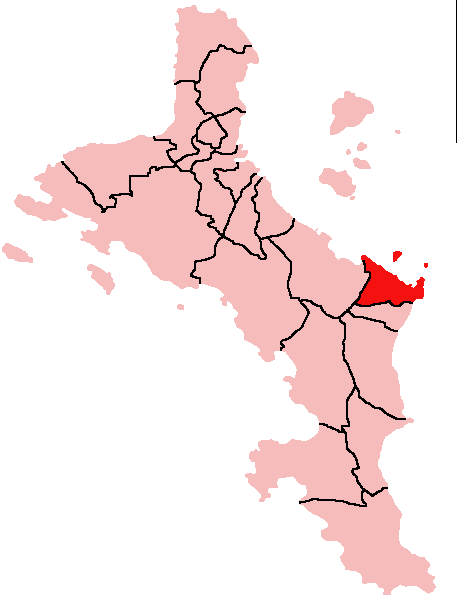
District Map
