= Pointe La Rue =

Coordinates: 4°40′S 55°31′E

- District

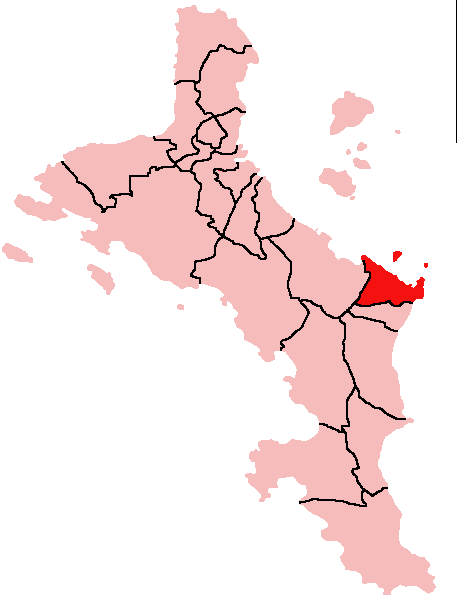
- Location within Mahé Island, Seychelles
- Country: Seychelles

Government
  - District Administrator: Gregg Leon
  - Member of National Assembly: Hon. Conrad Gabriel (US)

Population (2019 Estimate)
  - Total: 3,750
- Time zone: Seychelles Time

Pointe La Rue (French pronunciation: [pwɛ̃t la ʁy]) is an administrative district of Seychelles located in the eastern region of the island of Mahé.

The district has an area of 3.9 km^{2}. Its population rose from 3086 (census of 2002) to 3172 (2009 estimate).

The district is the location of Seychelles International Airport, with its runway running along the northeast coast. Anonyme Island and Rat Island are part of the district.

== See also ==
- Rosie Bistoquet
