= FSPL =

FSPL may refer to:

- Free-space path loss, in telecommunication the attenuation of radio energy between the feedpoints of two antennas
- ICAO code of Platte Island Airport, an airstrip serving Platte Island in the Seychelles
