= FSSD =

FSSD may refer to:

- Bally Sports San Diego, formerly Fox Sports San Diego (FSSD)
- Denis Island Airport, ICAO code FSSD
- Framework for Strategic Sustainable Development, see The Natural Step § Framework
- Franklin Special School District
