= Denis Island Airport =

Airport in Seychelles

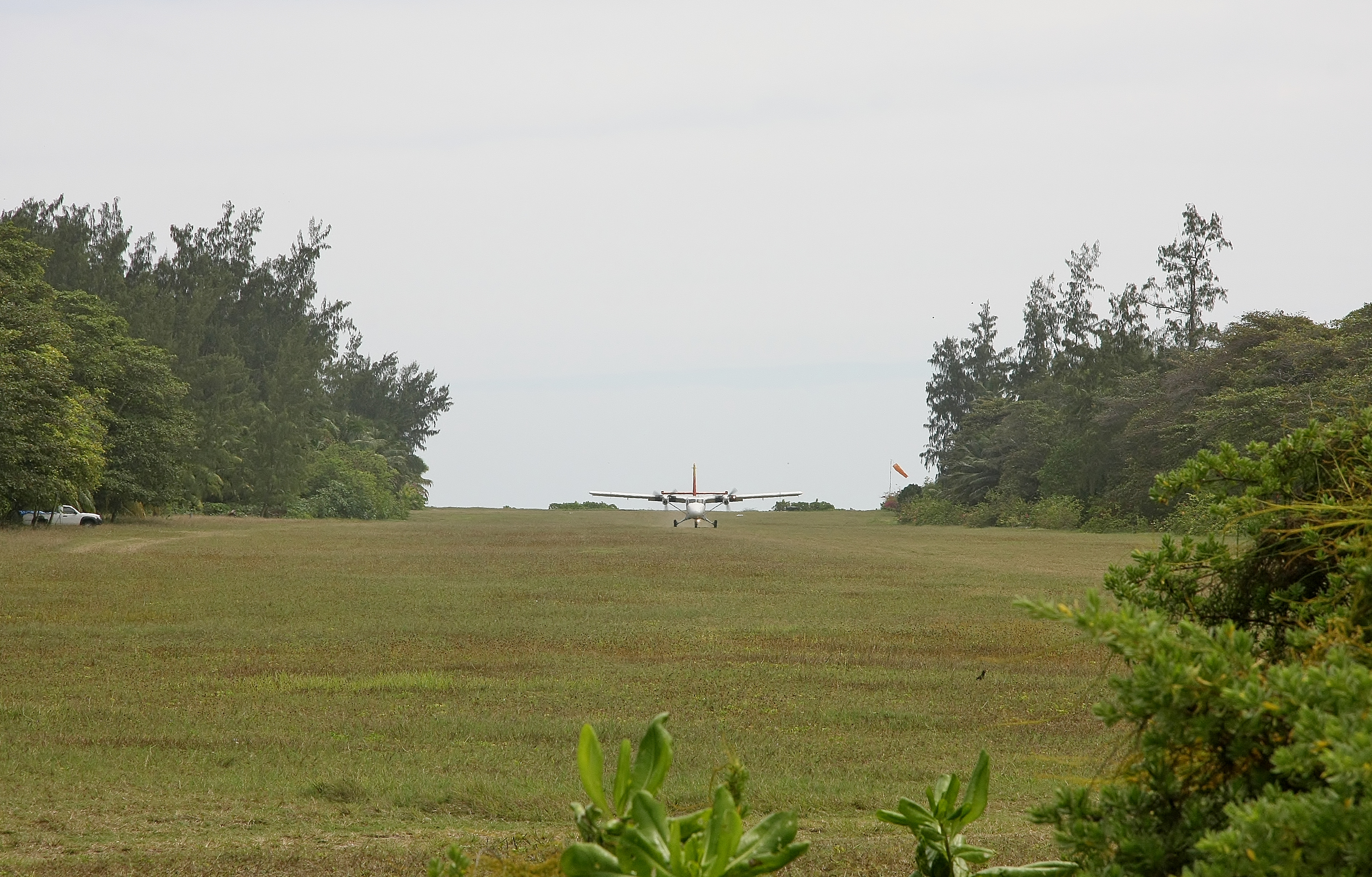
- IATA: DEI; ICAO: FSSD

Summary
- Airport type: Private
- Serves: Denis Island, Seychelles
- Elevation AMSL: 10 ft / 3 m
- Coordinates: 03°48′05″S 55°40′00″E

Map
- Location of Airport in Seychelles

Runways
| Direction | Length | | Surface |
| Direction | m | ft | Surface |
|---|---|---|---|
| 13/31 | 775 | 2,543 | Grass |
- Sources: GCM Google Maps

Denis Island Airport (IATA: DEI, ICAO: FSSD) is an airstrip serving Denis Island in the Seychelles.

The island is 94 kilometres (58 mi) north of Victoria, the capital of the Seychelles.

== Airlines and destinations ==
| Airlines | Destinations |
|---|---|
| Air Seychelles | Charter: Mahé |

== See also ==
- Transport in Seychelles
- List of airports in Seychelles
