= Naadir Hassan =

Seychellois politician and banker

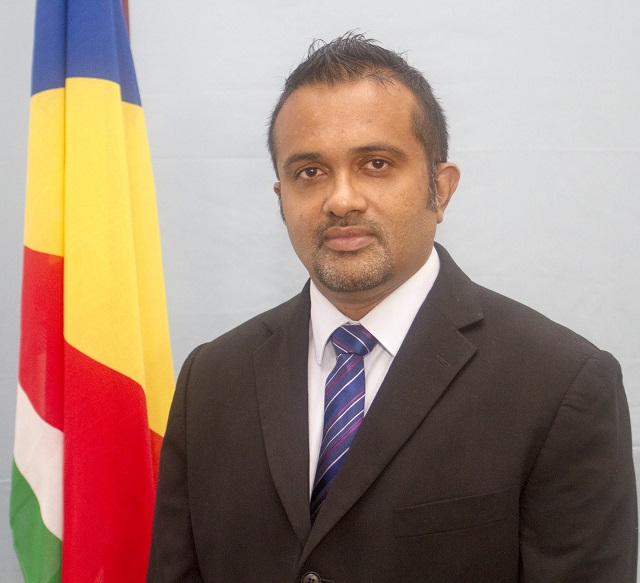

Minister of Finance, Trade, Investment and Economic Planning
- In office 3 November 2020 – 26 October 2025
- President: Wavel Ramkalawan
- Preceded by: Maurice Loustau-Lalanne
- Succeeded by: Pierre Laporte

Personal details
- Born: Naadir Nigel Hamid Hassan; March 1982 (age 43) Victoria, Seychelles
- Political party: Linyon Demokratik Seselwa
- Occupation: banker, politician

Naadir Nigel Hamid Hassan (born March 1982) is a Seychellois politician and banker. Hassan served as the minister of finance, economic planning and trade from 2020 to 2025.

== Biography ==
Naadir Hassan hails from Anse Royale in the Seychelles. He holds a master's degree in Banking and Finance. In 2005, he started at the Ministry of Finance as a policy analyst. Later he served as Head of Financial Surveillance at the Central Bank of Seychelles. In August 2020, he started to work for Cable and Wireless.

On 29 October 2020, he was elected Minister of Finance, Economic Planning and Trade and was sworn in 3 November 2020.
