= Farquhar Airport =

- IATA: none; ICAO: FSFA

Summary
- Airport type: Private
- Operator: Islands Development Corporation (IDC)
- Location: Farquhar Atoll, Seychelles
- Elevation AMSL: 10 ft (3.0 m)
- Coordinates: 10°06′35″S 51°10′35″E

Map
- Location of airport in Seychelles

Runways
Direction	Length		Surface
Direction	m	ft	Surface
13/31	1,179	3,868	Concrete and Grass
- Source: WAD GCM Google Maps

Farquhar Airport (ICAO: FSFA) is an airport serving Farquhar Atoll, part of the Farquhar Group of islands in the Outer Islands of the Seychelles.

The atoll comprises several islands; the airstrip is on Île du Nord (North Island). The runway length includes a 130 metres (430 ft) displaced threshold on Runway 31.

== See also ==
- Transport in Seychelles
- List of airports in Seychelles
