= Praslin Island Airport =

Airport in Seychelles

Praslin Island Airport Iles des Palmes Airport
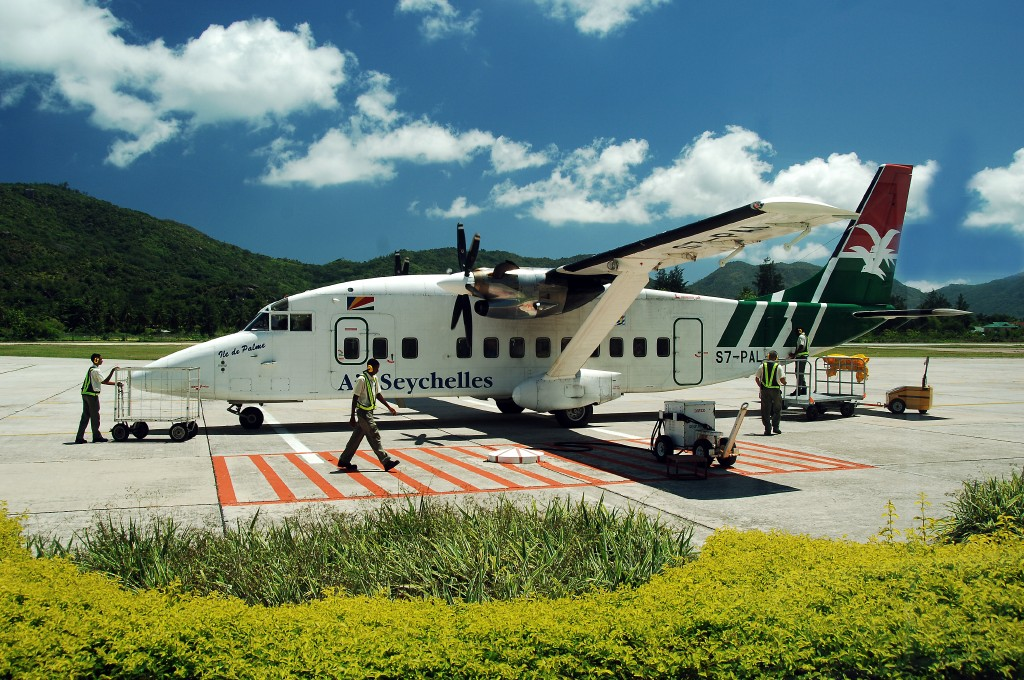
- IATA: PRI; ICAO: FSPP

Summary
- Airport type: Public
- Operator: SCAA (Seychelles Civil Aviation Authority)
- Serves: Praslin Island, Seychelles
- Elevation AMSL: 10 ft (3.0 m)
- Coordinates: 04°19′09″S 55°41′30″E

Map
- Location of Airport in Seychelles

Runways
Direction	Length		Surface
Direction	m	ft	Surface
15/33	1,405	4,610	Concrete
- Source: WAD GCM Google Maps

Praslin Island Airport (IATA: PRI, ICAO: FSPP) also known as Iles des Palmes Airport, is an airport at Grand Anse on Praslin Island in the Seychelles. It is served by Air Seychelles, which flies scheduled flights to Mahé and charters to the other islands in the Seychelles. The airport has the capacity to handle over 1500 passengers daily and over half a million passengers annually.

== History ==
During the late 1990s Praslin underwent an expansion to deal with increased passengers and larger planes. The airport was officially reopened on 3 June 2001. The cost of the renovation was around 40 million Seychellois rupees.

== Airline and destination ==
Airlines	Destinations
Air Seychelles	Mahé

== Statistics ==
Values from "Seychelles in Figures" for traffic between Mahé and Praslin:

Year	Passengers	Change
2014	158,271	▼1%
2013	160,262	▲60%
2012	100,302	▼42%
2011	173,736	▲8%
2010	161,045	▲6%
2009	152,614	▼28%
2008	212,784	▼16%
2007	252,545	▲6%
2006	237,199	▲11%
2005	214,055	▼0%
2004	215,074	▼6%
2003	227,830	0%

== See also ==
- Transport in Seychelles
- List of airports in Seychelles
