= Anonyme Island =

Island in Seychelles

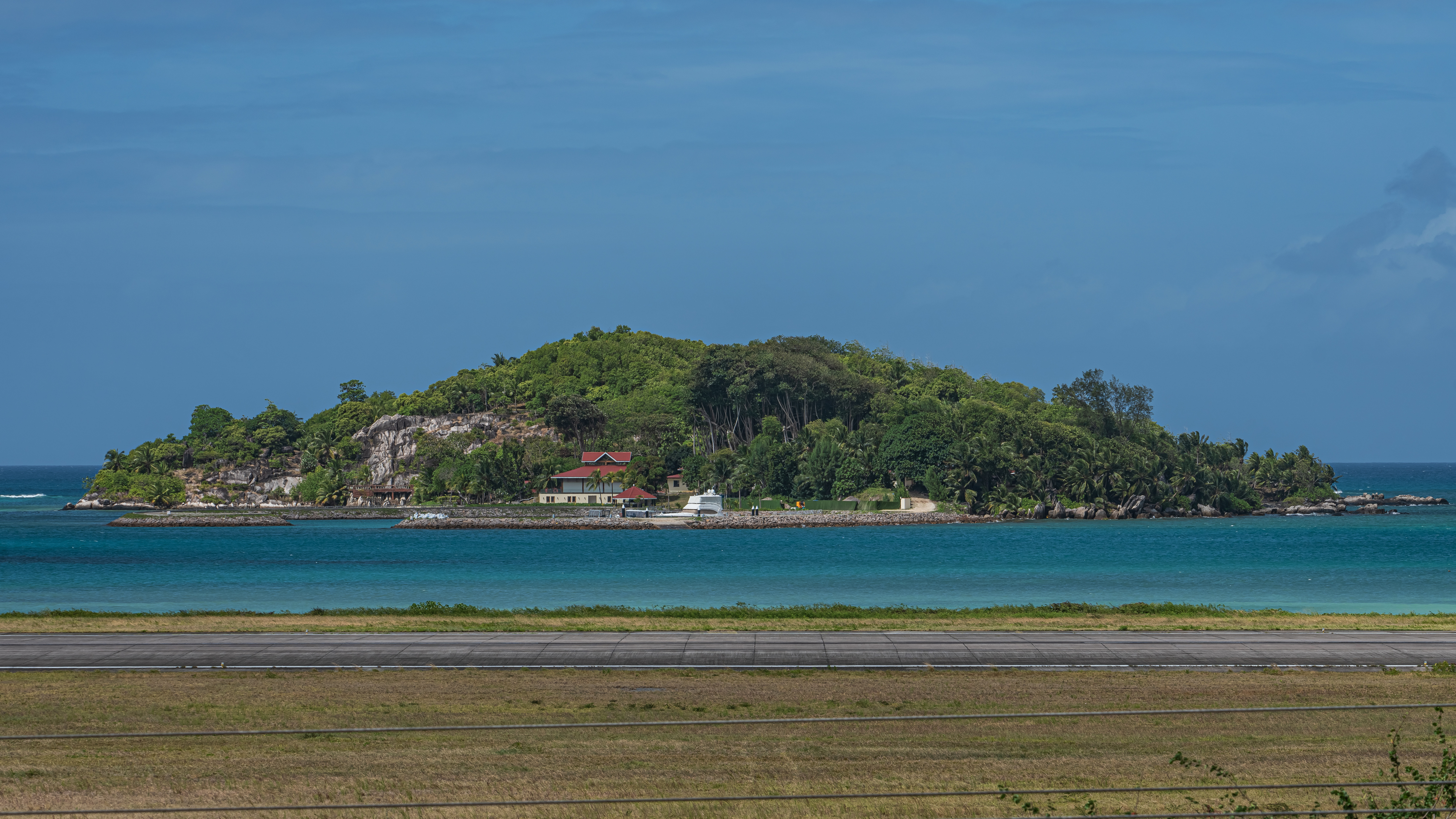

- Location within Seychelles

Geography
- Location: Seychelles, Indian Ocean
- Coordinates: 4°39′S 55°31′E
- Archipelago: Inner Islands, Seychelles
- Adjacent to: Indian Ocean
- Total islands: 1
- Major islands: Anonyme
- Area: 0.1 km^{2} (0.039 sq mi)
- Length: 0.45 km (0.28 mi)
- Width: 0.35 km (0.217 mi)
- Coastline: 1.45 km (0.901 mi)
- Highest elevation: 39 m (128 ft)
- Highest point: Anonyme

Administration
- Seychelles
- Group: Granitic Seychelles
- Sub-Group: Mahe Islands
- Sub-Group: Anonyme Islands
- Districts: Pointe La Rue
- Largest settlement: Anonyme (pop. 2)

Demographics
- Population: 2 (2014)
- Pop. density: 20/km^{2} (50/sq mi)
- Ethnic groups: Creole, French, East Africans, Indians.

Additional information
- Time zone: SCT (UTC+4)
- ISO code: SC-20
- Official website: www.seychelles.travel/en/discover/the-islands/

Anonyme Island is a small granitic island (0.1 km^{2}) in the Seychelles, lying 700 m off the east coast of Mahé, near the runway of the Seychelles International Airport.

== History ==
The island was named after a 180-ton sailing ship of the same name, which carried supplies between Mauritius and Réunion in the 17th century. Amid numerous ghost stories and tales of fabulous buried treasure, Anonyme plays a colorful role in the folklore of the islands that belies its small size. Once owned by the St Jorre family who were among Seychelles' earliest settlers, Anonyme was destined to play an important role in the construction of the international airport on Mahé, becoming the chosen location for the storage of the explosives needed to accomplish the task.

== Demography ==
The staff quarters are at the northern part of the island. Currently, the Warden and his wife are the only tenants.

== Administration ==
The island belongs to Pointe La Rue District. Being an island with a small population, there are not any government buildings or services. For many services, people have to go to Victoria.

== Tourism ==
Today, the island's main industry is tourism, and it is known for its beaches, especially Anse pimen vert, on the east coast where there is a small restaurant. Anonyme island is a privately owned resort with seven chalets

== Transport ==
The main means of transportation is bicycles.

== Cuisine ==
Fish is the main ingredient.

== Flora and fauna ==
Anonyme Island's plant life includes ironwood (bois noir) and banyan trees. Also several Aldabra giant tortoises make Anonyme their home. Plant life on Anonyme is plentiful upon its area of 10 hectares, and the island plays host to rare species of trees such as bois noir (iron wood) as well as a banyan tree reputed to be more than 100 years old. Anonyme boasts more than its fair share of bird life, and fruit bats are also to be found along with a number of giant land tortoises. The waters surrounding this tiny island are used for snorkeling and the isle has views of its neighboring inner islands.

== Image gallery ==
Map 1

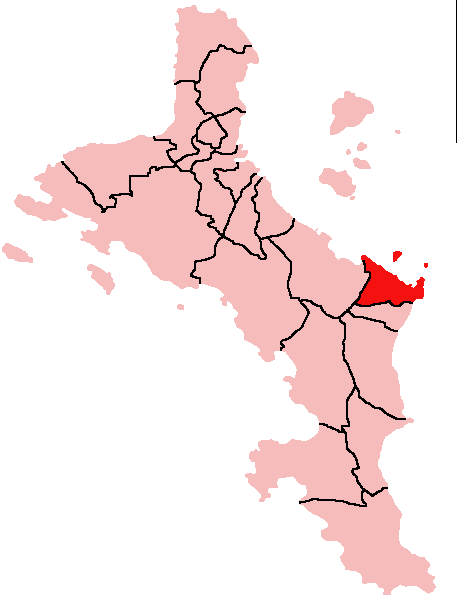
District Map
