= Rosie Bistoquet =

Seychellois midwife and politician

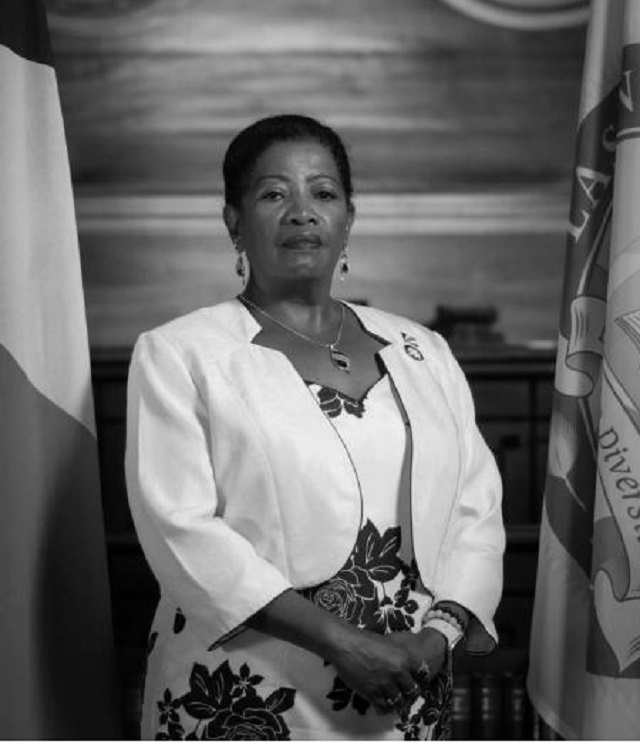
- Born: July 26, 1961
- Died: December 21, 2023 (aged 62)
- Burial place: Mont Fleuri Cemetery

Rosie Bistoquet (26 July 1961 – 21 December 2023) was a Seychellois midwife and politician who served as a proportionately elected member of the 7th National Assembly of Seychelles from Pointe Larue constituency on the ticket of Linyon Demokratik Seselwa (LDS). She was director for family health and nutrition and was noted to be the first health professional to develop HIV Integrated Biological and Behavioural Surveillance Survey among female sex workers in Seychelles, Angola and Mauritius.

== Career ==
=== Healthcare ===
Rosie Bistoquet started her career as a nurse and midwife in 1981 and rose through the ranks to the position of director for family health and nutrition. During her term, she advised the Ministry of Health primary methods of diseases prevention and improvement of child and maternal health, sexual and reproductive health and coordinated expanded immunization programmes against diabetes. This brought her to the attention of international organisations including the World Health Organisation, United Nations Programme on HIV/AID (UNAIDS, United Nations Population Fund (UNFPA) and Southern African Development Community (SADC). She was noted as the first health professional to develop HIV Integrated Biological and Behavioral Surveillance Survey method among female sex workers in Seychelles, Angola and Mauritius. Bistoquet was a volunteer executive member of the Red Cross Society of Seychelles for seven years.

During her career as a nurse, Bistoquet worked abroad in Angola, Namibia and Swaziland.

Beginning in 2016, Bistoquet served as the chair of the Nurses Association of the Republic of Seychelles (NARS). She also worked as a director at the Ministry of Health.

=== Politics ===
She was proportionately elected to the 7th National Assembly of Seychelles from Pointe Larue on the LDS party ticket in 2020. She served as the chairperson of the Committee on Communicable Diseases, HIV/AIDS and SRHR and was a member of the Standing Orders Committee, Democratisation, Good Governance and Human Rights Committee, Women Parliamentary Caucus and a Member of the Southern African Development Community Parliamentary Forum (SADC PF) until her death on 21 December 2023.

== Awards and recognition ==
In 2019, Bistoquet received a CEO Global Award for her contributions to the development of Seychellois society.

== Personal life ==
Bistoquet was from Pointe La Rue. She had two children.

== Death and investigation ==
Bistoquet was found dead at her home on 21 December 2023. Her funeral was held at the Immaculate Conception Cathedral in Victoria, and she was buried in Mont Fleuri Cemetery.

Following Bistoquet's death, the Seychelles Police announced they were treating the event as a murder. Her 37-year-old daughter was arrested as a suspect.
