= Seychellois rupee =

Currency of the Seychelles

roupie seychelloise (French); roupi seselwa (Seselwa Creole French)
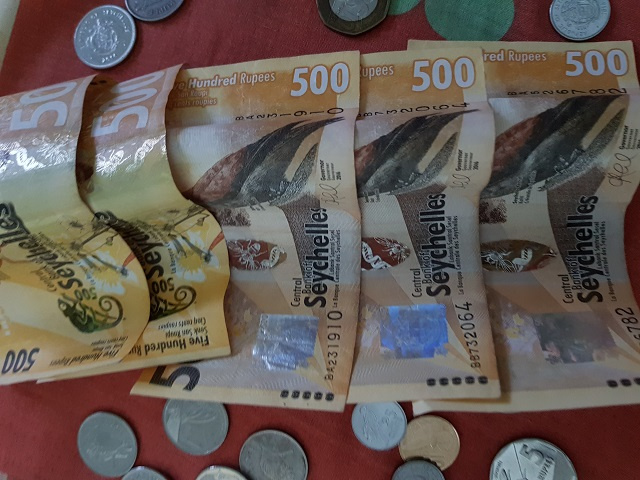
- Money of seychelles

ISO 4217
- Code: SCR (numeric: 690)
- Subunit: 0.01

Unit
- Symbol: R, SCR, SR, Re/Rs

Denominations
- Subunit
- 1/100: cent (c)
- Banknotes: R10, (Note: As of 2016, the R10 note was no longer issued, but still legal tender.) R25, R50, R100, R500
- Coins: 1c, 5c, 10c, 25c; R1, R5, R10

Demographics
- User(s): Seychelles

Issuance
- Central bank: Board of Commissioners of Currency (1919–1978); Seychelles Monetary Authority (1978–1982); Central Bank of Seychelles (1983–)
- Website: cbs.sc

Valuation
- Inflation: 2.3%
- Source: http://www.cbs.sc/Downloads/StaExcel/Prices%20Statistics.xlsx, September 2019

The rupee is the currency of the Seychelles. It is subdivided into 100 cents. In the local Seychellois Creole (Seselwa) language, it is called the roupi. The ISO code is SCR. Officially denoted with R (not to be confused with the South African rand) or SCR, the abbreviation SR is sometimes used for distinction. By population, Seychelles is the smallest country to have an independent monetary policy. Several other currencies are also called rupee.

== Banknotes ==
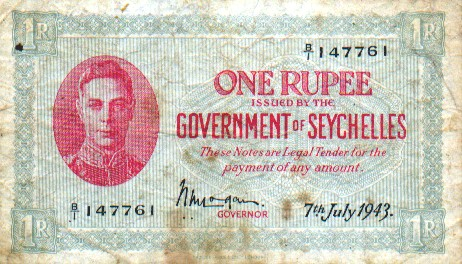
One rupee banknote of 1943.

=== British colony ===
The British Legislative Council authorised the establishment of a Board of Commissioners of Currency through the Paper Currency Ordinance of 1914, which was enacted by C. R. M. O'Brien, the Governor of the Colony of the Seychelles on 10 August 1914. In 1914, the government produced emergency issues of notes for 50c, R1, R5 and R10.

Standard issue notes began to be issued in 1918, with notes for 50c and R1, followed by R5, R10 and R50 in 1928. The 50c and R1 notes were issued until 1951 and phased out in favour of coins. R20 and R100 notes were first introduced in 1968, while the R5 note was replaced by a coin in 1972.

1968–1975 "Elizabeth II" Issue
Denomination	Obverse	Reverse
R5	Seychelles black parrot, Queen Elizabeth II	
R10	Tortoise, Queen Elizabeth II	
R20	Bridled tern, Queen Elizabeth II	
R50	Schoner, Queen Elizabeth II	
R100	Turtles, Queen Elizabeth II	

=== Independent republic ===
In 1976, the Seychelles Monetary Authority took over the issuance of paper money, issuing notes for R10, R25, R50 and R100. This series featured the first President of the Seychelles, Sir James Mancham and replaced all colonial notes issued prior to independence.

In 1979, there was a redesign, featuring a more socialist and modernised theme reminiscent of the René regime. This series was also issued by the Central Bank of Seychelles when it took over full responsibility in the same year.

In 1989, a new series was introduced with better security features and colours. Seychellois Creole text was added to the banknotes; prior issues have only been in English.

In 1998, another more high-tech series was introduced with a more practical, ergonomic design. This series later saw an additional R500 note first introduced in 2005.

==== 2011 update ====
On 7 June 2011, the Central Bank of Seychelles issued updated R50, R100 and R500 notes with improved security features. Each of the three banknotes has a holographic patch instead of a foil sailfish which currently appears on the notes.

- On the R50 note, the silver holographic sailfish alternates between the number 50 and an image of the Aldabra rail, a flightless bird.
- On the R100 note, the gold holographic sailfish alternates between the number 100 and an image of the Seychelles giant tortoise.
- On the R500 note, the gold holographic sailfish alternates between the number 500 and an image of the Seychelles scops owl.

Additional security upgrades include a 2.5-mm wide fluorescent security thread on the R50 note, a 2.5-mm wide colour-shifting security thread on the R100 note, and a 3-mm wide colour-shifting security thread on the R500 note. The notes are also protected by De La Rue's unique Gemini technology that fluoresces under ultraviolet light but appears normal in daylight.

The colour schemes of the notes have been revised, with the notes being more green, red, and orange, respectively, than the notes currently in circulation. The new notes also carry the year of printing, as well as the signature of Pierre Frank Laporte, the bank's governor. Existing notes remain legal tender and will be removed from circulation as they wear out.

==== 2016 changes ====
In December 2016, the Central Bank of Seychelles issued a new series of banknotes to commemorate 40 years of Seychelles' independence. The theme of this series is "Seychelles' Unique Biodiversity – the backbone of the economy".

== Exchange rate ==
The Government of Seychelles–issued banknotes from 1914 were equal to their face value in Indian rupees, although Seychelles currency is decimalized.

In 1936, the Seychellois rupee was fixed at a rate of one shilling and six pence in sterling, or £1 = 13 1/3 rupees. When British currency was decimalized in 1971, the relationship became 7 1/2 new pence to the rupee. Following the establishment of the monetary authority in 1978, until November 1979, the rupee was pegged to sterling at a rate of 1 rupee = 7 1/2 new pence.

Afterwards, the currency was pegged to a rigid basket of currencies, including the United States dollar, sterling, the South African rand, the Singapore dollar, the Japanese yen, the French franc, the Deutsche Mark, and the Italian lira (the latter three were eventually replaced by the euro in 1999).

In November 2008, the Seychellois rupee was devalued to R14.24 per U.S. dollar when the currency was floated.

Current SCR exchange rates
From Google Finance:	AUD CAD CHF CNY EUR GBP HKD JPY USD
From Yahoo! Finance:	AUD CAD CHF CNY EUR GBP HKD JPY USD
From XE.com:	AUD CAD CHF CNY EUR GBP HKD JPY USD
From OANDA:	AUD CAD CHF CNY EUR GBP HKD JPY USD

== See also ==
- Economy of Seychelles
- Mauritian rupee

== Notes ==
Preceded by: Mauritian rupee Reason: became a separate crown colony in 1903; Ratio: at par	Currency of Seychelles; 1914 –	Succeeded by: Current
