= List of banks in Seychelles =

This is a list of commercial banks in Seychelles, as updated in late 2024 by the Central Bank of Seychelles.

== List of commercial banks ==
- Absa Bank (Seychelles) Ltd, part of Absa Group
- Mauritius Commercial Bank (Seychelles) Ltd, part of MCB Group
- Bank of Baroda, part of Bank of Baroda Group
- Seychelles International Mercantile Banking Corporation (SIMBC) trading under the name "Nouvobanq"
- Seychelles Commercial Bank (formerly Seychelles Savings Bank)
- Al Salam Bank Seychelles Limited
- Bank of Ceylon, part of Bank of Ceylon Group

== See also ==
- Economy of Seychelles
- List of companies based in Seychelles
- List of banks in Africa
