= Chamery Chetty =

Seychellois politician

- Born: Chamery Chetty; 14 April 1927; Pondicherry, India
- Died: 1992 (aged 64–65); England
- Occupation: Politician

Chamery Chetty was an Indo-Seychellois and the first Minister of Finance of the Government of Seychelles.

== Early life and education ==
Chetty, born in Pondicherry, India on 14 April 1927, settled in Anse aux Pins on Mahé Island. He completed his schooling at St. Louis College and later enrolled in a medical college in Madras at 15. Illness forced him to abandon his studies, after which he returned to Seychelles and married a Seychellois woman.

== Career ==
He began his career in the copra export business before entering politics as a member of the Seychelles Democratic Party. Following Seychelles’ independence from Britain, Chetty was appointed minister of agriculture and later served as minister of finance under President James Mancham.
