= Platte Island Airport =

Airport in Seychelles

- IATA: none; ICAO: FSPL

Summary
- Airport type: Private
- Operator: Islands Development Corporation (IDC)
- Serves: Platte Island, Seychelles
- Elevation AMSL: 9 ft / 3 m
- Coordinates: 05°51′50″S 55°23′05″E

Map
- Location of the airport in Seychelles

Runways
Direction	Length		Surface
Direction	m	ft	Surface
17/35	900	2,953	Paved
- Sources: GCM Google Maps

Platte Island Airport (ICAO: FSPL) is an airstrip serving Platte Island in the Seychelles.

== See also ==
- Transport in Seychelles
- List of airports in Seychelles
