= Caroline Abel =

Seychellois economist

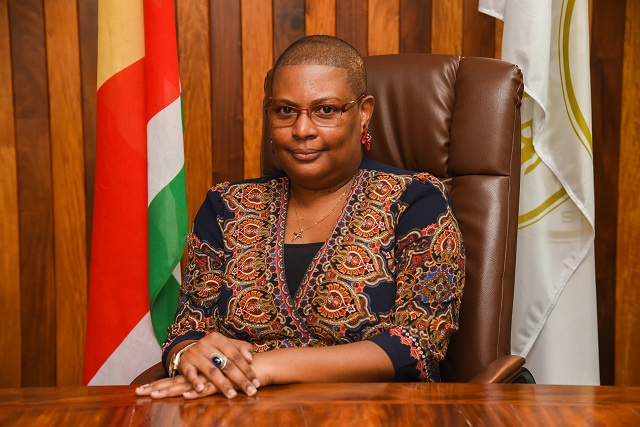
- Caroline Abel in 2020

Governor of the Central Bank of Seychelles
- Incumbent
- Assumed office 14 March 2012
- President: James Michel
- Preceded by: Pierre Laporte

Personal details
- Born: Caroline Abel; 1972 (age 53–54) Anse Boileau, Mahé, Seychelles
- Education: University of Leeds; University of Glasgow
- Profession: Economist

Caroline Abel (born c. 1972) is a Seychellois economist. In 2012, she was appointed Governor of the Central Bank of Seychelles, becoming the first woman in Seychelles to hold the position.

== Early life and education ==
Abel was born in Anse Boileau, Mahé, Seychelles, where she completed her basic and secondary education. She is a daughter of Antoine Abel, Seychelles' first playwright. She holds an undergraduate degree in Economics from the University of Leeds and a Master's degree in monetary economics from the University of Glasgow respectively.

== Career ==
Her career began in April 1994 when she was employed as a senior bank clerk at the Central Bank of Seychelles. She served in several capabilities in the Central Bank of Seychelles before being appointed Deputy Governor of the bank in July 2010. On 14 March 2012, Abel became the first woman to be appointed Governor of the Central Bank of Seychelles, succeeding Pierre Laporte.

== Publications ==
- Central Bank Independence in a Small Open Economy: The Case of Seychelles (2009)

== Recognitions ==
During the 6th African Business Leadership Forum and Awards, Abel was awarded a special Commendation Award by Georgia Legislative Black Caucus. She was also presented with the African Female Public Servant of the Year Award by the African Leadership Magazine at the event.
