= List of airports in Seychelles =

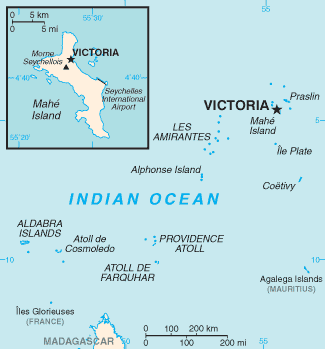
Map of Seychelles

This is a list of airports in Seychelles, sorted by location.

Seychelles, officially the Republic of Seychelles, is an archipelago nation of 115 islands in the Indian Ocean, some 1,500 kilometres (932 mi) east of mainland Africa, northeast of the island of Madagascar. Other nearby island countries and territories include Zanzibar to the west, Mauritius and Réunion to the south, Comoros and Mayotte to the southwest. The Seychelles has the smallest population of any African state.

== Airports ==
Island	ICAO	IATA	Airport name
Alphonse Island	FSAL		Alphonse Airport
Assumption Island	FSAS		Assumption Island Airport
Astove Island	FSSA		Astove Island Airport
Bird Island	FSSB	BDI	Bird Island Airport
Coëtivy Island	FSSC		Coëtivy Airport
D'Arros Island	FSDA		D'Arros Island Airport
Denis Island	FSSD	DEI	Denis Island Airport
Desroches Island	FSDR	DES	Desroches Airport
Farquhar Islands	FSFA		Farquhar Airport
Frégate Island	FSSF	FRK	Frégate Island Airport
Mahé Island	FSIA	SEZ	Seychelles International Airport
Marie Louise Island	FSMA		Marie Louise Island Airport
Platte Island	FSPL		Platte Island Airport
Praslin Island	FSPP	PRI	Praslin Island Airport
Remire Island (Eagle Island)	FSSR		Remire Island Airport

== See also ==
- Transport in Seychelles
- List of airports by ICAO code: F#FS - Seychelles
- Wikipedia: WikiProject Aviation/Airline destination lists: Africa#Seychelles
