= Ligne Aérienne Seychelles =

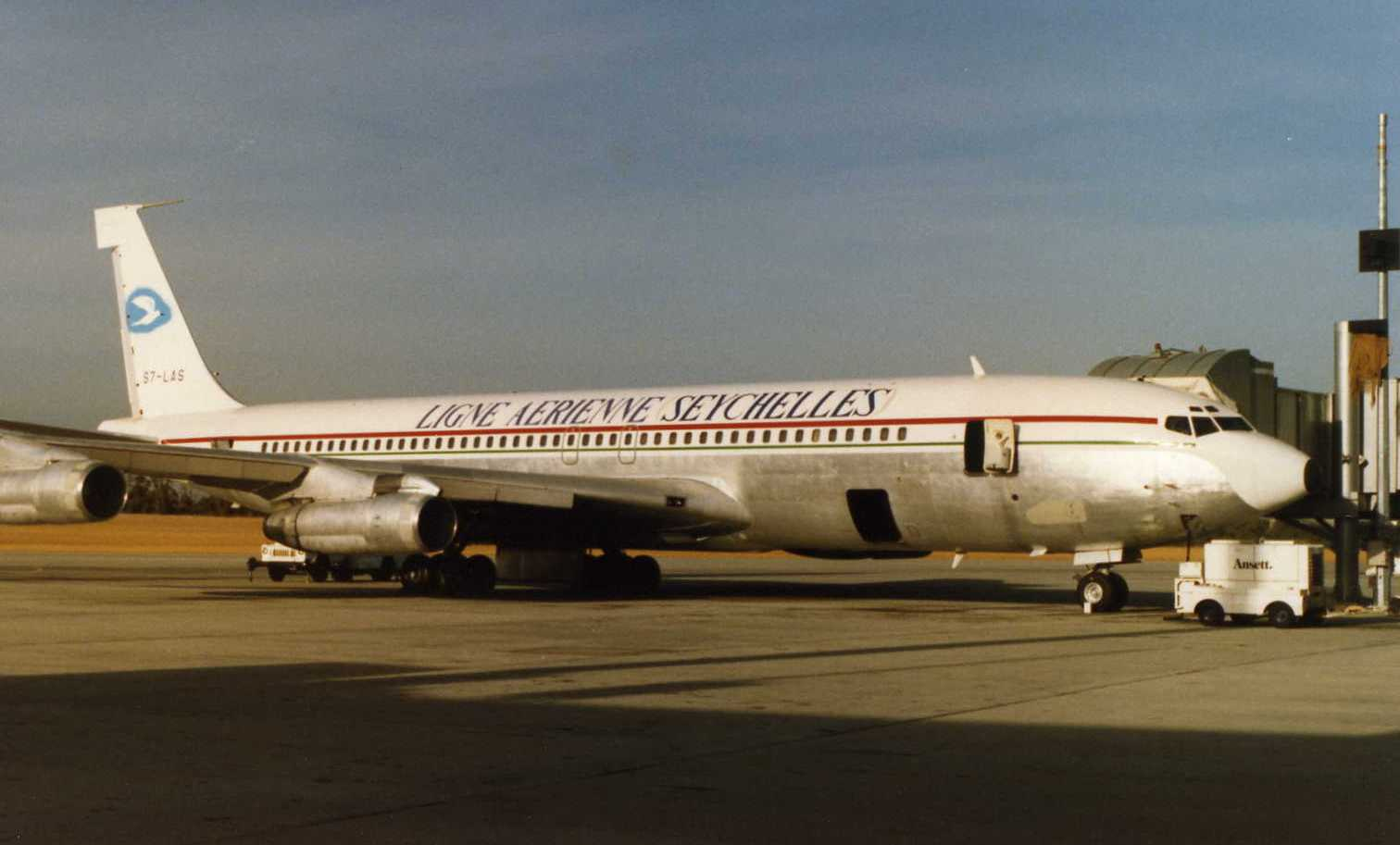
- Ligne Aérienne Seychelles Boeing 707
IATA	ICAO	Call sign
(none)	YP	-
- Founded: 1986
- Commenced operations: December 1986
- Ceased operations: 1987
- Operating bases: Mahé Airport
- Fleet size: 1 Boeing 707
- Destinations: Gaborone, Lilongwe, Perth, Singapore
- Headquarters: Mahé, Seychelles
- Key people: Christopher Hurndall, Paul Lewis

Ligne Aérienne Seychelles (LAS) was a charter airline based on Mahé in Seychelles. The airline was formed in 1986 by Christopher Hurndall, in collaboration with Paul Lewis, and began operating charter flights in December 1986 with a leased Boeing 707 (S7-LAS). The airline's destinations included Gaborone, Botswana; Lilongwe, Malawi; Perth, Australia and Singapore.

== Fleet ==
Ligne Aérienne Seychelles operated 1 Boeing 707 aircraft
