= Farquhar Atoll =

Atoll in the Seychelles

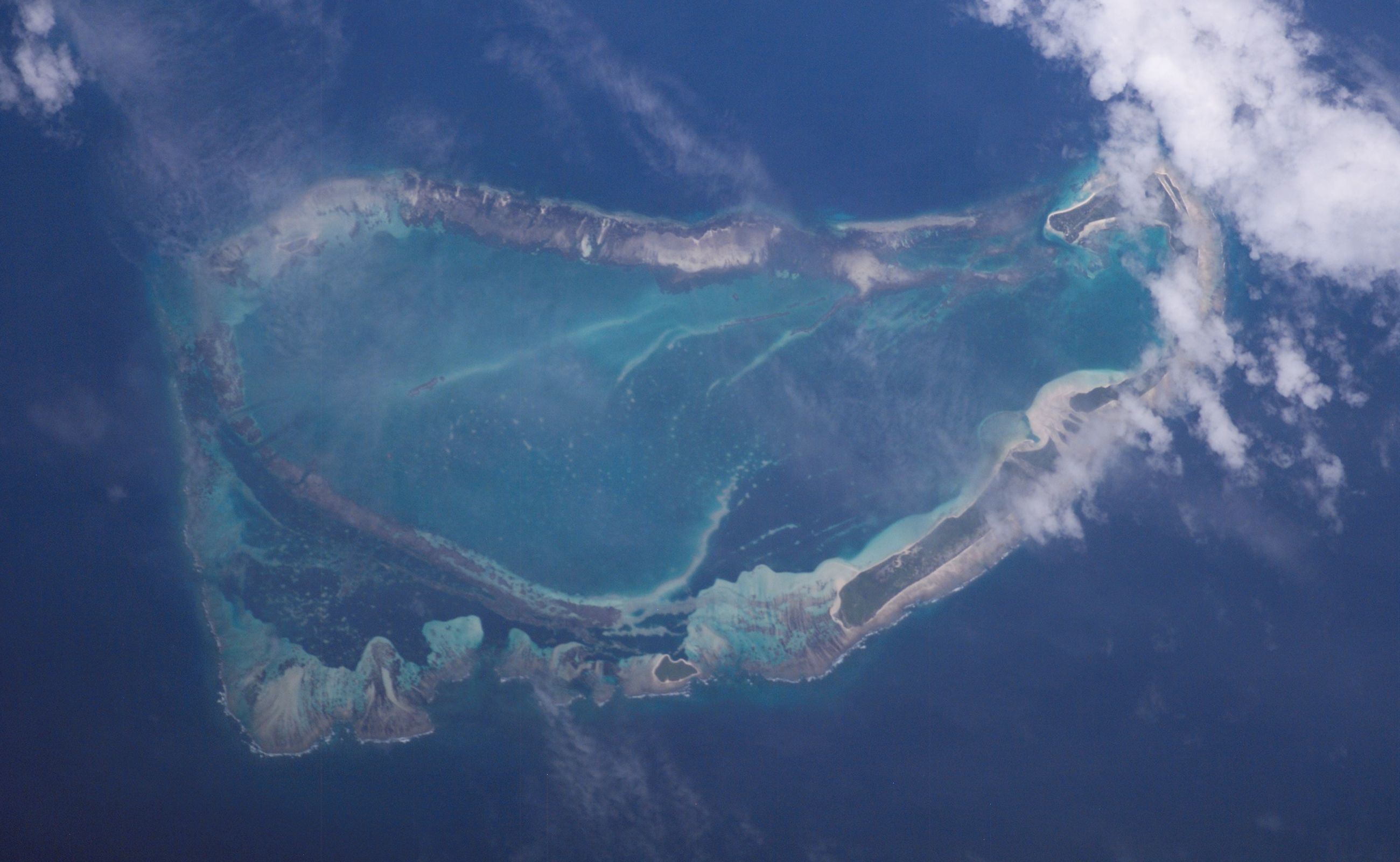
- NASA photo of Farquhar Atoll

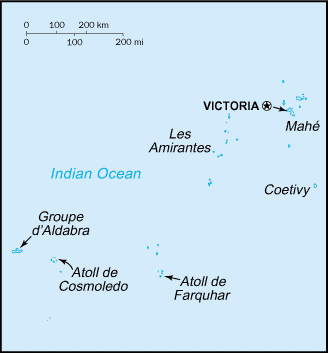
- Map of Seychelles showing the location of Farquhar Atoll

- Location of Farquhar Atoll in Seychelles

Geography
- Location: Indian Ocean
- Coordinates: 10°10′S 51°08′E
- Archipelago: Seychelles
- Adjacent to: Madagascar (north of)
- Total islands: 11
- Major islands: North Island; South Island
- Area: 8.357 km^{2} (3.227 sq mi)
- Highest elevation: 23 m (75 ft)

Administration
- Seychelles
- Group: Outer Islands
- Sub-Group: Farquhar Group
- Districts: Outer Islands District
- Largest settlement: Grande Poste (pop. 20)

Demographics
- Population: 20 (2014)
- Pop. density: 2.4/km^{2} (6.2/sq mi)
- Ethnic groups: Creole, French, East Africans, Indians.

Additional information
- Time zone: SCT (UTC+4)
- ISO code: SC-26
- Official website: www.seychelles.travel/en/discover/the-islands/outer-islands

The Farquhar Atoll is part of the Farquhar Group of islands in the Seychelles, part of the Outer Islands chain. It is located 770 kilometres (478 miles) southwest of Mahé Island and the capital, Victoria, 258 km (160 mi) north of Madagascar, and around 1,000 km (621 mi) from the East African mainland.

== History ==
The atoll was named in honor of Robert Townsend Farquhar in 1824. Fishing camps were established on North Island in 1850. From the early to mid-sixteenth century, the atoll had been vaguely named after Portuguese explorer João da Nova, who first encountered Farquhar and the Outer Islands while commandeering his country's expedition to India in 1504. Administration of the islands were a grey area for a time, with both Mauritius and Seychelles claiming ownership. In 1881, officials in Seychelles suggested that Farquhar Atoll (along with several other outer islands) be administered from their capital, Victoria, rather than from Mauritius. There were objections, as the owners at that time were based in Mauritius; after considerable political debate, the Mauritian owners lost their case, with administration being subsequently passed from Mauritius to Seychelles.

By 1960, the village on the northern tip of South Island was abandoned. From 1965 until Seychelles independence (in 1976), Farquhar was a part of the British Indian Ocean Territory. In 2004, there were basic infrastructure renovations on the atoll. In 2014, the Island Conservation Society opened a conservation centre on North Island.

On 16 April 2016, Farquhar Atoll was hit by Cyclone Fantala, the strongest tropical cyclone ever recorded in the southwestern Indian Ocean. The storm surge destroyed most of the buildings on the atoll, except the cyclone shelter. The Islands Development Company (IDC) commenced the rebuilding and rehabilitation of the island's infrastructure, rebuilding the guest house and hotel for groups taking reserved catch and release flyfishing trips.

== Geography ==
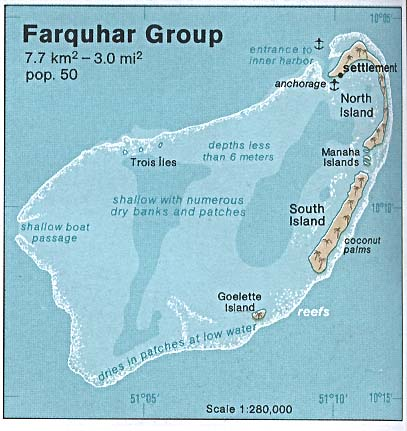
Map of Farquhar Atoll

The atoll is located at 10°10′S 51°08′E. It is the most southerly part of the Seychelles. The total area of the atoll, including the large lagoon, is 170.5 square kilometres (65.8 square miles). The land area is 8.357 square kilometres (3.2 square miles). Farquhar Atoll is notable for its high sand dunes, some of which reach to over 23 metres (75 feet) in height.

=== List of islands ===
The main group of islands form a long curve which describes the eastern side of the atoll. Largest of these are North Farquhar and South Farquhar, with the smaller Manaha islands between them. Farther south is Goëlettes.
To the extreme western side of the atoll lies the island of Sable, and near it a small group known as Trois Islands.

	Island	Sobriquet	type	Location	Area (hectares)	Coastline (km)	Length (km)	Width (km)	elevation (m)
1	North Farquhar	Île du Nord	island	10°07′23″S 51°10′38″E	354.40	17.90	5.0	0.6	12.2
2	South Farquhar	Île du Sud	island	10°11′00″S 51°09′50″E	419.50	14.10	5.40	0.80	23
3	North Manaha	Île du Manaha Nord	island	10°09′17″S 51°10′35″E	3.00	0.85	0.10	0.35	0.5
4	Middle Manaha	Île du Manaha Milieu	island	10°09′23″S 51°10′33″E	7.90	1.15	0.21	0.45	0.5
5	South Manaha	Île du Manaha Sud	island	10°09′32″S 51°10′33″E	4.20	1.05	0.43	0.12	0.5
6	Goëlettes		island	10°13′28″S 51°07′45″E	32.00	2.35	0.60	0.80	3
7	Rabbit	Île Lapin	sand cay	10°08′57″S 51°05′20″E	0.80	0.50	0.25	0.05	0.00
8	Sand Trois	Banc de Trois Îles	sand cay	10°09′00″S 51°05′06″E	0.30	0.30	0.05	0.02	0.00
9	Middle Trois	Île de Milieu de Trois Îles	sand cay	10°09′00″S 51°04′41″E	0.70	0.33	0.11	0.08	0.00
10	Dépose		sand cay	10°09′04″S 51°04′17″E	1.14	0.43	0.12	0.12	0.00
11	Sable	Grande Caye	island	10°10′20″S 51°02′28″E	11.70	1.50	0.66	0.21	0.00
	Farquhar Atoll		Atoll	10°07′S 51°10′E	835.70				23

== Demographics ==
There is a small settlement on North Island.

== Administration ==
The island belongs to Outer Islands District. Being an island with a small population, there are not any government buildings or services. For many services, people have to go to Victoria, which is a difficult task.

== Transport ==
North Farquhar is bisected by a 1,170 metres (3,840 ft) paved airfield (ICAO: FSFA) that is located near North East Point. The island is occasionally serviced by an Island Development Company (IDC) aircraft from Mahé. There is a jetty in the settlement

== Economics ==
The inhabitants on the island are engaged in very small scale farming, livestock, salted fish production and coconut processing which include production of copra, pounac and coconut oil. In addition, there is a small guesthouse that caters mainly for fly-fishing clients during October to April.

== Flora and fauna ==
The islands of Farquhar (excluding the North and South Islands and the Manahas) have been designated as an Important Bird Area. Goëlettes is considered the most interesting for bird-watching and conservation, with a huge seasonal colony of over 300,000 pairs of sooty tern (Sterna fuscata) and around 10,000 pairs of brown noddy (Anous stolidus). In 2006, the Island Conservation Society recorded 15 nesting pairs of the previously-undocumented black-naped tern (Sterna sumatrana) at Sable Island, the largest population on any one island in the region, the species primarily being known from Goëlettes.

Farquhar is an important habitat for the nearly-extirpated Seychelles giant tortoise (Aldabrachelys gigantea), also referred to as the Aldabra tortoise, as their primary habitat and largest population is on Aldabra. With an estimated Seychelles population of at least 100,000 tortoises, they are the second-largest tortoise species on earth, after the Galápagos tortoise. From the ocean, Farquhar is a key nesting location for sea turtles. Surveys conducted in the early 1980s—when sea turtles were still intensively hunted—estimated 425 nesting green sea turtle females and 27 hawksbill turtles per annum. A later survey, conducted in 2007, suggested an increase in the number of nesting females, thanks to the protected status given to sea turtles in Seychelles in 1994. Other fauna of interest includes several species of day gecko (genus Phelsuma), such as the gold dust day gecko (Phelsuma laticauda), as well as the coconut crab (Birgus latro), a land-dwelling, semi-arboreal species of hermit crab, the largest terrestrial arthropod known.

== Tourism ==
There is a small lodge on the island for guests of fishing excursions, offering catch-and-release fly fishing trips through Alphonse Fishing Company.

== Image gallery ==
Map of Seychelles

District map of the Outer Islands
