= Pierre Frank Laporte =

Seychellois government minister

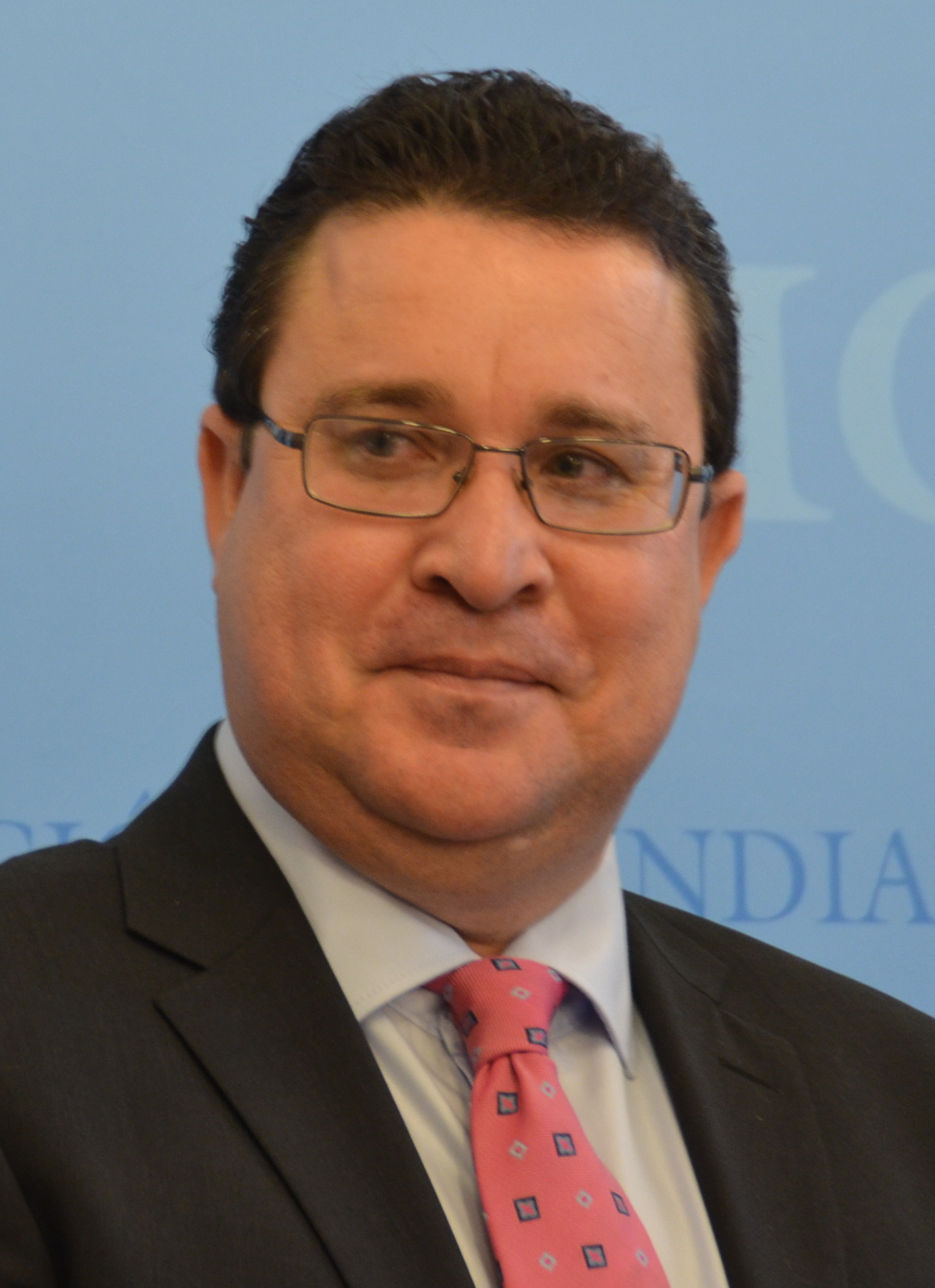

Minister of Finance, Economic Planning and Trade
- Incumbent
- Assumed office 6 November 2025
- President: Patrick Herminie
- Preceded by: Naadir Hassan
- In office 2012–2015
- President: James Michel
- Preceded by: Danny Faure
- Succeeded by: Jean-Paul Adam

Governor of Central Bank of Seychelles
- In office November 2008 – March 2012
- Preceded by: Francis Chang Leng
- Succeeded by: Caroline Abel

Pierre Frank Laporte is a Seychellois economist, who was the Governor of the Central Bank of Seychelles from 2008 to 2012, and Minister for Finance, Trade and Investment from 2012 to 2015, and again Minister of Finance since 2025.

Laporte holds a master's degree in social economics from Sheffield University, as well as a bachelor's degree in business economics and computing from Surrey University.

Laporte started working for the Central Bank of Seychelles in 1999, in various positions. In 2002 he went to work in the IMF, and was the IMF's local representative in Niger from 2005. As an IMF representative, he worked extensively with diplomacy towards both the government, donors and the private sector, to implement economic reforms. From November 2008 to March 2012, he was Governor of the Central Bank of Seychelles. He took over from Francis Chang Leng. When he was appointed Minister of Finance in 2012, Caroline Abel took over as governor of the central bank.

In October 2015, after working as the Minister of Finance, Laporte started working in the World Bank as a director.
