= Seychelles International Safari Air =

Airline of the Seychelles

Seychelles International Safari Air Limited
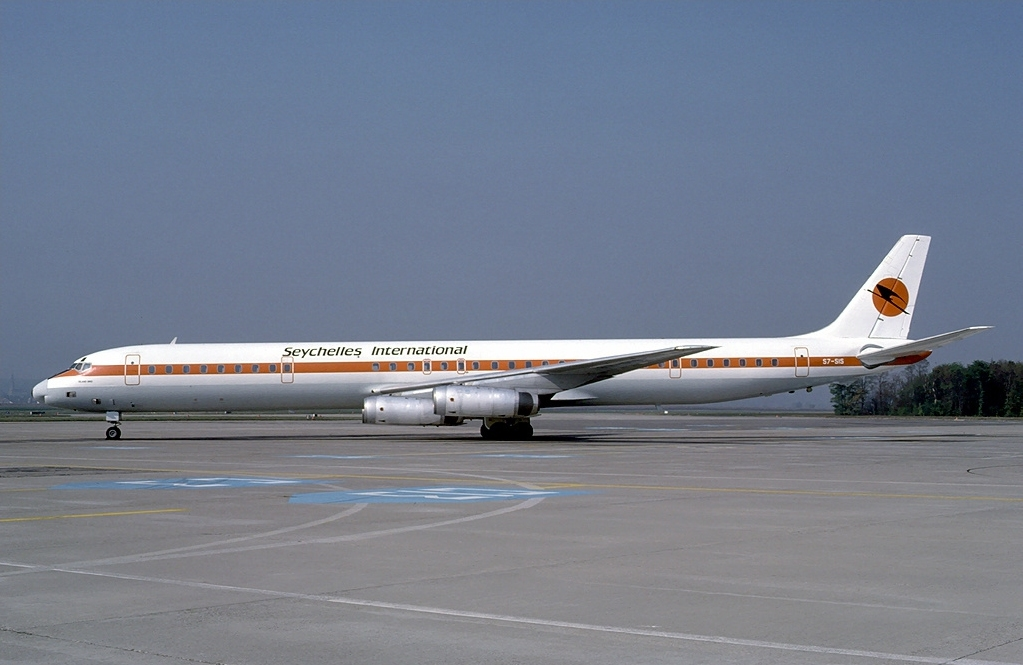
- Douglas DC-8 of SIA at Basel
| IATA | ICAO | Call sign |
|---|---|---|
| (none) | CK (SIS) | SISAL |
- Founded: 1982
- Commenced operations: 1982
- Ceased operations: 1986
- Fleet size: 1 Douglas DC-8
- Headquarters: Mahé, Seychelles

Seychelles International Safari Air Limited (SISA), operating as Seychelles International Airways (SIA) was a charter airline based on Mahé in Seychelles.

The airline commenced operations on non-scheduled routes from the Seychelles to Basel (Switzerland) and Cologne/Bonn (Germany) on behalf of tour operator African Safari Club with one Douglas DC-8-53 (S7-SIA) on 2 November 1982. This aircraft was replaced by a DC-8-63 (S7-SIS) in December 1983. SISA ceased operations in July 1986.
