= Central Bank of Seychelles =

Central Bank of Seychelles Banque centrale des Seychelles Labank santral Sesel
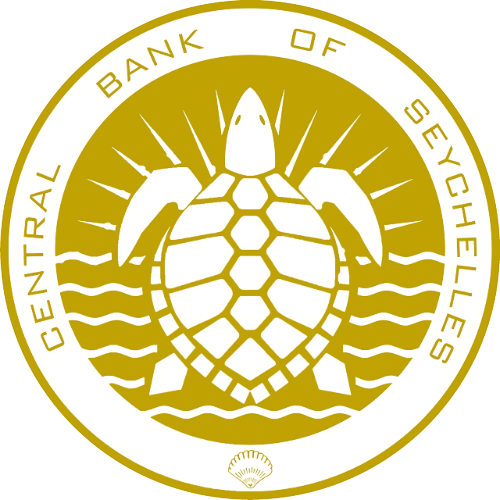

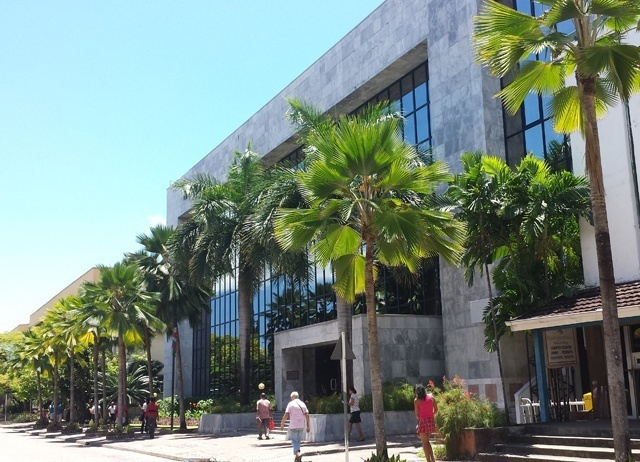
- Central bank of: Seychelles
- Headquarters: Victoria, Seychelles
- Coordinates: 04°37′24″S 55°27′14″E
- Established: 1 January 1983; 43 years ago
- Ownership: 100% state ownership
- Governor: Caroline Abel
- Currency: Seychellois rupee SCR (ISO 4217)
- Reserves: 530 million USD
- Website: www.cbs.sc

The Central Bank of Seychelles (French: Banque centrale des Seychelles, Seychellois Creole: Labank santral Sesel), is the central bank of Seychelles. It was officially established on 1 January 1983, with the dissolution of its precursor, the Seychelles Monetary Authority.

== Location ==
The offices of the bank are housed in the Central Bank Building on Independence Avenue in Victoria, the capital city of Seychelles. The three-storey building is fully air-conditioned and has 3,500 square metres (38,000 sq ft) of office and storage space.

== History ==
In 1974, the Currency Commission of the Seychelles was formed. In 1978, the Seychelles Monetary Authority was established, which in 1983 was transformed into the Central Bank of Seychelles (CBS). Up until 1982, the accounts of the Government of Seychelles were managed by Barclays Bank International. On 29 December 1982 that responsibility was transferred to CBS by passing the "Central Bank of Seychelles Act 1982". An amended "Central Bank of Seychelles Act 2004" provided for the autonomy of the bank within the Seychellois government structure.

== Governance ==
The affairs of the bank are supervised by an eight-person board of directors, chaired by the bank governor. As of April 2020, the following eight individuals comprised the board.

1. Caroline Abel: Governor and Chairperson
2. Christopher Edmond: First Deputy Governor
3. Jenifer Sullivan: Second Deputy Governor
4. Errol Dias: Director
5. Bertrand Rassool: Director
6. William Otiende Ogara: Director
7. Frank Ally: Attorney General, Director
8. Sherley Marie: Director.

== Governors ==
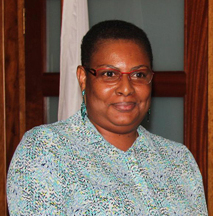
Caroline Abel

The table below illustrates the names of the various Governors of the Central Bank of Seychelles, from its inception, on 1 January 1983.

Governors of the Central Bank of Seychelles Since Inception
| Rank | Governor | From | Until | Notes |
|---|---|---|---|---|
| 1 | Guy Morel | January 1983 | September 1991 | |
| 2 | Aboo Aumeeruddy | September 1991 | April 1995 | |
| 3 | Norman Weber | May 1995 | April 2001 | |
| 4 | Francis Chang-Leng | May 2001 | October 2008 | |
| 5 | Pierre Frank Laporte | November 2008 | March 2012 | |
| 6 | Caroline Abel | March 2012 | present | |

== See also ==
- Economy of the Seychelles
- List of banks in Seychelles
- List of central banks of Africa
- List of central banks
- List of financial supervisory authorities by country
