= Air Seychelles =

Seychelles airline

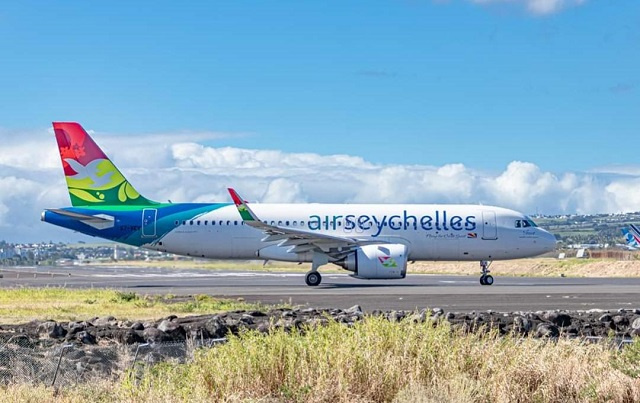
- Air Seychelles Airbus A320neo
IATA	ICAO	Call sign
HM	SEY	SEYCHELLES
- Founded: 15 September 1977; 49 years ago
- Hubs: Seychelles International Airport
- Alliance: Vanilla Alliance
- Fleet size: 7
- Destinations: 12
- Parent company: Government of Seychelles
- Headquarters: Mahé, Seychelles
- Key people: Remco Althuis (CEO)
- Revenue: ▲US$ 106.9 million (2014)
- Profit: ▲US$ 8.4 million (2022)
- Employees: 650 (2014)
- Website: www.airseychelles.com

Air Seychelles is the national airline of the Republic of Seychelles. Its head office is located at Seychelles International Airport on the island of Mahé and it operates inter-island and international flights and charter flights.

== History ==
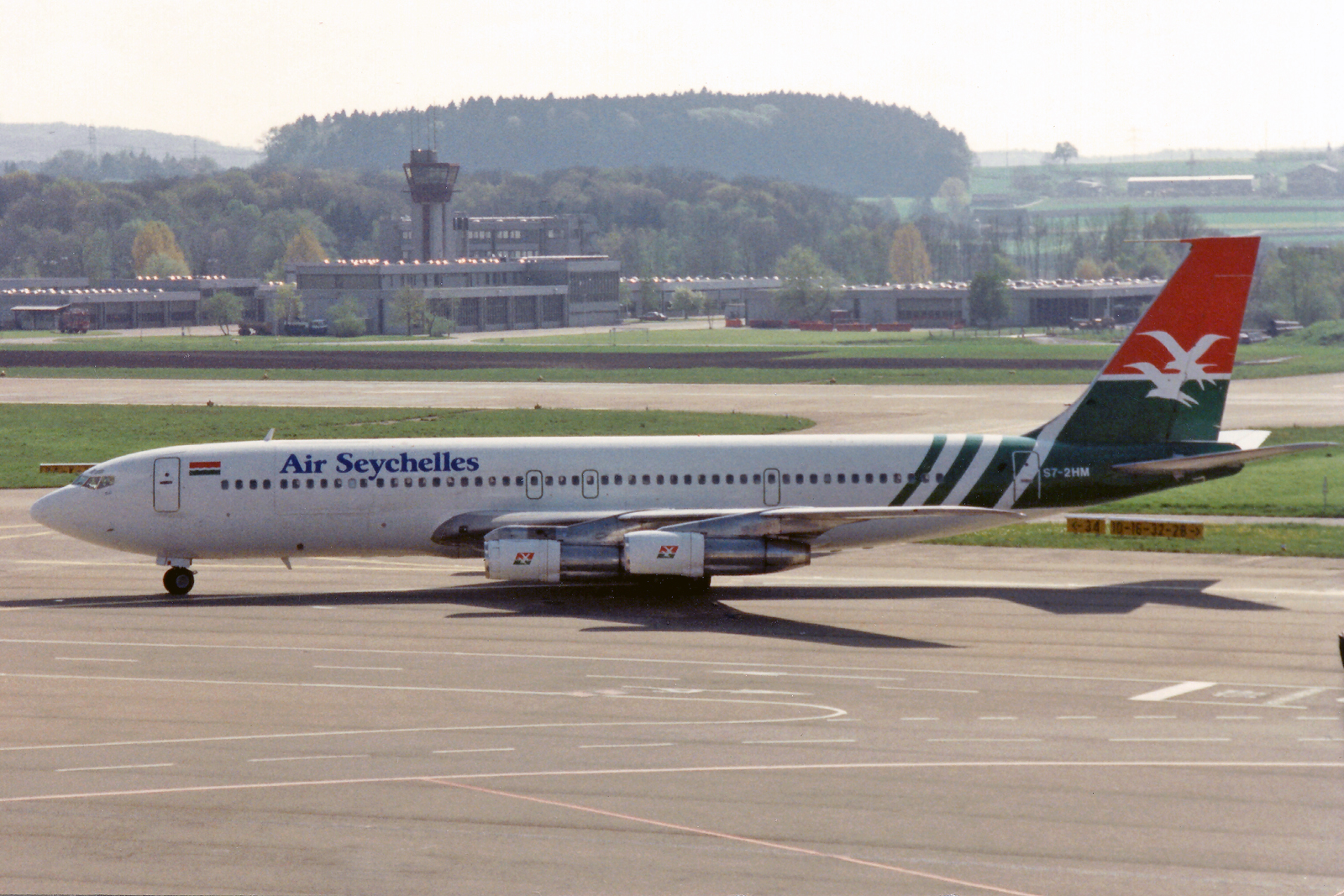
Air Seychelles Boeing 707

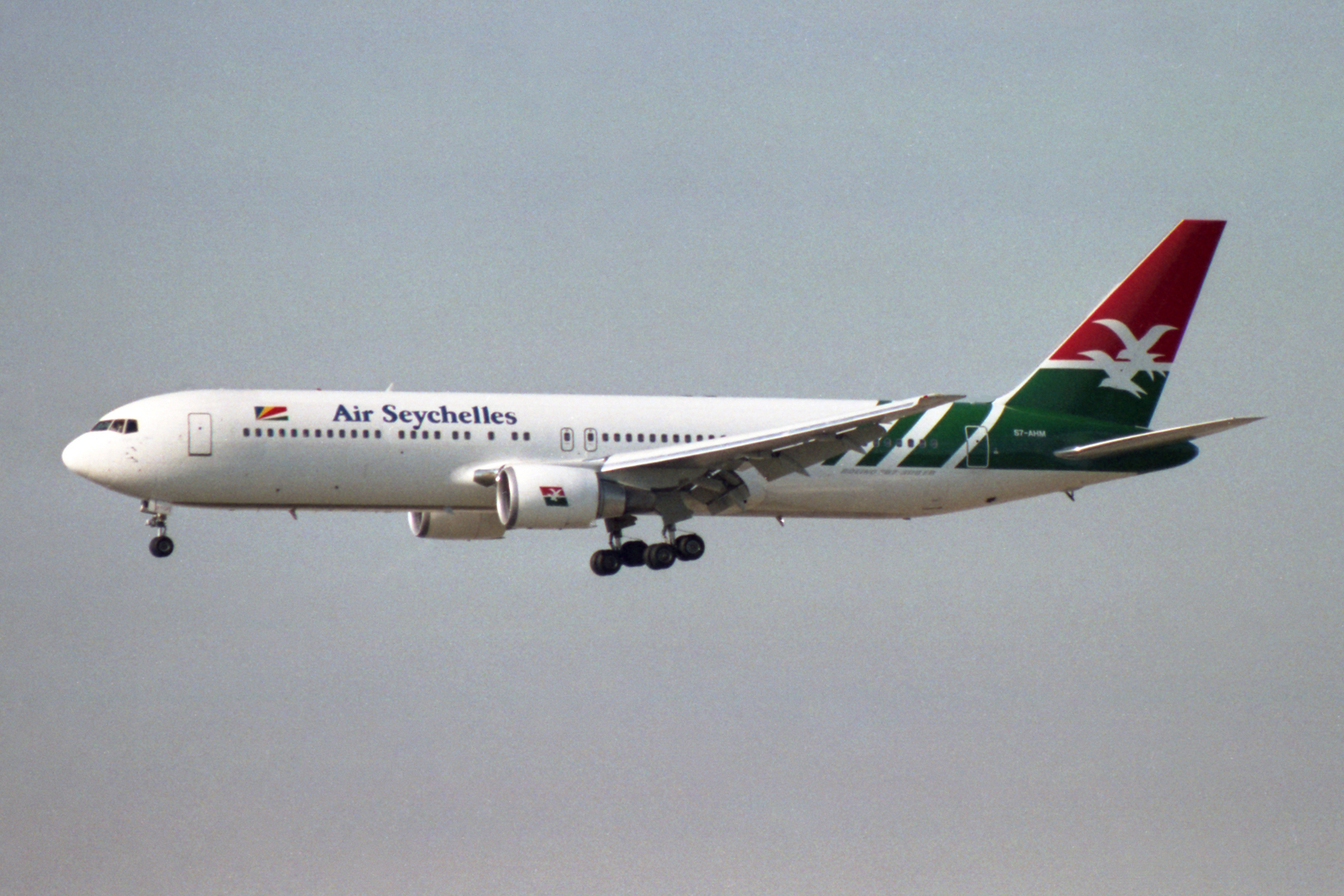
Air Seychelles Boeing 767-300ER in the airline's older livery.

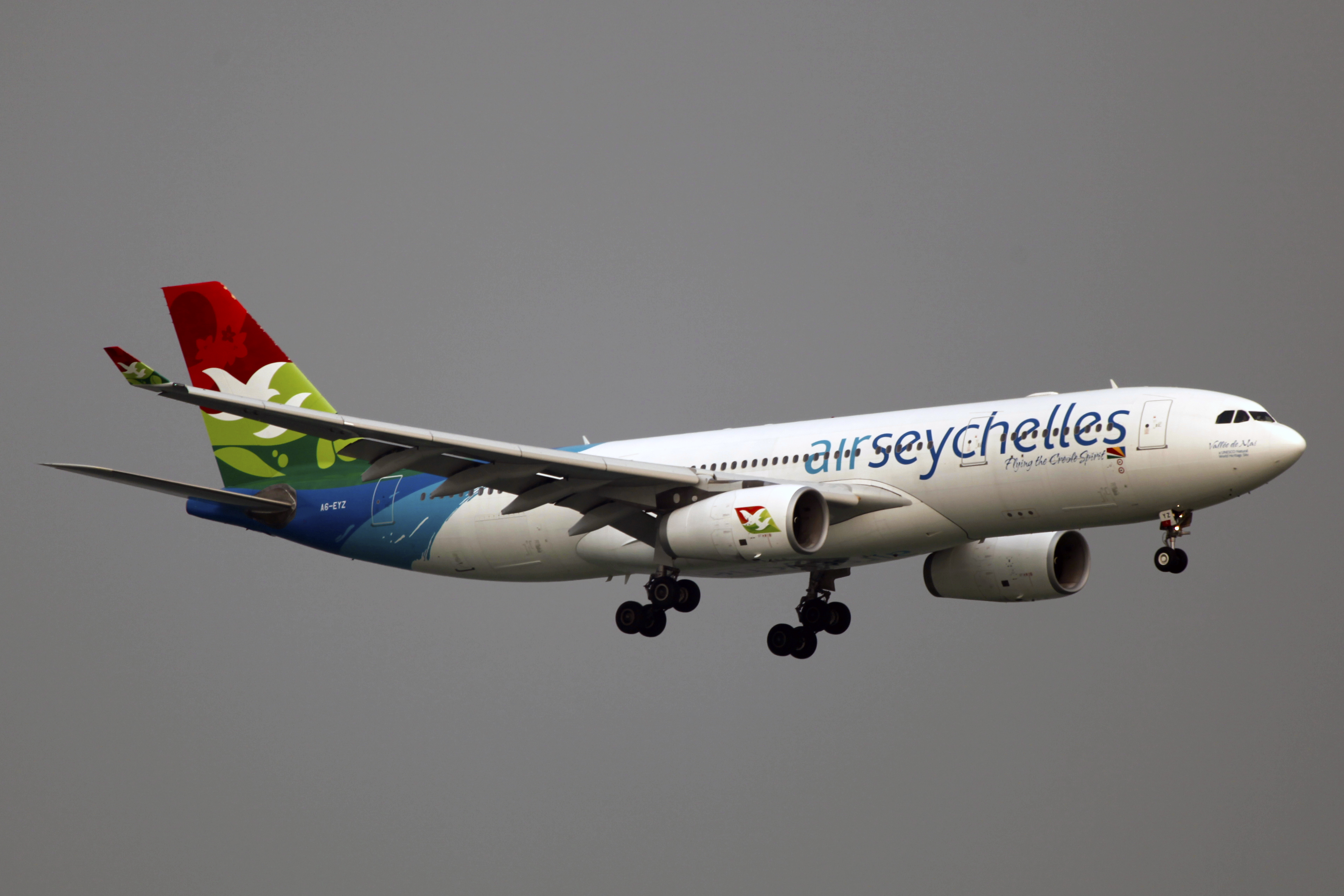
Air Seychelles Airbus A330-200

=== Establishment ===
Seychelles Airlines was formed as the national airline of Seychelles on 15 September 1977 by merging two local carriers: Air Mahé and Inter-Island Airways. It was named Air Seychelles in September 1978. The airline began international routes in 1983 to Frankfurt and London.

=== Investment ===
In February 2012, Etihad Airways, invested US$45 million in Air Seychelles for a 40% share in the airline following problems of management and profitability. After operating at a loss for two years in a row, Air Seychelles planned to restructure and re-position itself to return to profit. The airline entered into codeshare agreements with Etihad Airways and started flying to Abu Dhabi in March 2012 to connect to Etihad Airways' network of destinations.

On 16 March 2012, Air Seychelles announced a two-year business plan including the renewal of its fleet, leveraging Etihad Airways equity partnership – known as Etihad Airways Partners (which also included Alitalia, Air Serbia and Virgin Australia), the introduction of Airbus A330−200 aircraft after over two decades of an all-Boeing fleet, increased frequencies to key destinations, and closer cooperation with Etihad Airways.

On 12 March 2015, Air Seychelles released their results for 2014, declaring US$3.2 million in net profits.

=== Restructuring ===
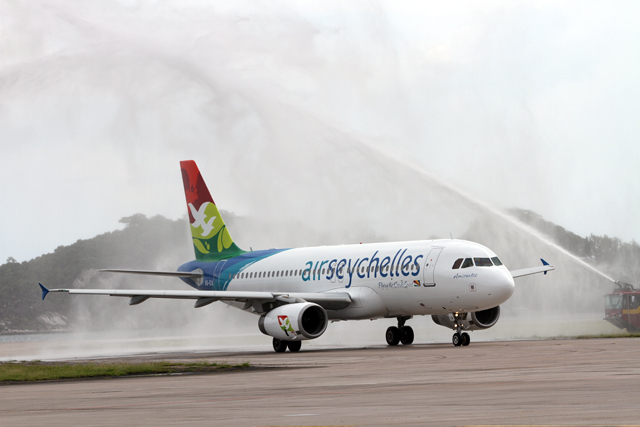
Air Seychelles Airbus A320-200

In January 2018, Air Seychelles announced the closure of its sole long-haul route to Paris, the return of its two Airbus A330 long-haul aircraft, and a focus on its regional network. The plan is aimed at ensuring the long-term profitability and sustainability for the airline, in response to rapidly increasing competition. Remco Althuis, Interim CEO, said, 'The launch of competing air services from Europe to Seychelles will significantly impact Air Seychelles' flights to and from Paris, which account for approximately 30% of total passenger revenue at the airline, making the route unsustainable.' The airline will refocus on its domestic and regional networks, with a reduced workforce.

== Corporate affairs ==
=== Ownership ===
Air Seychelles was established and originally owned by the Government of Seychelles, having purchased and merged several small aircraft operators into one airline. Following problems of management and profitability, Etihad Airways acquired a 40 per cent stake in Air Seychelles in 2012, in a deal worth $45m. On 1 May 2021 it was announced Etihad Airways sold its 40% stake back to the Government of Seychelles.

=== Business trends ===
The key trends for Air Seychelles over recent years are shown below (as at year ending 31 December):

	2012	2013	2014	2015	2016	2017	2018
Turnover (US$m)	42.8	88.7	106.9	105.4			
Net Profits (US$m)	1.1	3.0	3.2	2.1			
Number of employees (at year end)	536	629	650	727	787		725
Number of passengers (000s)	241	352	412	523	550		455
Passenger load factor (%)		50	60	66			
Number of aircraft (at year end)			10			10	7
Notes/sources							

=== Services ===
Air Seychelles VIP is a specialised facility offering services for VIP passengers, aircraft crew and aeronautical technical support, including fixed-base operation which is managed in conjunction with Royal Jet.

The Air Seychelles Plus Programme has been fully integrated into Etihad Guest, the loyalty programme of Etihad Airways, since June 2012.

== Destinations ==
As of April 2023, Air Seychelles serves the following destinations:

Country	City/Locality	Airport	Notes	Ref
India	Mumbai	Chhatrapati Shivaji Maharaj International Airport		
Israel	Tel Aviv	David Ben Gurion International Airport		
Kazakhstan	Almaty	Almaty International Airport		
Madagascar	Antananarivo	Ivato International Airport	Terminated	
Mauritius	Port Louis	Sir Seewoosagur Ramgoolam International Airport		
Seychelles	Bird Island	Bird Island Airport	Charter	
Seychelles	Denis Island	Denis Island Airport	Charter	
Seychelles	D'Arros Island	D'Arros Island Airport	Charter	
Seychelles	Mahé	Seychelles International Airport	Hub	
Seychelles	Praslin	Praslin Island Airport		
South Africa	Johannesburg	O. R. Tambo International Airport		
Singapore	Singapore	Changi Airport	Terminated	
Sri Lanka	Colombo	Bandaranaike International Airport		
United Arab Emirates	Abu Dhabi	Zayed International Airport		

=== Codeshare agreements ===
Air Seychelles has codeshare agreements with the following airlines:

- Air Botswana
- Air India
- Emirates
- South African Airways
- SriLankan Airlines
- Turkish Airlines

== Fleet ==
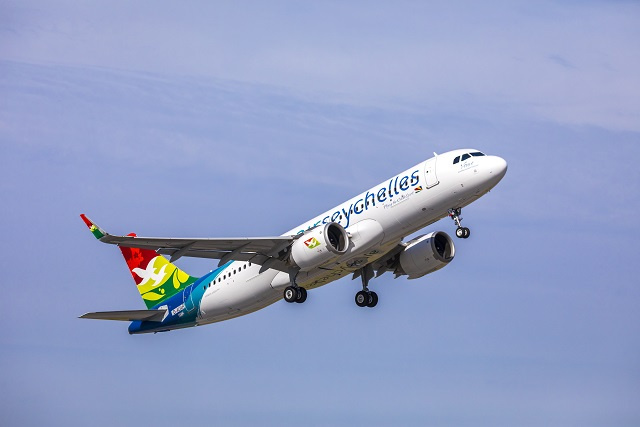
Air Seychelles Airbus A320neo

=== Current fleet ===
As of October 2026, Air Seychelles operates the following aircraft:

Air Seychelles fleet
Aircraft	In Service	Orders	Passengers			Notes
Aircraft	In Service	Orders	J	Y	Total	Notes
Airbus A320neo	2	—	12	156	168	
Airbus A321XLR	—	2	N/A			
Viking Air DHC-6-400 Twin Otter	5	—	–	19	19	
Total	7					

=== Livery ===
In October 2011, after nearly 25 years in their livery using traditional red, white and green local colours with two white terns (Gygis alba, the national bird of Seychelles), Air Seychelles painted its first Boeing 767-300ER aircraft in the company's new colours. The colours used on the tail end are blue, green, red and white.

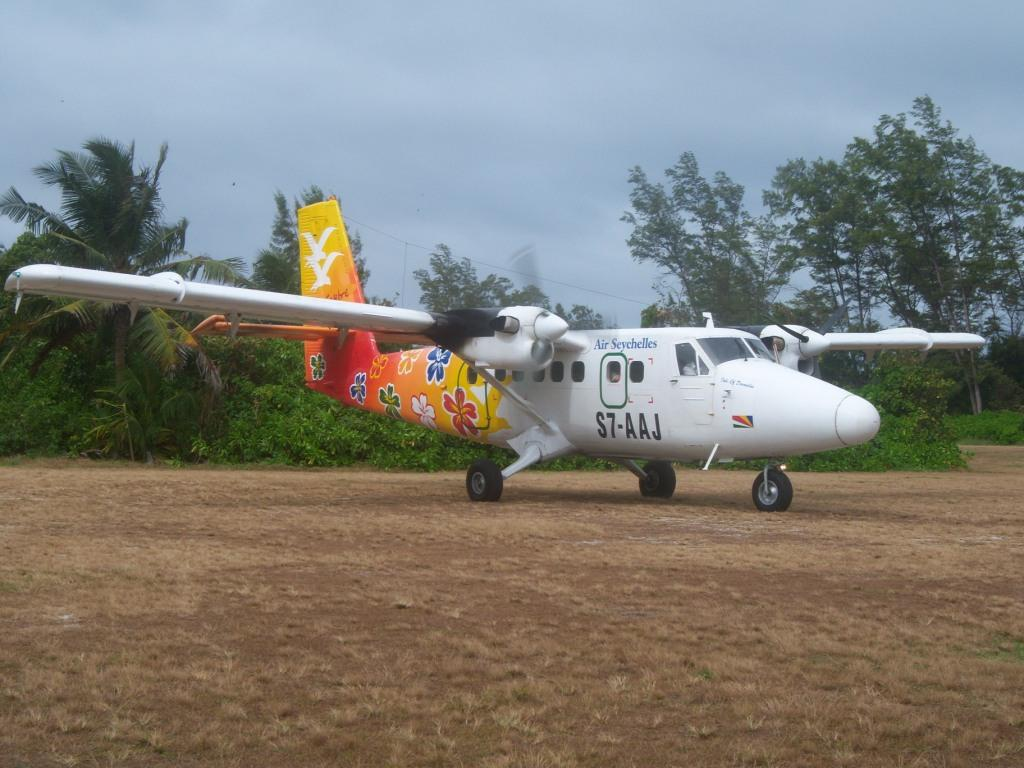
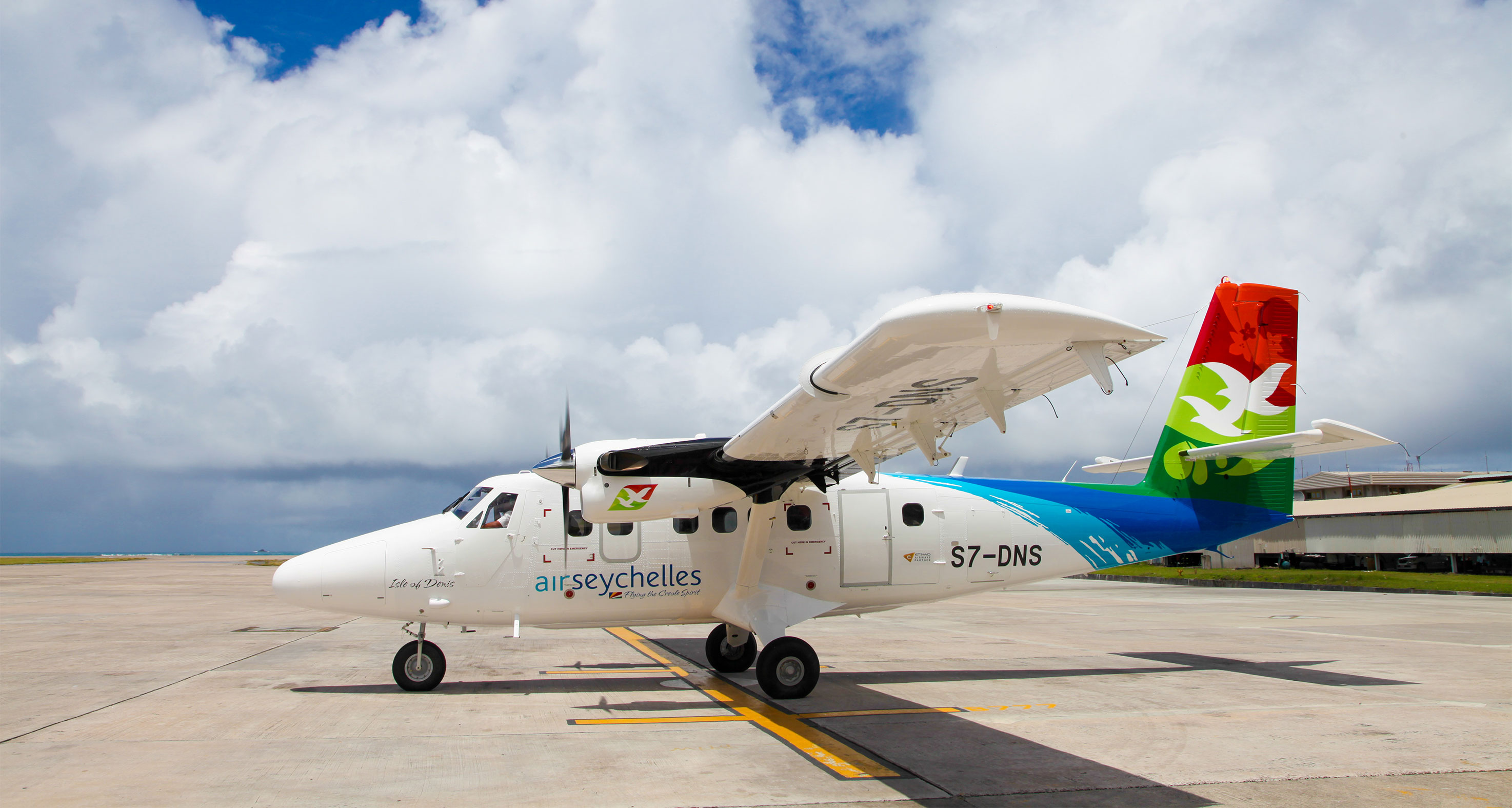
Air Seychelles Viking Air DHC-6-400 Twin Otter in former (left) and current (right) liveries.
