= Transport in Seychelles =

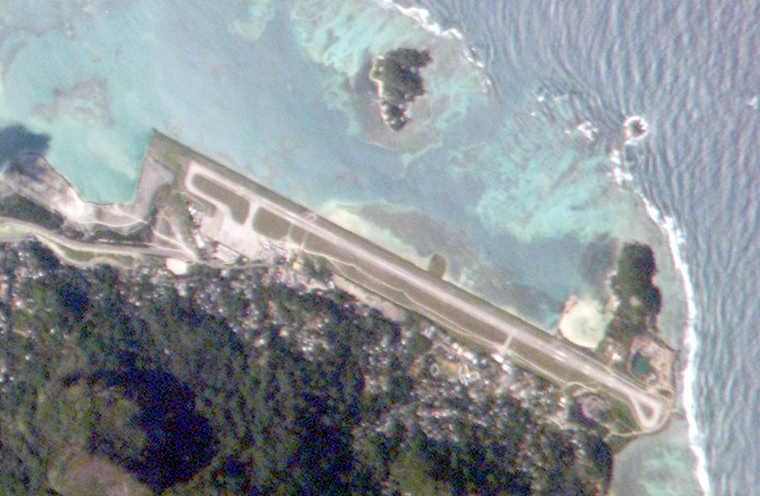
Seychelles International Airport

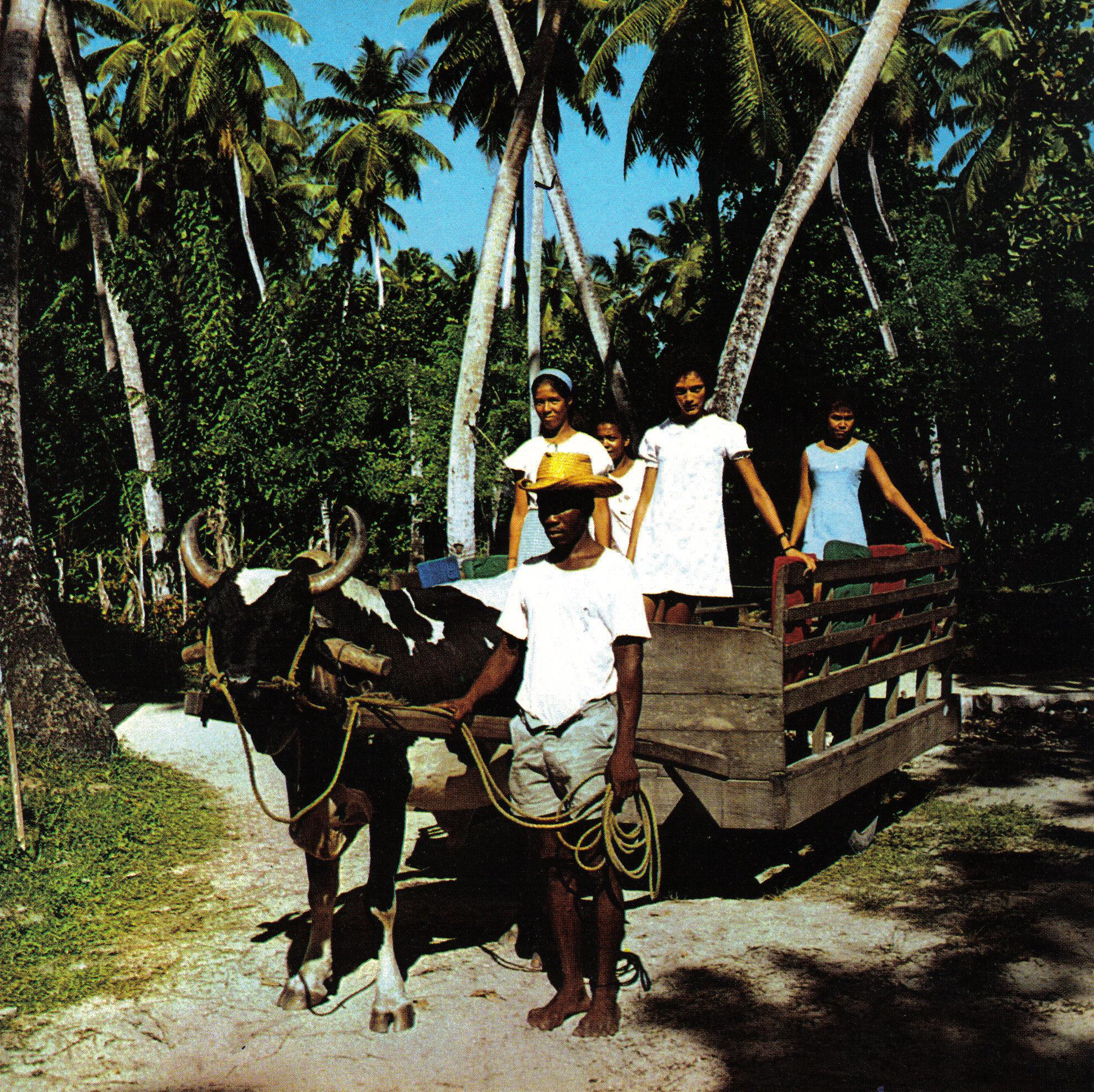
A traditional ox-cart on La Digue

There are a number of modes of transport in Seychelles. Seychelles possesses transportation systems that include 453km of roads (of which 400km are paved), seaports, and airports. The country lacks both railways and a merchant navy. The main seaport is Victoria. Several islands of Seychelles have a bus system.

In rural areas, especially on La Digue, a popular way of public transport is by using ox-carts.

== Roads ==
Several agencies are responsible for roads in Seychelles. This includes the Seychelles Land Transport Agency, responsible for road infrastructure, the Road Transport Commission, responsible for regulating and enforcing traffic laws and the Department of Land Transport, which develops new traffic policies.

Vehicles in Seychelles drive on the left side of the road.

=== Bus network ===
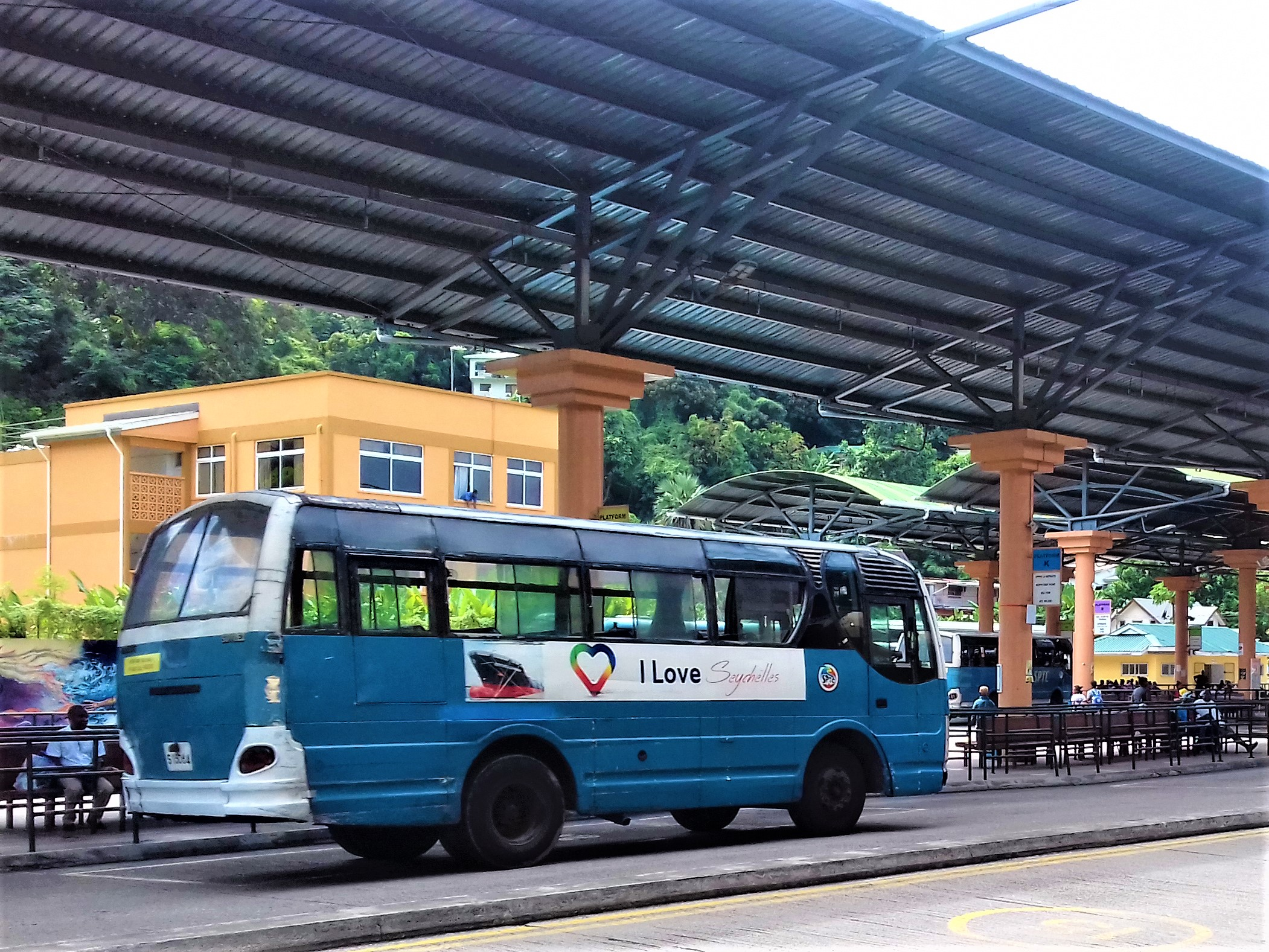
Bus in Seychelles

The Seychelles Public Transport Corporation (SPTC) is responsible for all bus routes in Seychelles. The service has over 106 bus routes on Mahé and Praslin and has 5 bus stations total. There is also three bus depots, and SPTC has a fleet of 250 buses and 240 bus drivers.

== Water transport ==
=== Ports and harbours ===
The biggest port in Seychelles is Port Victoria on Mahé. It is one of the only ports in Seychelles, and the biggest by area. The port can accommodate large ships, such as cruise ships, which arrive occasionally, and has an inner harbour for smaller boats.

== Air transport ==
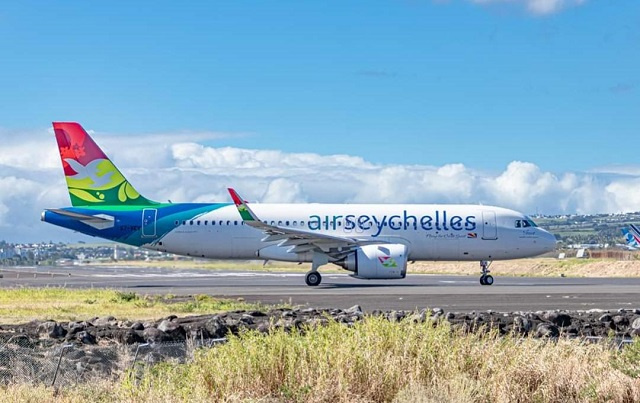
Air Seychelles

There are fourteen airports in Seychelles, the major ones including Seychelles International Airport and Praslin Island Airport. Of the fourteen airports, six have runways that are paved. Aircraft often travel between the various islands of Seychelles. The flag carrier of Seychelles is Air Seychelles, offering international and charter flights.
