= Seychelles International Airport =

Airport in Seychelles

Seychelles International Airport Aéroport de la Pointe Larue
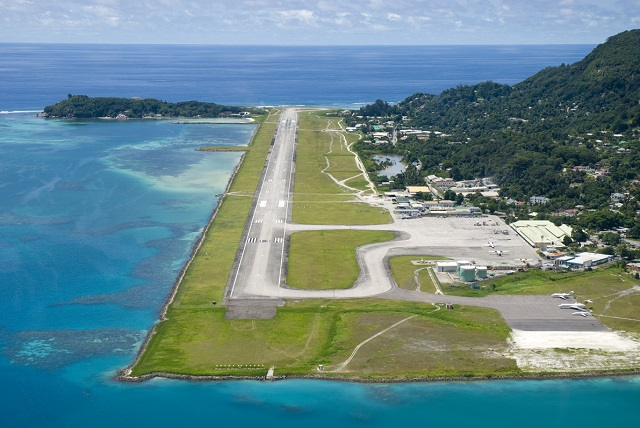
- IATA: SEZ; ICAO: FSIA

Summary
- Airport type: Public / military
- Owner: Government of Seychelles
- Operator: Seychelles Civil Aviation Authority
- Serves: Victoria, Seychelles
- Hub for: Air Seychelles
- Elevation AMSL: 12 ft (3.7 m)
- Coordinates: 4°40′28″S 55°31′19″E
- Website: www.scaa.sc

Map
- Location of airport in Seychelles

Runways
Direction	Length		Surface
Direction	m	ft	Surface
13/31	2,997	9,833	Concrete

Statistics (2013)
- Passengers: 736,558
- Cargo: 8,124 t
- Sources: WAD, Google Maps, National Bureau of Statistics, SkyVector

Seychelles International Airport (French: Aéroport de la Pointe Larue; IATA: SEZ, ICAO: FSIA) is the international airport of the Seychelles located on the island of Mahé near the capital city of Victoria. The airport is the home base and the head office of Air Seychelles and features several regional and long-haul routes due to its importance as the gateway to a major international leisure destination.

The airport is 11 kilometres (6.8 mi) southeast of the capital and is accessible by the Victoria-Providence Highway. It forms part of the administrative districts of La Pointe Larue (terminal area), Cascade/Providence (in the North), and Anse aux Pins (in the south and military base).

== History ==
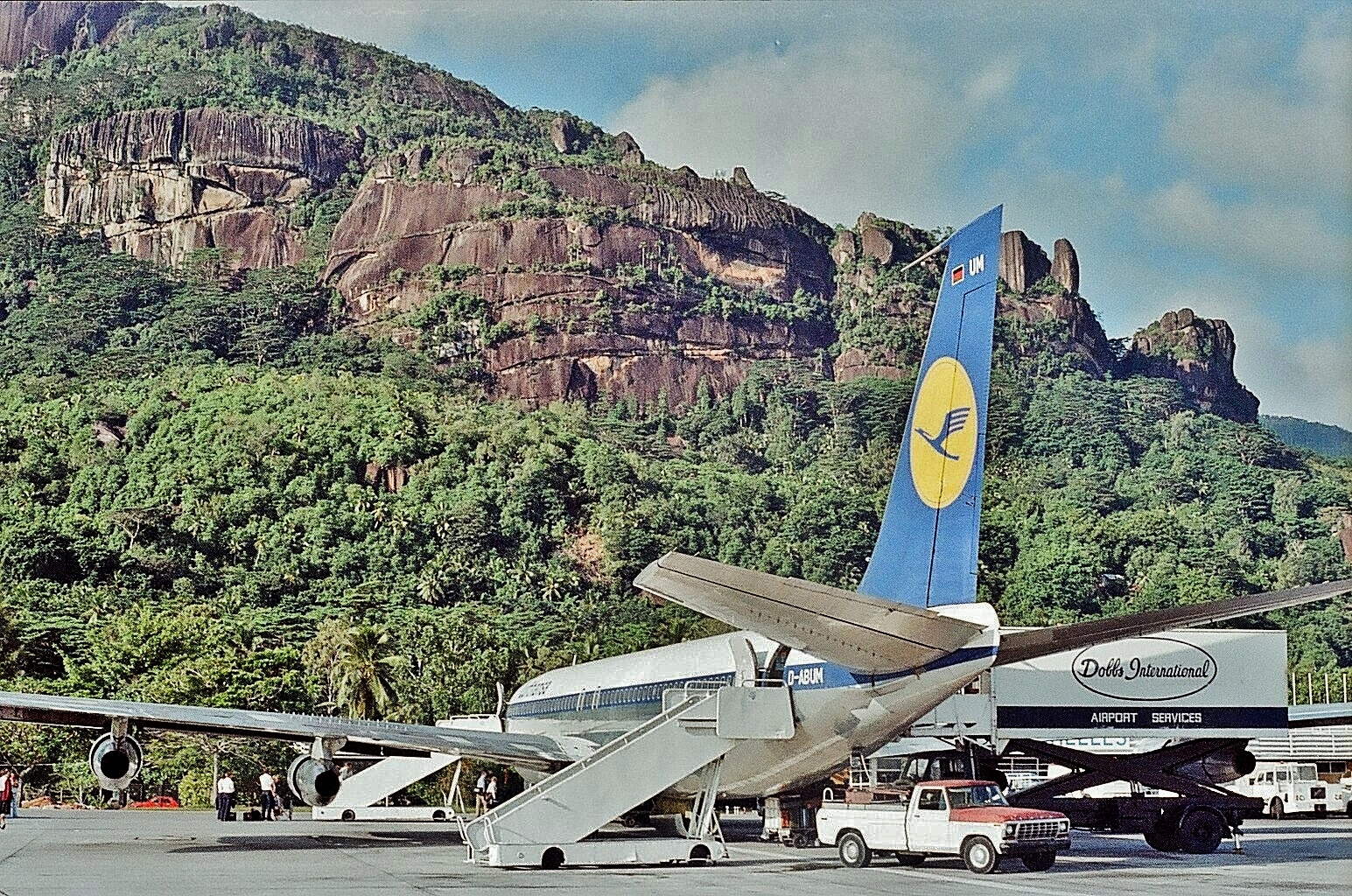
Apron and adjacent mountain in 1981

=== Early years ===
The opening of the Seychelles International Airport took place on 20 March 1972 by Queen Elizabeth II. Wilkenair of Kenya had, however, already started a ferry service between Mombasa and Mahé via Diego Suarez in Madagascar and Astove Island (Seychelles) using a twin engine Piper Navajo the previous year. It operated to the Seychelles once a week. The first pilot to land at Seychelles airport was Tony Bentley-Buckle, who flew his private plane from Mombasa to Mahe via Moroni in March 1971 even before the airfield was complete. The flying time was 9 hours 35 minutes.

This was followed by East African Airways in November 1971 and Luxair in December of the same year. A BOAC Super VC10 was the first jet aircraft to land at Seychelles International Airport on 4 July 1971. At the time of the opening it had a 2987 m runway and a control tower. Ground handling and all other airport operations were carried out by the DCA (Directorate of Civil Aviation).

In 1972, John Faulkner Taylor and Tony Bentley-Buckle founded the first local aircraft company Air Mahé, which operated a Piper PA-34 Seneca between Praslin, Fregate, and Mahé Islands. This aircraft was later replaced by a Britten-Norman Islander. By 1974, over 30 airlines were flying to the Seychelles. Ground handling and all airport operations were being carried out by Aviation Seychelles Company, a company formed in 1973.

Construction works for the substantial expansion of the airport started in July 1980. Due to the continuous increase in passenger traffic, a terminal building was built that could cater for 400 more arriving and 400 more departing passengers at any time. Parking bays for up to six large aircraft were built and a parking area for five light aircraft.

In 1981, there was a gun battle at Seychelles International Airport, as British national Mike Hoare led a team of 43 South African mercenaries masquerading as holidaying rugby players in a coup attempt in what is known as the Seychelles affair. After their hidden weapons were discovered on arrival a skirmish ensued, with most of the mercenaries later escaping in a hijacked Air India jet.

=== Development since the 2000s ===
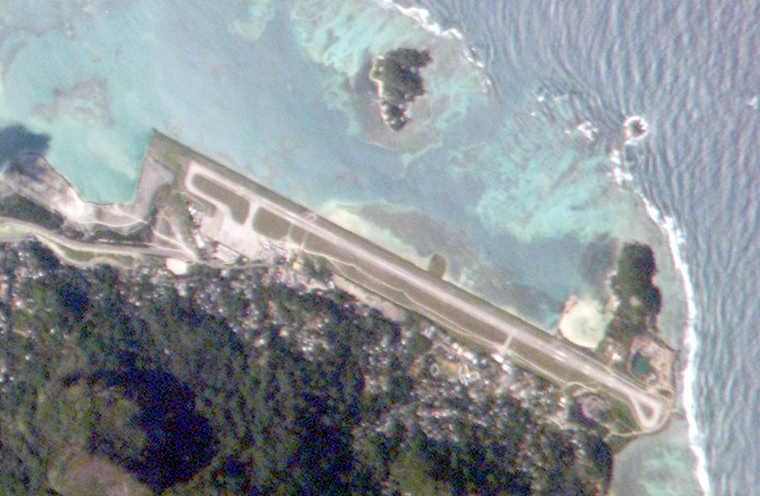
Aerial view in 2005

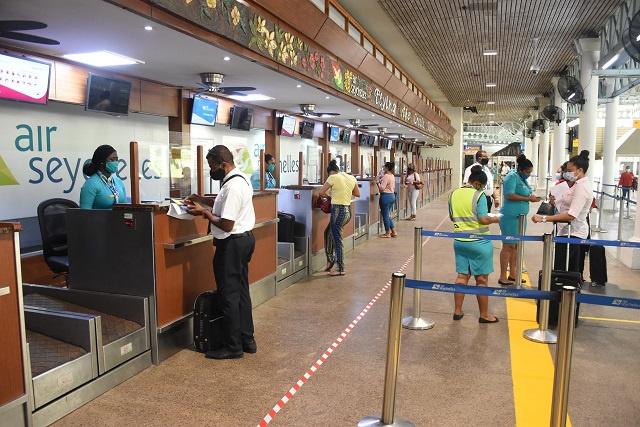
Check-in area

The years 2005 and 2006 brought further development of civil aviation in the Seychelles. The Civil Aviation Authority Act was enacted on 4 April 2006 for the corporatisation of the Directorate of Civil Aviation to Seychelles Civil Aviation Authority. Works started to upgrade and extend the terminal building, which has been further extended to handle at least five medium to large jet aircraft (e.g., Boeing 767 or Airbus A330) as well as six smaller jet aircraft (e.g. Boeing 737 or Airbus A320).

Additional parking areas were made available to the north-east of the airport to handle the parking of charter, business, and long stay aircraft (e.g. some European flights arrive in the morning starting at 7 a.m. but do not depart until 10 p.m. onwards). This reduces jet-lag as any flight that leaves Seychelles at night will get to most Western European cities in the early morning and vice versa from the European cities to the Seychelles; it also provides sufficient rest for operating crews.

The airport has been home to unmanned aerial vehicles operated by the United States Air Force and possibly the Central Intelligence Agency for operations over Somalia and the Horn of Africa. President of Seychelles James Michel apparently welcomed the presence of US drones in Seychelles to combat Somali piracy and terrorism, dating back to at least August 2009. At least two MQ-9 Reaper UAVs have crashed into the Indian Ocean near the airport since December 2011.

== Terminals ==
The domestic terminal is a short distance north of the international terminal and offers inter-island flights with a peak of a departure every 10–15 minutes at busy times which corresponds with international arrivals/departures and every 30 minutes at other times. A cargo terminal is south of the international terminal and handles freight from all international and domestic movements; it is run by Air Seychelles.

A base of the Seychelles Public Defence Force (SPDF) is at the southeastern end of Runway 13 on an island that was joined with Mahé at the construction of the airport.

== Airlines and destinations ==
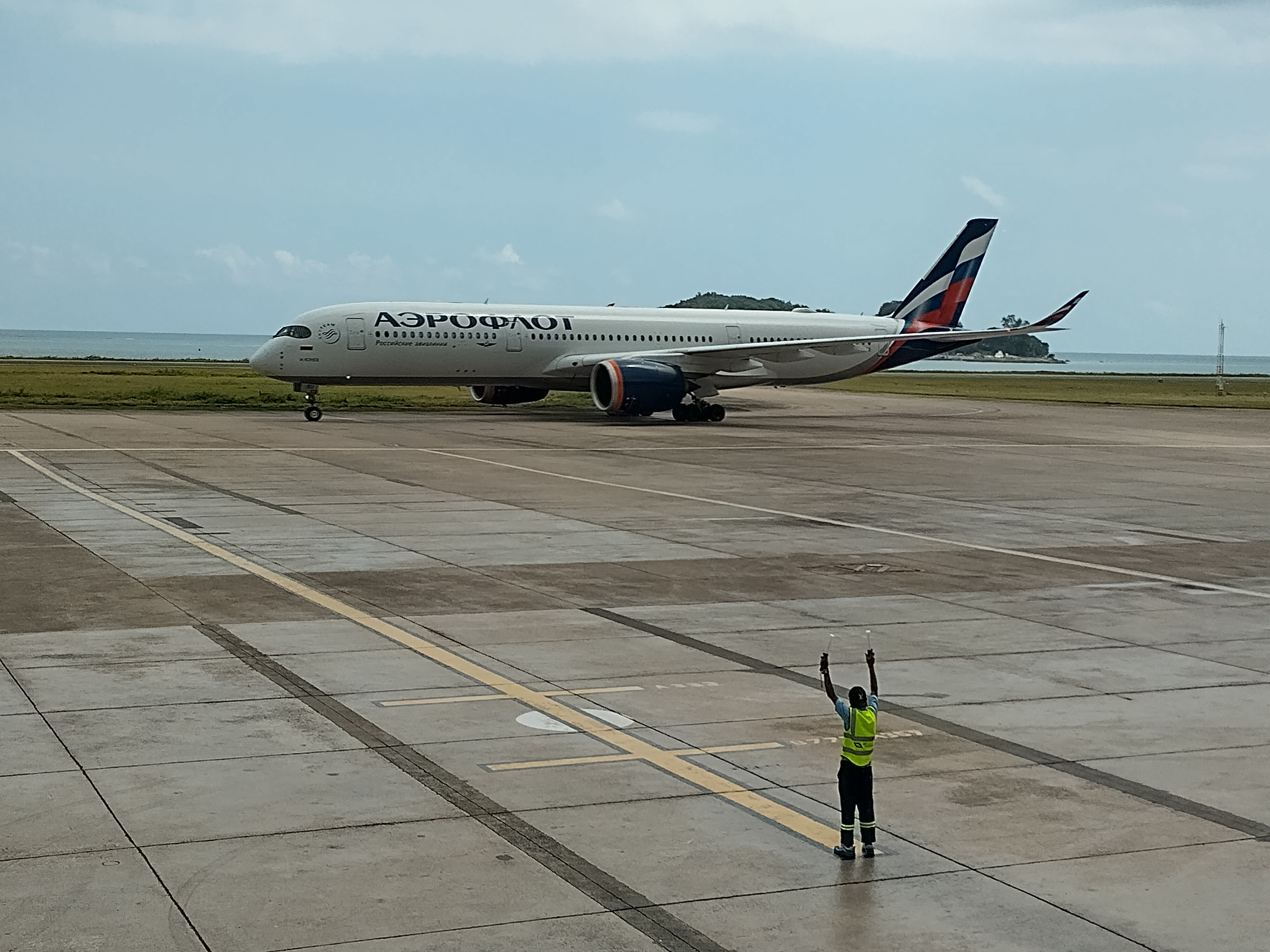
An Aeroflot Airbus A350 at the airport of Seychelles

Airlines	Destinations
Aeroflot	Seasonal: Moscow–Sheremetyevo
Air Seychelles	Abu Dhabi, Colombo–Bandaranaike, Johannesburg–O. R. Tambo, Mauritius, Paris–Charles de Gaulle, Praslin Island, Tel Aviv
Air Tanzania	Dar es Salaam
arkia	Seasonal: Tel Aviv
Condor	Seasonal: Frankfurt
Discover Airlines	Frankfurt
Edelweiss Air	Seasonal: Zürich
Emirates	Antananarivo, Dubai–International
Ethiopian Airlines	Addis Ababa
IndiGo	Mumbai
Kenya Airways	Nairobi–Jomo Kenyatta
Qatar Airways	Doha
Sichuan Airlines	Seasonal: Chengdu–Tianfu
Turkish Airlines	Seasonal: Istanbul

== Statistics ==
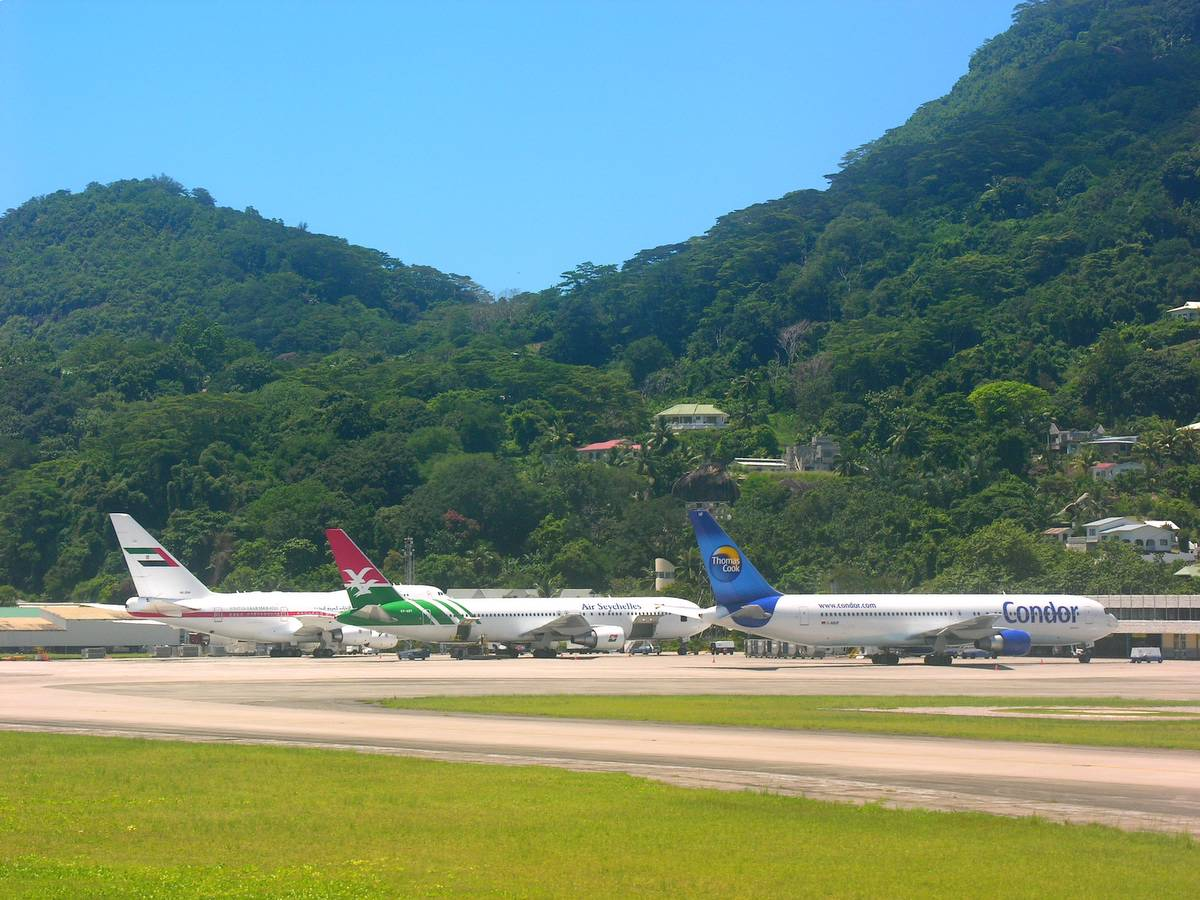
Apron view

Year	Passengers	Change	Cargo international (tonnes)	Change	Aircraft movements (international)	Change
2014	736,558	▲1%	8,124	▲4%	4,774	▼6%
2013	726,524	▲17%	7,807	▲32%	5,080	▲5%
2012	623,017	▼8%	5,943	▼38%	4,843	▲8%
2011	674,306	▲9%	9,613	▲4%	4,479	▼0%
2010	618,675	▲12%	9,242	▲18%	4,480	▲19%
2009	554,408	▼12%	7,829	▼12%	3,751	▼2%
2008	628,504	▼9%	8,880	▲7%	3,832	▲8%
2007	690,661	▲12%	8,300	▲21%	3,532	▲11%
2006	617,348	▲10%	6,883	▲12%	3,194	▼7%
2005	562,221	▲1%	6,165	▲37%	3,446	▲4%
2004	554,760	▼3%	4,515	▼13%	3,327	▲4%
2003	572,512	Steady	5,177	Steady	3,204	Steady

== Ground transport ==
There is frequent service to the bus station in Victoria, with taxi ranks outside the terminal available to all locations on Mahé Island. Several tour operators' coach services also link passengers to the ferry terminal at the Old Port (Vieux Port) for inter-island ferry services and to the New Port (Nouveau port) for cruise holidays.

== See also ==
- Transport in Seychelles
- List of airports in Seychelles
