= Alphonse Airport =

Airport in Seychelles

- IATA: none; ICAO: FSAL

Summary
- Airport type: Private
- Operator: Islands Development Corporation (IDC)
- Serves: Alphonse Island, Seychelles
- Elevation AMSL: 10 ft (3.0 m)
- Coordinates: 07°00′17″S 52°43′34″E
- Website: www.alphonse-island.com/en

Map
- Location of airport in Seychelles

Runways
| Direction | Length | | Surface |
| Direction | m | ft | Surface |
|---|---|---|---|
| 15/33 | 1,150 | 3,773 | Concrete |
- Source: WAD Google Maps

Alphonse Airport (ICAO: FSAL) is an airport serving Alphonse Island, the sole island of the Alphonse Atoll in the Seychelles. The runway is next to the Alphonse Island Resort.

The atoll is 400 kilometres (250 mi) southwest of Mahé, 87 kilometres (54 mi) south of the Amirante Islands, and 3 kilometres (1.9 mi) north of St. François Atoll, the second atoll of Alphonse Group.

== Airlines and destinations ==
IDC Aviation offers flights between Alphonse and Mahé. From October through April there is one scheduled flight per week. Flights depart from Mahé Airport and last approximately one hour.

| Airlines | Destinations |
|---|---|
| Air Seychelles | Charter: Mahé |

== See also ==
- Transport in Seychelles
- List of airports in Seychelles
