= Bertaut Reef =

- Location within Seychelles

Geography
- Location: Indian Ocean
- Coordinates: 05°39′S 53°14′E
- Archipelago: Seychelles
- Adjacent to: Indian Ocean
- Total islands: 1
- Major islands: Bertaut Island
- Area: 0.003 km^{2} (0.0012 sq mi)
- Length: 0.07 km (0.043 mi)
- Width: 0.04 km (0.025 mi)
- Coastline: 0.2 km (0.12 mi)
- Highest elevation: 0 m (0 ft)

Administration
- Seychelles
- Group: Outer Islands
- Sub-Group: Amirante Islands
- Districts: Outer Islands District

Demographics
- Population: 0 (2014)
- Pop. density: 0/km^{2} (0/sq mi)
- Ethnic groups: Creole, French, East Africans, Indians.

Additional information
- Time zone: SCT (UTC+4)
- ISO code: SC-26
- Official website: www.seychelles.travel/en/discover/the-islands/outer-islands

Bertaut Reef is an island in Seychelles, lying in the Outer Islands of Seychelles, with a distance of 271 kilometres (168 miles) south of Victoria, Seychelles.

== Geography ==
Bertaut Reef is about 25 kilometres (16 miles) SSW of St. Joseph Atoll and 13.5 kilometres (8.4 miles) north of Poivre Atoll. Desroches Island is 50 kilometres (31 miles) to the east. The reef measures 8.4 kilometres (5.2 miles) northwest-southeast, and is up to 3.4 kilometres (2.1 miles) wide in the southeastern part, and up to 2.7 kilometres (1.7 miles) in the northwestern part. It covers an area in excess of 20 km^{2}. Only in the south and southeast waves break over a shallow reef edge. Bertaut Reef has a small uninhabited and unvegetated sand cay on its southern part, with an area of about 3000 m^{2}. The reef is steep and the sea breaks heavily over its edge.

== Administration ==
The island belongs to Outer Islands District.

== Image gallery ==
Map 1

District Map

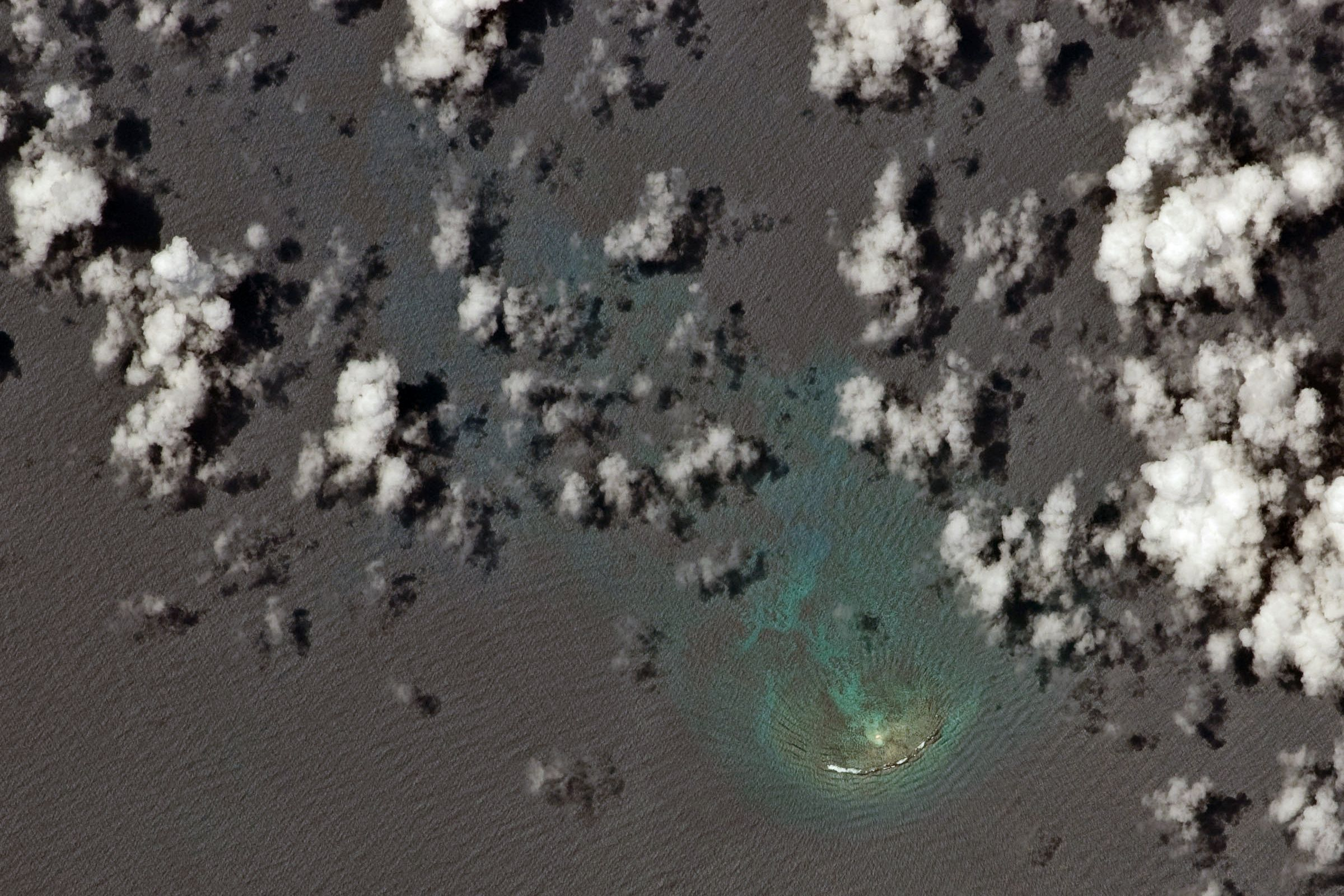
NASA image

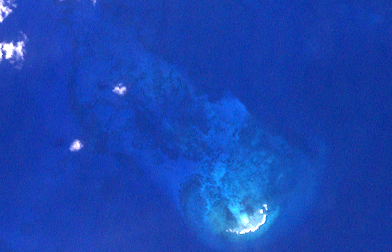
Sat image
