= Lady Denison-Pender Shoal =

- Location within Seychelles

Geography
- Location: Indian Ocean
- Coordinates: 04°49′S 53°20′E
- Type: Shoal
- Archipelago: Seychelles
- Adjacent to: Indian Ocean
- Total islands: 0
- Highest elevation: −15 m (-49 ft)

Administration
- Seychelles
- Group: Outer Islands
- Sub-Group: Amirante Islands
- Districts: Outer Islands District

Demographics
- Ethnic groups: Creole, French, East Africans, Indians.

Additional information
- Time zone: SCT (UTC+4)
- ISO code: SC-26
- Official website: www.seychelles.travel/en/discover/the-islands/outer-islands

Lady Denison-Pender Shoal is a shoal in Seychelles, lying in the Outer Islands of Seychelles, with a distance of 240 km south of Victoria, Seychelles.

== Geography ==
This shoal, with a least depth of 14.6 m, is located immediately north of the Amirantes Bank, but separated from it by water more than 300 m deep. It is located 10 km northwest of North Island on African Banks, the northernmost island of the Amirante Islands. It is named after the cable steamer CS Lady Denison Pender that was built in Glasgow in 1920 and was in service until 1963.

== Administration ==
The shoal belongs to Outer Islands District, for EEZ purposes.
