= FSMA =

FSMA may refer to:

- Ferromagnetic shape-memory alloy, a type of shape memory material which responds to magnetic fields
- Financial Services and Markets Act 2000, a UK law that created the Financial Services Authority
- Financial Services and Markets Authority, a Belgian government agency
- Food Safety Modernization Act, a U.S. law that expands the authority of the Food and Drug Administration
- Marie Louise Island Airport's ICAO code
- Optical fiber connector of type F-SMA (fiber sub-miniature assembly)
