= Remire Reef =

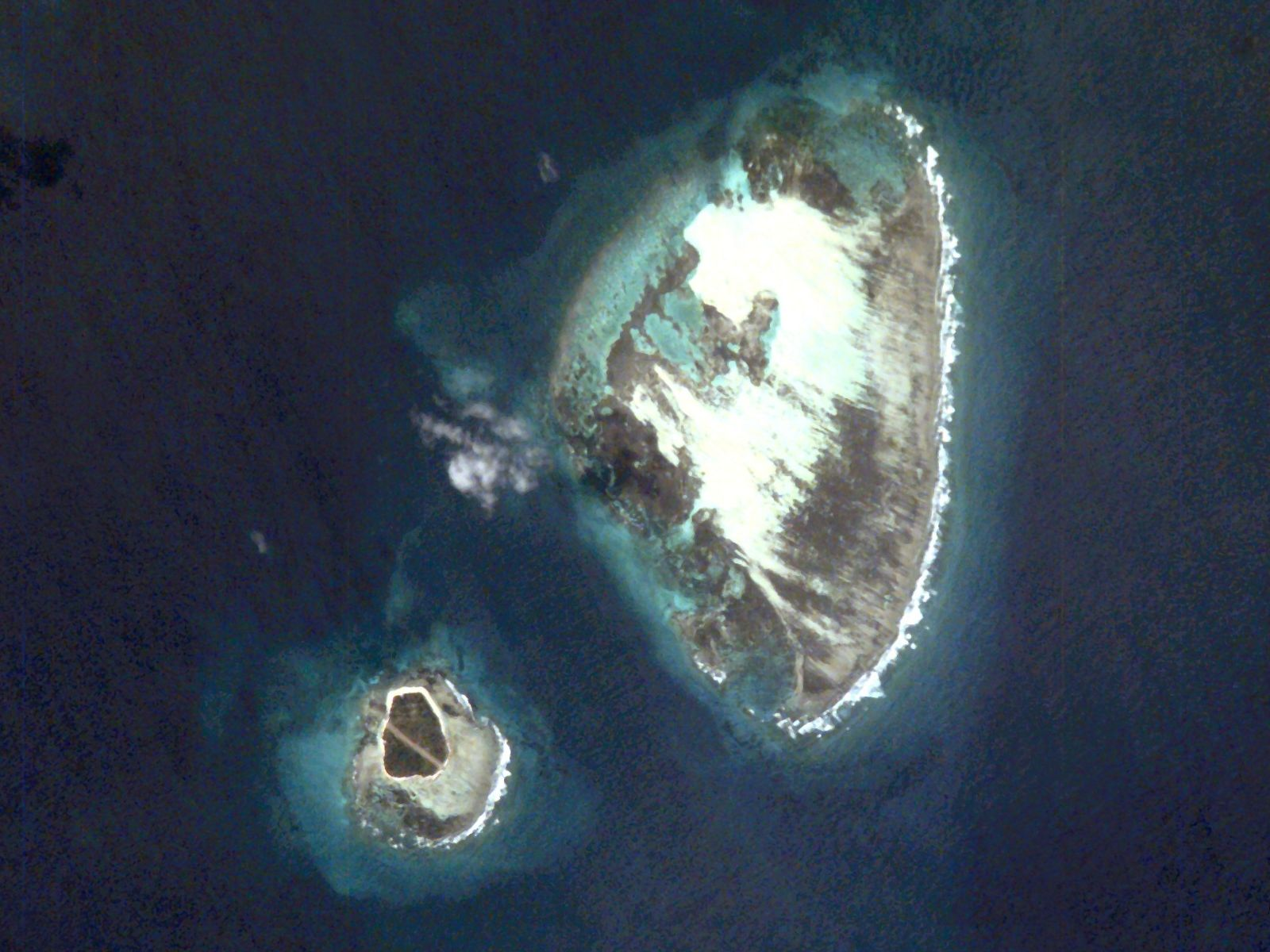
- Remire Reef on the right

- Location within Seychelles

Geography
- Location: Indian Ocean
- Coordinates: 05°05′S 53°21′E
- Archipelago: Seychelles
- Adjacent to: Indian Ocean
- Total islands: 0
- Area: 9.50 km^{2} (3.67 sq mi)
- Highest elevation: 0 m (0 ft)

Administration
- Seychelles
- Group: Outer Islands
- Sub-Group: Amirante Islands
- Districts: Outer Islands District

Demographics
- Ethnic groups: Creole, French, East Africans, Indians.

Additional information
- Time zone: SCT (UTC+4)
- ISO code: SC-26
- Official website: www.seychelles.travel/en/discover/the-islands/outer-islands

Remire Reef is a reef in Seychelles, lying in the Outer Islands of Seychelles, with a distance of 240 km southwest of Victoria, Seychelles.

== Geography ==
Remire Reef dries in patches at low water and extends 4.9 km SSW, with a width of 2.2 km. The reef area is 9.5 km^{2}. There are no islets or cays on the reef. Nearby Remire Island, 2.5 km to the southwest, is clearly detached and separated from Remire Reef by a deep channel.

== Administration ==
The reef belongs to Outer Islands District.

Map 1
