= Alphonse Atoll =

Island in the Seychelles

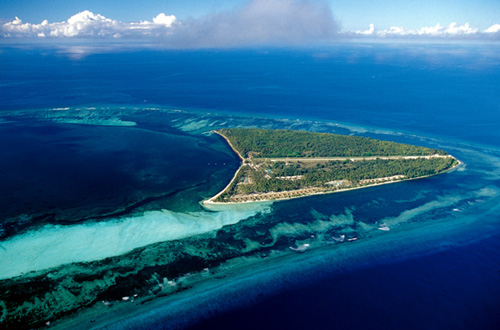

- Location within Seychelles

Geography
- Location: Indian Ocean
- Coordinates: 07°01′S 52°44′E
- Archipelago: Seychelles
- Adjacent to: Indian Ocean
- Total islands: 1
- Major islands: Alphonse
- Area: 1.71 km^{2} (0.66 sq mi)
- Length: 1.8 km (1.12 mi)
- Width: 1.4 km (0.87 mi)
- Coastline: 5.5 km (3.42 mi)
- Highest elevation: 0 m (0 ft)

Administration
- Seychelles
- Group: Outer Islands
- Sub-Group: Alphonse Group
- Districts: Outer Islands District
- Largest settlement: Alphonse (pop. 75)

Demographics
- Population: 82 (2014)
- Pop. density: 48/km^{2} (124/sq mi)
- Ethnic groups: Creole, French, East Africans, Indians.

Additional information
- Time zone: SCT (UTC+4)
- ISO code: SC-26
- Official website: www.alphonse-island.com/en/

Alphonse Atoll is one of two atolls of the Alphonse Group, the other being St. François Atoll — both in the Outer Islands (Coralline Seychelles) coral archipelago of the Seychelles.

== Geography ==
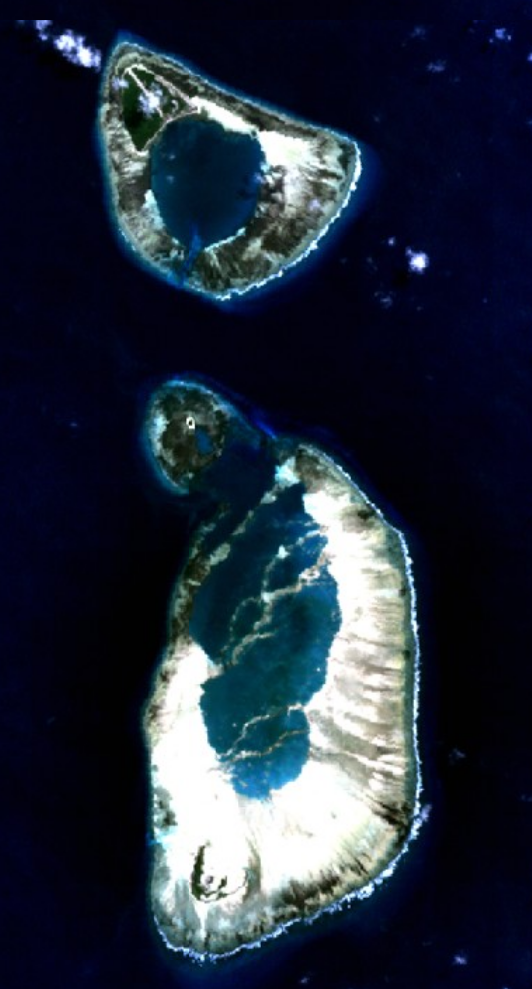
Satellite image of Alphonse Group (Alphonse Atoll in the north)

Alphonse Atoll lies 87 kilometres (54 miles) south of the main Amirantes bank, from which it is separated by deep water. It has a distance of 400 kilometres (250 miles) south of Victoria, Seychelles. Alphonse lies just two kilometres (1.2 miles) north of St. François Atoll, separated from it by a deep channel. The atoll has just one island, Alphonse Island, with a population of 108 people who work in the Alphonse hotel or maintain the runway and island for the IDC.

The area of the island is 1.71 square kilometres (0.66 square miles). The total area of the atoll, with 5.5 kilometres (3 miles) in diameter, is 19 square kilometres (7 square miles), including reef flat and lagoon.

== History ==
In 1562 the whole of the Alphonse Group (Alphonse, St. François and Bijoutier) was collectively named on Portuguese charts as San Francisco. Chevalier Alphonse de Pontevez commanding the French frigate Le Lys visited on 27 June 1730 and gave the islands his own name. The following day he visited and named the neighboring island of St. François possibly following the former Portuguese name for the group. A small resort hotel was built on Alphonse Island in 1999, the island was a private plantation, only opened in 1999 to the public. in 2007 it was bought 50% by LUX hotels branch of Desroches and then sold to Great Plains Group due to financial difficulties. After a failed attempt to build an extreme luxury villa development it was sold in 2013 to Alphonse Island Lodge LTD founded by Murray Collins and Keith Rose-Innes. The Alphonse Island hotel was renovated in 2014 to include luxury beach villas and beach suites. Alphonse island is an activity oriented destination and is owner-operated by the ecotourism brand Blue Safari Seychelles and fly fishing brand Alphonse Fishing Company.

== Flora and fauna ==
In 2007, Island Conservation Society established a conservation center on Alphonse to manage conservation on the island and on neighboring St. François.

Wedge-tailed shearwaters breed despite the presence of rats and cats. The common waxbill (probably introduced) breeds and is found nowhere else in Seychelles other than Mahe and La Digue. The introduced house sparrow also breeds. The isolation of Alphonse acts as a magnet to migratory birds and Seychelles Bird Records Committee has recorded more bird species here than anywhere south of the granitics apart from Aldabra, including the only record of sociable lapwing for the entire southern hemisphere and the first country records of red knot, tufted duck and common chiffchaff. Recently Alphonse island Hotel, The Island Development Company and The Island Conservation Society set up an Alphonse Foundation to fund the conservation efforts on Alphonse Island, Bijoutier and St Francois.

== Transport ==
The island is bisected by a 1,220 metres (4,000 ft) Alphonse Airport (ICAO code:FSAL) that crosses the island diagonally. The airfield was renovated in 2000, and is now serviced between two and five times a week with an IDC operated flights.

== Image gallery ==
Map 1

District map of the Outer Islands
