= François Julien du Dresnay =

Governor of Isle de France and Isle Bourbon
- In office 1768–1772

Personal details
- Born: 28 January 1719 Saint-Pol-de-Léon, France
- Died: 12 August 1786 (aged 67) Kerlaudy, France

Military service
- Branch/service: French Navy
- Rank: Chef d'escadre

François-Julien du Dresnay des Roches (28 January 1719, Saint-Pol-de-Léon — Kerlaudy, 12 August 1786) was a French Navy officer and colonial administrator of the 18th century. Desroches Island was named in his honour.

== Biography ==
Desroches was born the third son to Marie Gabrielle Thérèse le Jar de Clesmear and to Joseph Marie du Dresnay des Roches, a Captain in the French Navy. His father died soon after he was born.

Desroches joined the Navy in 1734. He was promoted to Ensign in 1741, and to aide-major in 1751..He was knighted in the Order of Saint Louis in 1747. In 1752, he was one of the founders of the Académie de marine, of which he became assistant director in 1756. He was promoted to Captain in 1757, and given command of Dragon in 1761, part of the squadron under Blénac.

In 1768, Desroches was appointed governor of Isle de France and Isle Bourbon. He held the position until 1772, before returning to France. In 1776, he was promoted to Chef d'escadre. In 1780, Desroches married Marie Émilie de Caumont Gauville.

== Notes and references ==
- Jullien de Courcelles, Histoire généalogique et héraldique des pairs de France,…, vol. 10, 1829, p. 154 [lire en ligne]
- Denis Diderot, Quatre contes, p. 185, [lire en ligne]
- Dictionnaire de biographie mauricienne, pp. 42–43
- Ministère de la marine et des colonies, Revue maritime et coloniale, vol. 73, 1882, p. 423
