= Rémire Island =

Island in the Seychelles

Nickname: Eagle Island
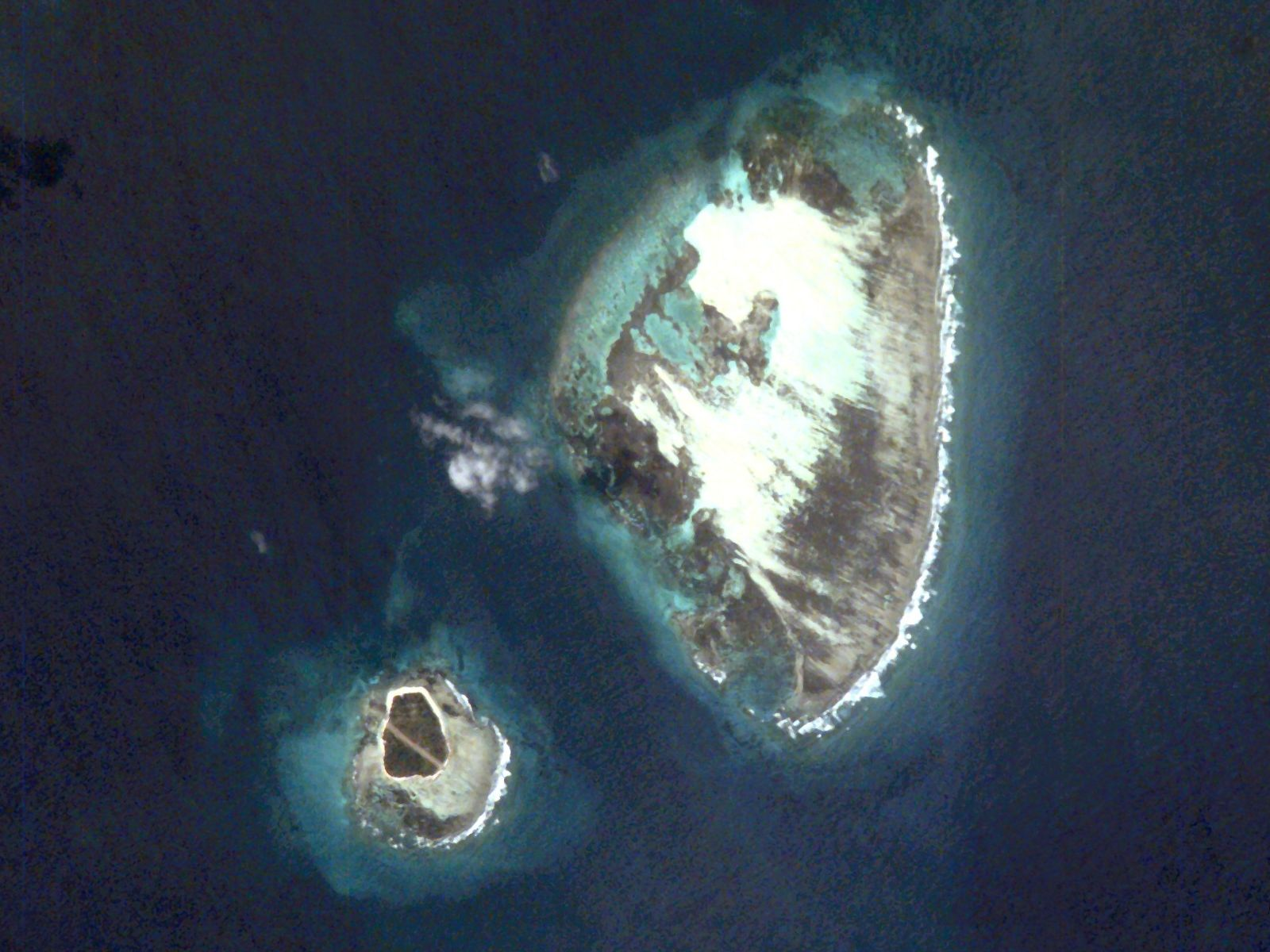
- Rémire Island (left) and Remire Reef (right), photo of NASA

- Location within Seychelles

Geography
- Location: Indian Ocean
- Coordinates: 05°07′S 53°19′E
- Archipelago: Seychelles
- Adjacent to: Indian Ocean
- Total islands: 1
- Major islands: Rémire
- Area: 0.30 km^{2} (0.12 sq mi)
- Length: 0.65 km (0.404 mi)
- Width: 0.5 km (0.31 mi)
- Coastline: 2.1 km (1.3 mi)
- Highest elevation: 7 m (23 ft)

Administration
- Seychelles
- Group: Outer Islands
- Sub-Group: Amirante Islands
- Sub-Group: Rémire Islands
- Districts: Outer Islands District
- Largest settlement: Rémire (pop. 6)

Demographics
- Population: 6 (2014)
- Pop. density: 20/km^{2} (50/sq mi)
- Ethnic groups: Creole, French, East Africans, Indians.

Additional information
- Time zone: SCT (UTC+4)
- ISO code: SC-26
- Official website: www.seychelles.travel/en/discover/the-islands/outer-islands

Rémire Island, or Eagle Island, is an island in Seychelles, lying in the Outer Islands of Seychelles, with a distance of 245 km south of Victoria, Seychelles.

== History ==
Rémire Island bears the name of an English ship which visited it in 1771 by the Chevalier de la Billière. In 1935 the ship Diego of Mauritius went ashore in a gale off Rémire. It probably struck the reef. Cast on a small island the passengers and crew of 68, which included a lady of some 100 years old and a 6-month-old baby were finally rescued. Between the years 1950 and 1960, Rémire had a Guano mining camp. It was heavily exploited for its guano, more than 100,000 tons of compacted sea birds manure was mined and heavily excavated particularly by the Seychelles Guano Company. In 1960 the workers where evicted and the Guano mine closed. Between 1960 and 1970 it was the home for Wendy Veevers-Carter (daughter of Clarence Day), who lived there with her husband Mark Veevers-Carter. She described the island in detail in Island Home by in 1970 the island became uninhabited, and was reserved (not for sale) as a presidential retreat in case of a coup d'état until 2010. in 2010, the IDC took charge of the island and stationed a handful of workers there to keep the island clean, tend the coconut plantation, clean the airstrip, and to build a small number of chalets. In 2012, The IDC has opened a small guest house on the north-west coast.

== Geography ==
Rémire Island has a size of 0.3 km^{2}. It is located 2.5 km west of the southern extremity of Remire Reef, detached from it and a separate geographical unit. It is about halfway between African Banks, which is 25 km north, and D'Arros Island, 31.5 km south. It has trees over 15 m high.

== Demographics ==
There is a small settlement on the western shore. the IDC plans to build a hotel instead of the guesthouses

== Administration ==
The island belongs to Outer Islands District. Being an island with a small population, there are not any government buildings or services. For many services, people have to go to Victoria, which is a difficult task.

== Transport ==
The island is bisected by a 460 metres (1,510 ft) paved airstrip (ICAO code FSSR) that follows the west–east axis. The island is occasionally serviced by an Island Development Company (IDC) aircraft from Mahé.

== Economics ==
The inhabitants on the island are engaged in very small scale farming and fishing which are mainly for the island consumption.

== Flora and fauna ==
The island is known for its rich fish life. A variety of seabirds including the fairy tern and lesser noddy are seen on the island, but the number of birds has declined over the years. In the early 1990s, peacocks were introduced to the island.

== Image gallery ==
Map 1

District Map
