= Remire =

Remire or Rémire may refer to:

- Remire-Montjoly, a commune of French Guiana
- Remire Island, one of the Amirante Islands in the Seychelles
