= Save Our Seas Foundation =

Philanthropy organization

- Formation: 23 September 2003; 22 years ago in Geneva, Switzerland
- Legal status: Philanthropic organization
- Purpose: Research, conservation and education
- Location: Geneva, Switzerland (Headquarters)
- Region served: Worldwide
- Fields: Sharks, rays and skates
- Website: www.saveourseas.com

The Save Our Seas Foundation is a philanthropic organization founded in Geneva, Switzerland, on 23 September 2003.

Focusing primarily on threatened wildlife, mainly endangered elasmobranchs and their habitats, the Save Our Seas Foundation supports research, conservation and education projects worldwide.

== Background ==
There are approximately 400 species of sharks worldwide. Sharks have existed for over 500 million years, appearing in every ocean. As apex predators, they contribute to the stability of marine ecosystems.

Due to threats such as overfishing, climate change, habitat loss and persecution, many shark populations have declined by more than 90%. Over 100 million sharks are killed annually in commercial fishing, resulting in such severe declines that more than a quarter of shark species and their relatives are considered Threatened or Near Threatened with extinction on the International Union for Conservation of Nature (IUCN).

Despite these declines, comparatively few shark species are listed under Appendix II of the Convention on International Trade in Endangered Species of Wild Fauna and Flora (CITES), which poses strict controls on the international trade in listed species. The first sharks to be included were basking and whale sharks in 2003, and by 2016 a total of 12 shark species and all manta and devil ray species were listed in Appendix II, as well as sawfish species in Appendix I. In 2019 a further 18 species were added (mako sharks, guitarfishes and wedgefishes).

While progress has been made to improve the management and conservation of shark populations globally, more than 80% of the international shark fin trade that drives shark fisheries is unregulated. Most sharks and ray species are highly vulnerable to overfishing, as they grow slowly, mature late and live for a long time. They typically fulfill an important role as predators in their ecosystems, so the decline of shark populations is likely to have a cascading effect on the abundance and distribution of other species, threatening ecosystems and food supplies with unpredictable consequences.

== Education and research centers ==
=== The Save Our Seas Foundation Shark Education Center ===
Situated at the edge of False Bay in Cape Town, South Africa, the Save Our Seas Foundation Shark Education Centre was established in 2008 on the doorstep of the Dalebrook Marine Protected Area, a sanctuary zone within the greater Table Mountain National Park Marine Protected Area. The centre is open throughout the year for school and public visits.

=== The Save Our Seas Foundation D'Arros Research Centre ===
The Save Our Seas Foundation D'Arros Research Centre (SOSF-DRC) is based on D'Arros Island, 225 kilometres south-west of Mahé, in the Amirantes, Seychelles. D'Arros Island is separated from St Joseph Atoll by a channel one kilometre (0.6 mile) wide and 70 metres (230 feet) deep. The marine environment surrounding D'Arros Island and St Joseph Atoll has a high diversity of habitats and species, providing a suitable ocean observatory for scientific studies.

Since its inception in 2012, the centre has concluded numerous targeted research projects in collaboration with various international institutions. These diverse projects have focused mostly on threatened species such as sharks, turtles, seabirds, fish and corals, but have also included habitat assessments, feasibility surveys and oceanography.

=== The Save Our Seas Shark Research Center USA ===
The Save Our Seas Shark Research Center USA is located in Florida, US, and was established at Nova Southeastern University in 2009. Nova Southeastern University is also home to the Guy Harvey Research Institute and the Center of Excellence for Coral Reef Ecosystems Research, both of which conduct collaborative research with the Save Our Seas Shark Research Center.

It specializes in taking integrative, multi-disciplinary approaches to research and conservation, which include combining high-tech genetics, genomics and field work to illuminate holistic aspects of shark and ray science that would be difficult to decipher using single-discipline approaches alone.

In February 2019, scientists decoded the genome of the white shark and discovered insights that may explain why these sharks have survived over millennia. This discovery may impact how we understand and manage human age-related diseases in the future.

== Foundation grants ==
The Save Our Seas Foundation offers a series of grants dedicated mainly to projects on elasmobranchs (sharks, rays and skates). Most of these projects currently fall into the areas of research, conservation and education and are capable of attracting significant public attention, potentially increasing public and government awareness of the urgent need to protect the marine environment.

Sawfish, wedgefish and guitarfish are some of the most threatened species in the oceans, but little is known about them. Since 2017, the foundation has decided to focus on protecting this rare category of fishes.

== Partners ==
The foundation has several long-term partners: the Manta Trust, the Bimini Biological Field Station Foundation, Shark Spotters, BC Whales, and the Acoustic Tracking Array Platform (ATAP). It provides funding and guidance for their projects, facilitates international cooperation among researchers and maintains an active communication link to forge a global conservation plan of action.

== See also ==
- List of sharks
- List of threatened rays
- List of threatened sharks
- Marine conservation
- Red List Index
- Shark finning
- Sustainability and environmental management
- Sustainable fishery
