= Delosia ornata =

Conservation status
- Critically Endangered (IUCN 3.1)

Scientific classification
- Kingdom: Animalia
- Phylum: Arthropoda
- Clade: Pancrustacea
- Class: Insecta
- Order: Blattodea
- Family: Ectobiidae
- Genus: Delosia
- Species: D. ornata

Binomial name
- Delosia ornata Bolivar, 1925

Species of cockroach

Delosia ornata is a species of cockroach in the family Ectobiidae. It is endemic to Desroches Island in Seychelles.

In its latest assessment for The IUCN Red List of Threatened Species in 2007, the species was categorized as Critically Endangered.

== Description ==
Described in 1924, the species was known only from the holotype male until a female and two nymphs were discovered in 2006.

== Habitat and distribution ==
The species is endemic to Desroches Island in Seychelles. A 1997 article published in Oriental Insects notes that the species has also been reported from Sri Lanka. It inhabits coastal woodland fragments, thriving in deep leaf litter dominated by Hernandia nymphaefolia and Guettada speciosa.

Threats to its habitat include historical deforestation for coconut plantations in 1906, leaving only small woodland fragments (<100 m2) for its survival. An extensive fire in 2007 damaged woodland habitat, and the potential impact of this on the coastal woodland remnant remains uncertain. While some areas have regenerated to 1000 m2, in 2012, it was reported to be facing a severe threat from a planned hotel development jeopardizing its entire range. The island, all less than 1 m above sea level, faces further threats from rising sea levels.

== Conservation ==
In 2006, it was estimated that there were fewer than 300 adult individuals and 600 juveniles of the species.

The species was classified as Critically Endangered in its most recent assessment for The IUCN Red List of Threatened Species in 2007.
