= African Banks =

Islands in the western Indian Ocean

Nickname: Îlots Africains

- Location within Seychelles

Geography
- Location: Indian Ocean
- Coordinates: 04°54′S 53°20′E
- Archipelago: Seychelles
- Adjacent to: Indian Ocean
- Total islands: 2
- Major islands: African North Island; African South Island
- Area: 0.039 km^{2} (0.015 sq mi)
- Length: 0.45 km (0.28 mi)
- Width: 0.09 km (0.056 mi)
- Coastline: 1 km (0.6 mi)
- Highest elevation: 3 m (10 ft)

Administration
- Seychelles
- Group: Outer Islands
- Sub-Group: Amirante Islands
- Sub-Group: African Banks
- Districts: Outer Islands District

Demographics
- Population: 0 (2014)
- Pop. density: 0/km^{2} (0/sq mi)
- Ethnic groups: Creole, French, East Africans, Indians.

Additional information
- Time zone: SCT (UTC+4)
- ISO code: SC-26
- Official website: www.seychelles.travel/en/discover/the-islands/outer-islands

The African Banks are the uninhabited northernmost islands of the Amirante Islands, of the Outer Islands of the Republic of Seychelles, in the western Indian Ocean.

== History ==
The islands were discovered in 1797 and named Îlots Africains by Admiral Willaumez commanding the frigate La Régénérée. North Island had for a couple of months a guano mining camp.

== Geography ==
The African Banks lie about 230 km west of the city of Victoria on the main Seychelles island of Mahé, close to the edge of the Amirantes Bank. The nearest island is Remire Island, lying 27 km south. The group is a pseudo-atoll, has two small islands, which are gradually undergoing coastal erosion, and appear as just small sandstone ridges exposed only at low tide. The underwater banks extend over 4 kilometres (2.5 miles) north-south and 3 kilometres (1.9 miles) east-west and occupy a total area of about 10 square kilometres (3.9 square miles). With a shallow coral ring, it appears as an incomplete atoll. To the west of the coral ring, however, it is 19 to 36 metres (62–118 feet) deep.

=== North Island ===
North Island ( fr. Île du Nord ) is small and flat with an area of 3.3 hectares (8.2 acres). It has a derelict automatic lighthouse on the north point. and is occasionally visited by tourists in charter yachts. It was formed from sandstone, is almost treeless (one coconut tree in 1995), and covered by grass and low-growing vegetation (shrubland). It is significant as a nesting site for terns, the colonies of which are subject to frequent exploitation and disturbance by poachers.

=== South Island ===
South Island ( fr. Île du Sud ) is a small and flat island with an area of 0.6 hectares (1.5 acres). It lies 3.1 kilometres (1.9 miles) south of North Island. It has a small ruin of a poachers hut. HMS Spitfire was wrecked on South Island in August 1801.

== Flora & Fauna ==
The islands, with an associated tract of coastal marine habitat, form a 750-hectare (1,900-acre) Important Bird Area (IBA), identified as such by BirdLife International because it supports populations of black-naped (10 breeding pairs) and sooty terns (5000–10,000 pairs), and brown noddies (2000–5900 pairs). green and hawksbill sea turtles nest there. African Banks are surrounded by coral rim (the eastern side) and waters rich in fish, especially mackerel, tuna and sharks.
