= Marie Louise Island =

Coral island in the Seychelles

- Location within Seychelles

Geography
- Location: Indian Ocean
- Coordinates: 06°10′S 53°08′E
- Archipelago: Seychelles
- Adjacent to: Indian Ocean
- Total islands: 1
- Major islands: Marie Louise
- Area: 0.556 km^{2} (0.215 sq mi)
- Length: 1.2 km (0.75 mi)
- Width: 0.6 km (0.37 mi)
- Coastline: 3 km (1.9 mi)
- Highest elevation: 9 m (30 ft)

Administration
- Seychelles
- Group: Outer Islands
- Sub-Group: Amirante Islands
- Districts: Outer Islands District
- Largest settlement: Marie Louise (pop. 15)

Demographics
- Population: 142 (2014)
- Pop. density: 255.4/km^{2} (661.5/sq mi)
- Ethnic groups: Creole, French, East Africans, Indians.

Additional information
- Time zone: SCT (UTC+4)
- ISO code: SC-26
- Official website: www.seychelles.travel/en/discover/the-islands/outer-islands

Marie Louise Island is a low-lying coral island in the Amirantes group of the Outer Islands of the Republic of Seychelles, in the western Indian Ocean, with a distance of 308 km south-west of Victoria, Seychelles.

== History ==
The Island was named by the Chevalier du Roslan in 1771 after his ship Marie Louise. Since the end of the 19th century, the island has been leased and inhabited without interruption. In 1905, the population numbered 86. There was an export of 3500 tons of guano that year. Guano had been the main economy until 1963, when still 3000 tons were produced. Additional products were copra and dried fish.

In the 1980s there have been attempts in developing the island into a tourist destination. Some bungalows were constructed. The attempts failed because of air traffic limitations due to the large number of seabirds. Additionally, aircraft landing is difficult, because of the steep coast that is littered with rocks.

The prison on Marie Louise built in 2012 to house mostly convicted drug traffickers closed down in 2017. The prison facilities will be used by the Seychelles Defence Forces for the training of recruits.

== Geography ==
Marie Louise Island, with an area of 55.6 ha, is located at the southern end of the Amirantes 13 km from its nearest neighbor, Desnoeufs Island. The island is a low and sandy coral cay, roughly oval in shape, and has a maximum elevation of 9 m. More than half of the island, in the northwestern part, is cultivated with coconut palms. There is a coral reef on the east side of the island which breaks. Landing by boat is difficult.

== Demographics ==
It is permanently inhabited with a population of about 11. 6 are IDC staff members, 1 is a medic person for the island, and there is one remaining family at the original village. The villagers are agricultural workers and beach fishermen and are based in a small settlement on the north-west coast above the beach and opposite the only safe anchorage.

There were also 98 inmates in the state prison guarded by 3 Seychelles officers, and 30 gurkha security guards. With a population of 142 as of February 2015, this made Marie Louise Island the most populated of the Amirantes at that time. However, the prison was closed in 2017.

== Administration ==
The island belongs to Outer Islands District. Being an island with a small population, there are not any government buildings or services. For many services, people have to go to Victoria, which is a difficult task.

== Transport ==
The island is bisected by a 550 metres (1,800 ft) unpaved airstrip (ICAO code FSMA) that follows the north–south axis. currently there are no regular air services.

== Economics ==
The inhabitants on the island are engaged in very small scale farming and fishing which are mainly for the island consumption.

== Flora and fauna ==
The vegetation is dominated by coconut-palms and Casuarina equisetifolia trees. It is used as a support base for the harvesting of sooty tern eggs on neighbouring Desnoeufs Island during the nesting season from June to August. Marie Louise has been identified as an Important Bird Area (IBA) by BirdLife International because it supports breeding colonies of brown (2000 pairs) and lesser noddies (3500 pairs), and white terns (3000 pairs). Green and hawksbill sea turtles also nest there. The island is known for its rich marine life.

== Image gallery ==
Map 1

District Map

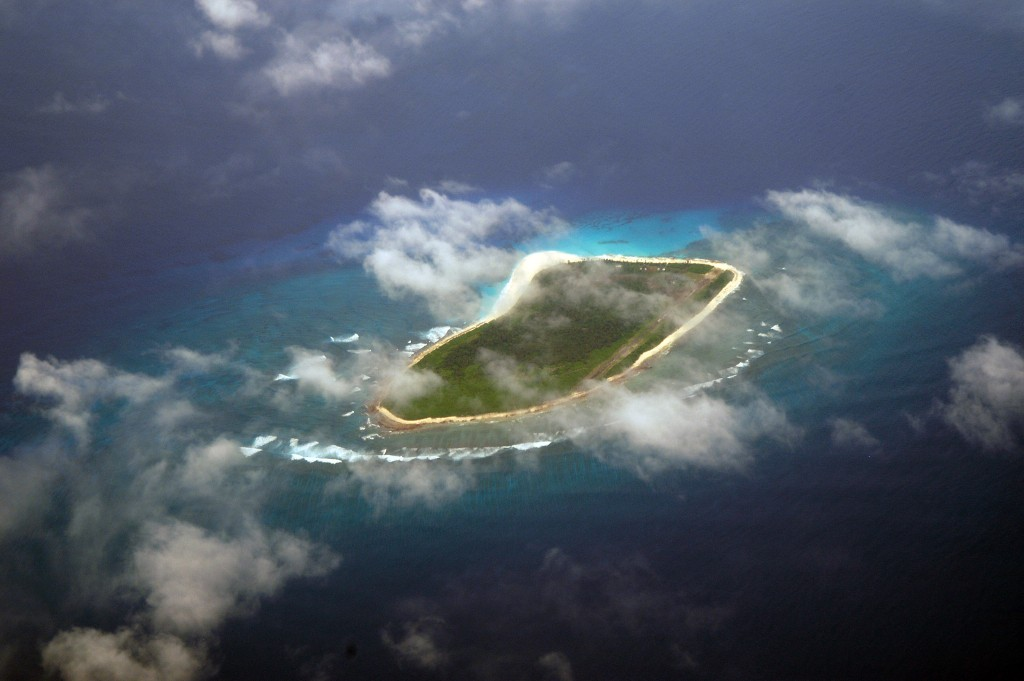
Aerial view of the island
