= Remire Island Airport =

Airport in Seychelles

Remire Island Airport Eagle Island Airport
- IATA: none; ICAO: FSSR

Summary
- Airport type: Private
- Operator: Islands Development Corporation (IDC)
- Serves: Remire Island, Seychelles
- Elevation AMSL: 9 ft / 3 m
- Coordinates: 05°07′00″S 53°18′42″E

Map
- Location of the airport in Seychelles

Runways
Direction	Length		Surface
Direction	m	ft	Surface
14/32	478	1,568	Concrete
- Sources: GCM Google Maps

Remire Island Airport (ICAO: FSSR) is an airfield serving Remire Island in the Seychelles. It has the shortest runway of all aerodromes in the Seychelles.

== See also ==
- Transport in Seychelles
- List of airports in Seychelles
