= St. Joseph Atoll =

Atoll in the Seychelles

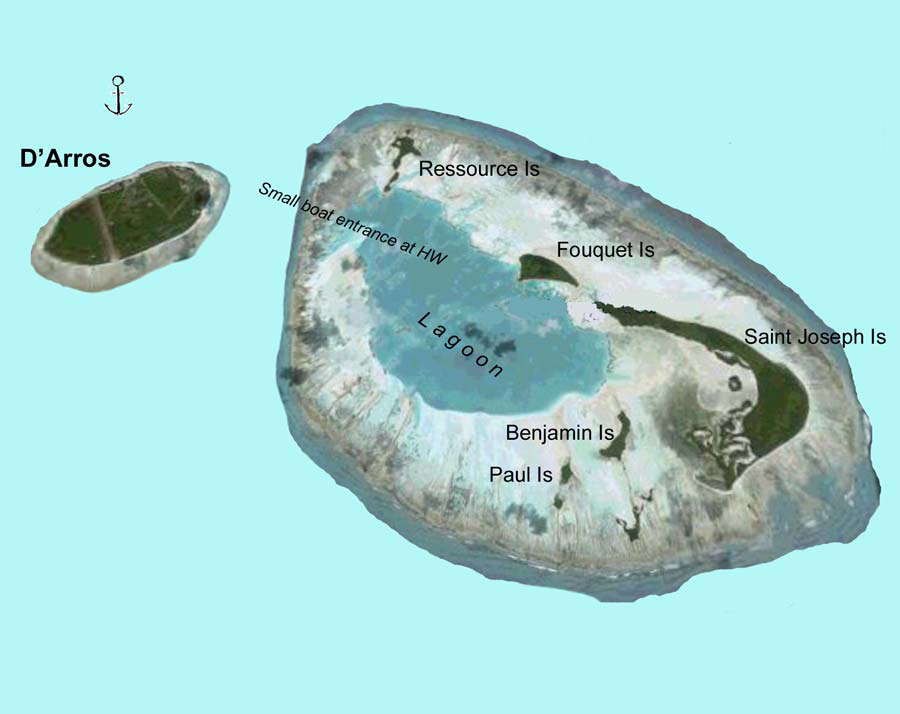
- Map of D'Arros Island and neighboring St. Joseph Atoll, part of the Amirante Islands group

- Location within Seychelles

Geography
- Location: Indian Ocean
- Coordinates: 05°24′S 53°18′E
- Type: Atoll
- Archipelago: Seychelles
- Adjacent to: Indian Ocean
- Total islands: 13
- Major islands: St. Joseph; Fouquet; Benjamin; Paul; Ressource
- Area: 1.632 km^{2} (0.630 sq mi)
- Highest elevation: 3 m (10 ft)

Administration
- Seychelles
- Group: Outer Islands
- Sub-Group: Amirante Islands
- Sub-Group: D'Arros and St. Joseph Atoll Special Reserve
- Districts: Outer Islands District
- Largest settlement: St. Joseph (pop. 0)

Demographics
- Population: 0 (2014)
- Pop. density: 0/km^{2} (0/sq mi)
- Ethnic groups: Creole, French, East Africans, Indians.

Additional information
- Time zone: SCT (UTC+4)
- ISO code: SC-26
- Official website: www.seychelles.travel/en/discover/the-islands/outer-islands

Saint Joseph Atoll is part of the Amirante Islands group, which are in the Outer Islands (Coralline Seychelles) coral archipelago of the Seychelles islands and nation. The atoll is located southwest of the granitic Inner Seychelles archipelago, with a distance of 248 km south of Victoria, Seychelles.

== History ==
The atoll was discovered in 1770 by European sailors.

Private atoll

In 1960, The island became the property of a Seychellois family, who built a coconut plantation on the bigger St. Joseph island.

Nature preserve

In August 2012 it was revealed that the atoll was sold, together with D'Arros Island, for US$60 million, to be managed by the Save Our Seas Foundation.

== Geography ==
Saint Joseph Atoll is located only 2.3 kilometres (1.4 mi) east of the eastern part of D'Arros Island, but it is a separate geographical unit, separated by 60–62 metres (197–203 ft) deep water of a 1 kilometre (0.62 mi) wide channel, which is deeper than much of the Amirantes Bank. The land area of the Atoll occupies 1.21 square kilometres (0.47 mi^{2}). The main Saint Joseph island is of crescent shaped, flat coral sand cay, 2.2 kilometres (1.4 mi) long and with average 0.4 kilometres (0.25 mi) wide, and nowhere higher than 3 metres (9.8 ft). The tree tops are about 24 m high.

=== Coral reefs ===
The Atoll stands on a detached patch coral reef similarly orientated, with maximum dimensions of 6.6 kilometres (4.1 mi) and 4.4 kilometres (2.7 mi). Its total area is 22.53 km^{2}, of which 11.74 km^{2} comprises the peripheral reef flat, 4.8 km^{2} of the interior lagoon, and only 1.39 km^{2} of the land area of all islets. Depths of 500 m are found only 1.5 km east of the reef edge, and of 1000 m one kilometer further east.

=== Lagoon ===
The surrounding reef completely encloses the lagoon. At low water it drains over a narrow sill, Passe Lerein Fin, at its western end. The lagoon has a maximum depth of 6.4 m. Other soundings range from 2.1 to 3.7 m. In addition to being exceptionally wide, the peripheral reefs are covered (except on the west side) with mobile sand. Inter-tidal sand sheets are encroaching on the margins of the lagoon on its windward side, which is marked for much of its extent by a discontinuous linear sandbar. There are no growing reefs in the lagoon.

=== List of islets ===
The atoll has 13 sandy islets: the three larger ones along the northeast and east shore, which are covered by coconut plantations, and the remaining ones in the south:

	Island	type	Area (hectares)	Location
1	Vars	sand cay	0.21	05°24′22″S 53°19′34″E
2	Ressource	island	12.10	05°24′34″S 53°19′36″E
3	Fouquet Island (ÎIe aux Fouquets)	island	16.70	05°25′23″S 53°20′24″E
4	Pelican Cay (Pélicans)	sand cay	6.00	05°26′10″S 53°20′56″E
5	Saint Joseph Island	island	108.40	05°26′28″S 53°21′35″E
6	Carcassaye Island	sand cay	2.72	05°24′22″S 53°21′23″E
7	Sable Islet	sand cay	0.12	05°26′52″S 53°21′28″E
8	Benjamen Island	sand cay	6.80	05°26′28″S 53°20′47″E
9	Ferrari Island	sand cay	1.02	05°26′47″S 53°20′56″E
10	Chien Island	sand cay	3.25	05°27′00″S 53°20′50″E
11	Paul Island (ÎIe aux Poules)	island	4.58	05°26′44″S 53°20′28″E
12	Banc aux Cocos east	sand cay	0.70	05°26′12″S 53°19′36″E
13	Banc aux Cocos west	sand cay	0.60	05°26′04″S 53°19′21″E
	St. Joseph Atoll	Atoll	163.2	05°26′S 53°21′E

== Administration ==
The island belongs to Outer Islands District.

== Demographics ==
The atoll is currently uninhabited. it hosted a small population of 10, which now moved to D'Arros Island. There are several ruined buildings on the main island of St. Joseph, near the cultivated area at the western end.

== Transport ==
You can reach the atoll with flights to unpaved airstrip (ICAO: FSDA).

== Image gallery ==
Map 1

District Map
