= Amirante Islands =

Archipelago in the Seychelles

Nickname: Ilhas do Almirante
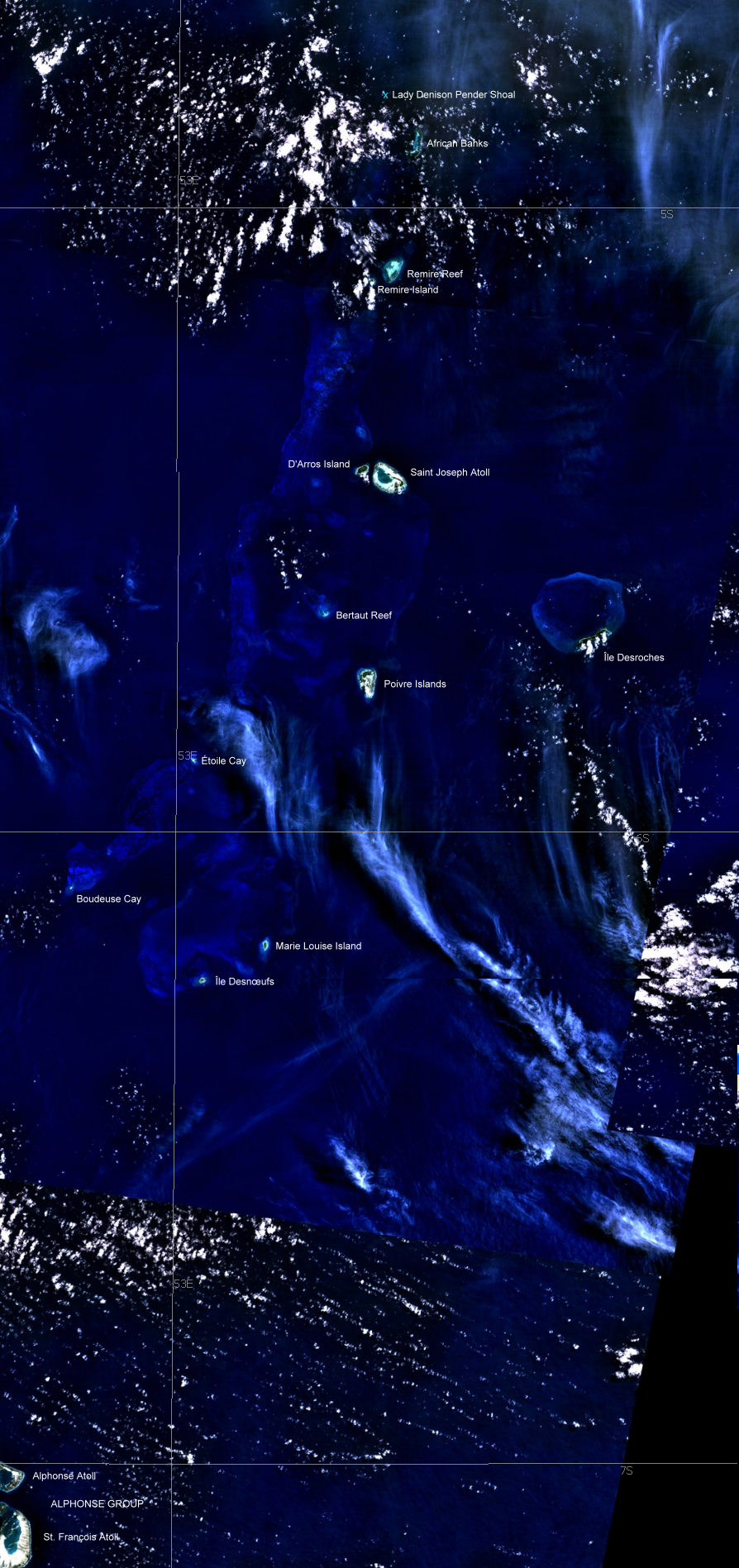
- Satellite Image Map, with neighbouring Alphonse Group in the lower left

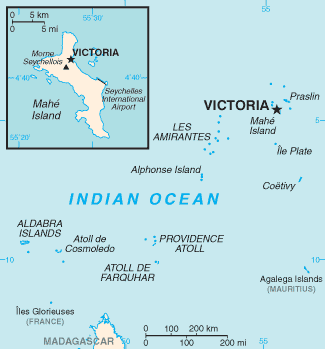
- Map of Seychelles showing the location of Amirante Islands (Les Amirantes)

Geography
- Location: Indian Ocean
- Coordinates: 04°49′S 53°40′E
- Archipelago: Seychelles
- Adjacent to: Indian Ocean
- Total islands: 20
- Major islands: Île Desroches
- Area: 11.5 km^{2} (4.4 sq mi)
- Highest elevation: 15 m (49 ft)

Administration
- Seychelles
- Group: Outer Islands
- Sub-Group: Amirante Islands
- Districts: Outer Islands District
- Largest settlement: Île Desroches (pop. 40)

Demographics
- Population: 300 (2014)
- Pop. density: 26/km^{2} (67/sq mi)
- Ethnic groups: Creole, French, East Africans, Indians.

Additional information
- Time zone: SCT (UTC+4)
- ISO code: SC-26
- Official website: www.seychelles.travel/en/discover/the-islands/outer-islands

The Amirante Islands (Les Amirantes) are a group of coral islands and atolls that belong to the Outer Islands of the Seychelles.

They stretch about 155 km from the African Banks (African Islands) in the north to Desnœufs (Isle des Noeufs) in the south, all on the shallow Amirantes Bank (Amirantes Plateau, with depths of mostly 25 to 70 m), except the main island Île Desroches in the east, and submerged Lady Denison-Pender Shoal at the northern end. 90 km south of the Amirante Islands is Alphonse Group, the closest group of islands, which are sometimes considered part of the Amirantes.

== History ==
The Amirantes were discovered by Vasco da Gama on his second voyage of exploration in 1503, and later named "Ilhas do Almirante" (Admiral Islands). Previous knowledge of the islands by Arab and Indian traders is possible. The islands were claimed by Sieur Michel Blin for France in 1802. By the Treaty of Paris (1814), the islands were passed officially to the British, as a part of Mauritius. In 1909, the Seychelles became a separate colony, thereby including the Amirantes. On 8 November 1965 the United Kingdom split Île Desroches from the Seychelles to become part of the newly created British Indian Ocean Territory. The purpose was to allow the construction of a military base for the mutual benefit of the United Kingdom and the United States. On 23 June 1976 Île Desroches was returned to the Seychelles as a result of the latter attaining independence.

The total land area is 11.5 km^{2}. The total population is 300. The biggest concentrations are the Prison 2 km from Marie Louise village and the Collins group construction camp which is 2 km from the capital village of Desroches village (which had a population of 35 in the last census).

== Islands ==
There are eight single islands (five low sand cays and three uplifted sand cays), plus three atolls with a total of 18 islets (St. Joseph Atoll with 14, Desroches with 1, Poivre Atoll with 3). In addition to these 11 units, the following table also has entries for a reef and a shoal without islets, for the sake of completeness. The five largest ones in area are inhabited. The different island types are marked by different background colours in the table.

	Island/Atoll/Reef (alternate name)	type	Area (km^{2})	Pop. est.	Location
1	Lady Denison-Pender	submerged shoal	-	-	04°49′S 53°20′E
2	African Banks (African Islands)	sand cay	0.04	-	04°53′S 53°24′E
3	Remire Reef	drying reef	-	-	05°05′S 53°21′E
4	Remire (Eagle)	uplifted sand cay	0.27	6	05°07′S 53°19′E
5	D'Arros	sand cay	1.71	42	05°24.5′S 53°18′E
6	St. Joseph	atoll	1.63	0	05°25′S 53°20′E
7	Bertaut	sand cay	0.002	-	05°39′06″S 53°14′18″E
8	Desroches	atoll	4.02	100	05°41′S 53°41′E
9	Poivre	atoll	2.78	10	05°46′S 53°19′E
10	Étoile	sand cay	0.05	-	05°53′S 53°01′E
11	Boudeuse	sand cay	0.03	-	06°05′31″S 52°49′50″E
12	Marie Louise	uplifted sand cay	0.556	150	06°11′S 53°08′E
13	Desnœufs (Île des Noeufs)	uplifted sand cay	0.45	-	06°14′S 53°03′E
	Amirante Islands	island chain	11.5	300	04°49' to 06°14'S, 52°50° to 53°41'E

=== Alphonse Group ===
90 km south of the Amirante Islands is Alphonse Group, the closest group of islands, which are sometimes considered part of the Amirantes chain because they are a southern continuation or extension of the Amirantes chain. Alphonse Group lies south of the Amirantes Bank, separated from it by deep water (generally 1000 to 2000 metres deep).

== Image gallery ==
Map 1

District map of the Outer Islands

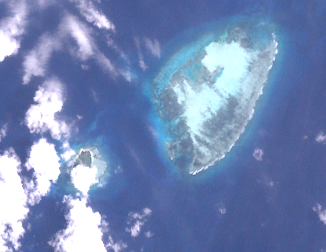
Remire (Eagle) Island and Remire Reef (NASA Satellite Image)

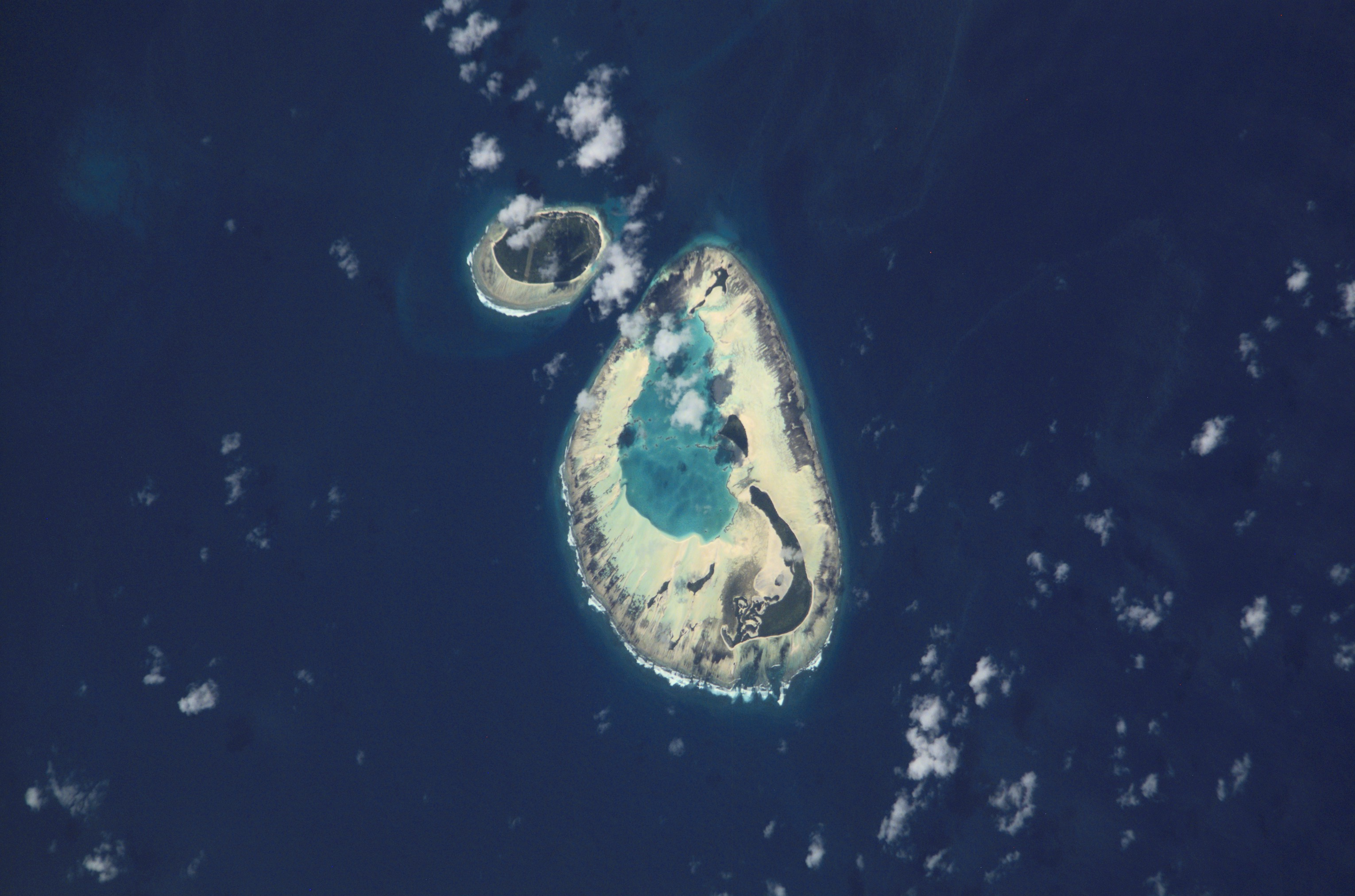
NASA astronaut image of St. Joseph Atoll and D'Arros Island.

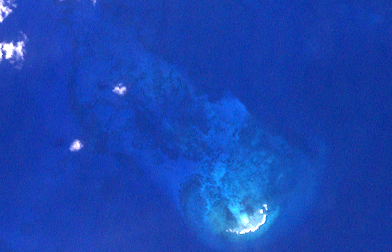
Bertaut Reef (NASA Image)

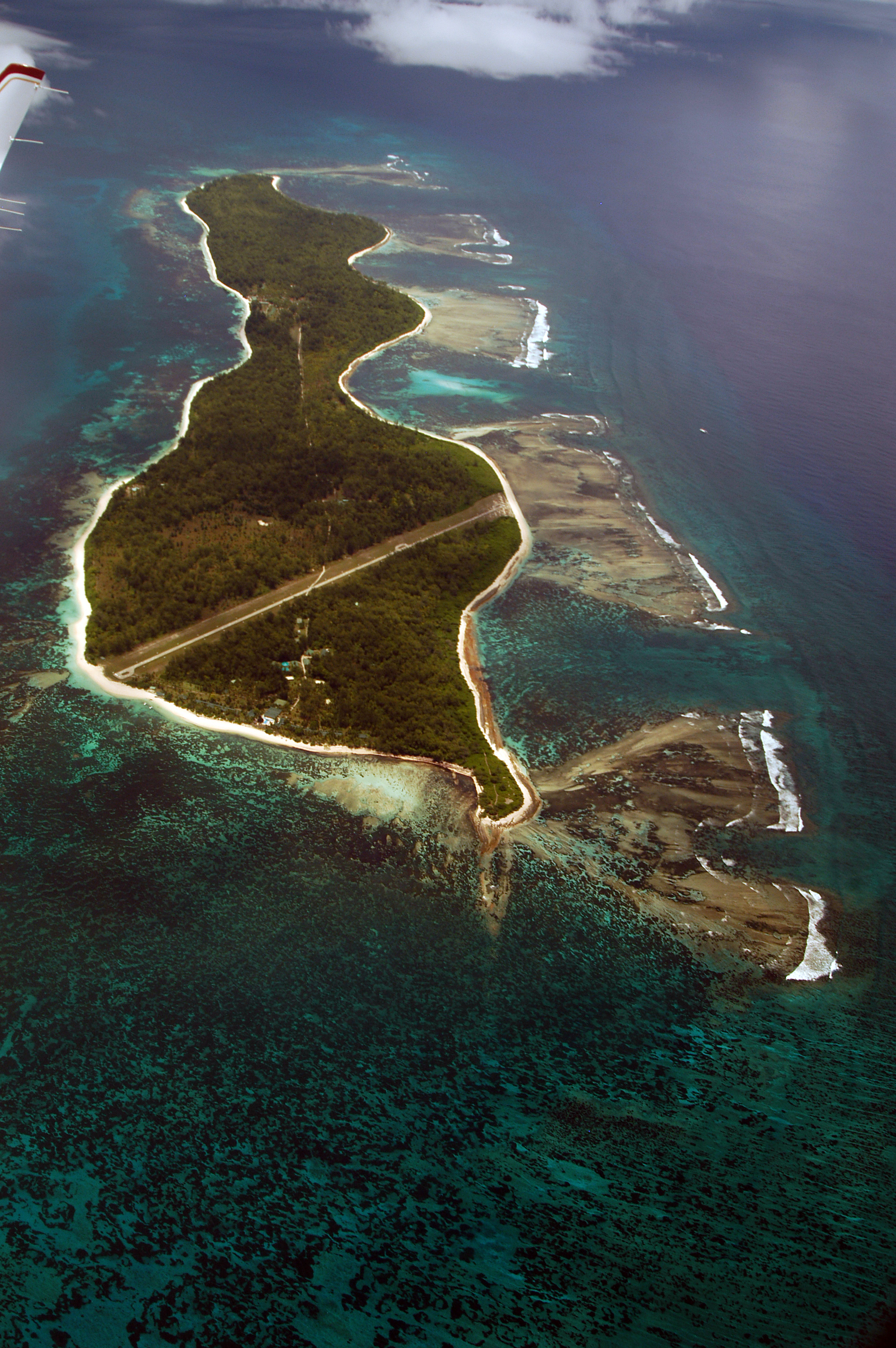
Desroches Island
from the southwest

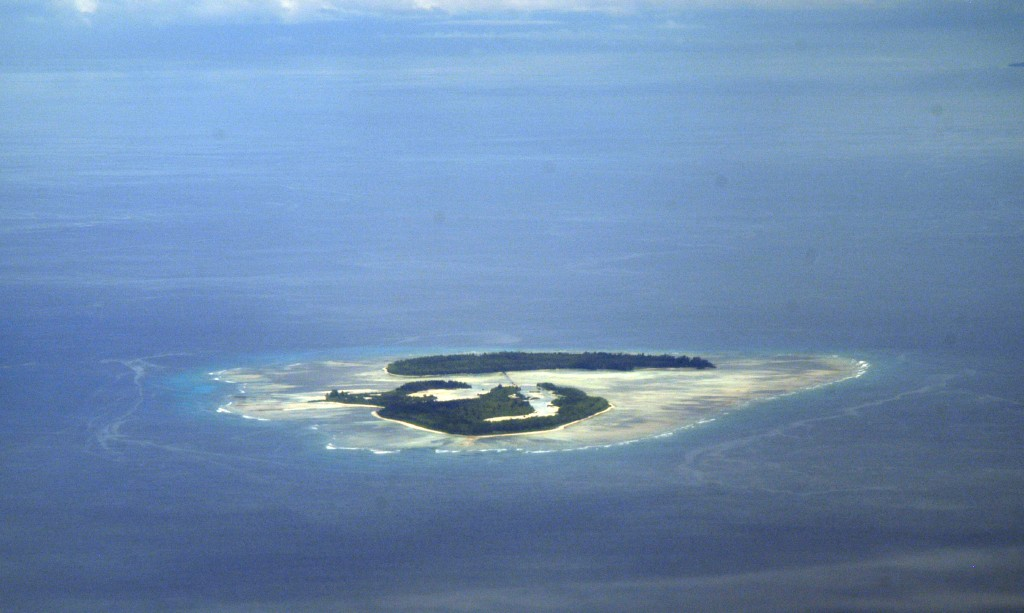
Poivre Atoll from the south

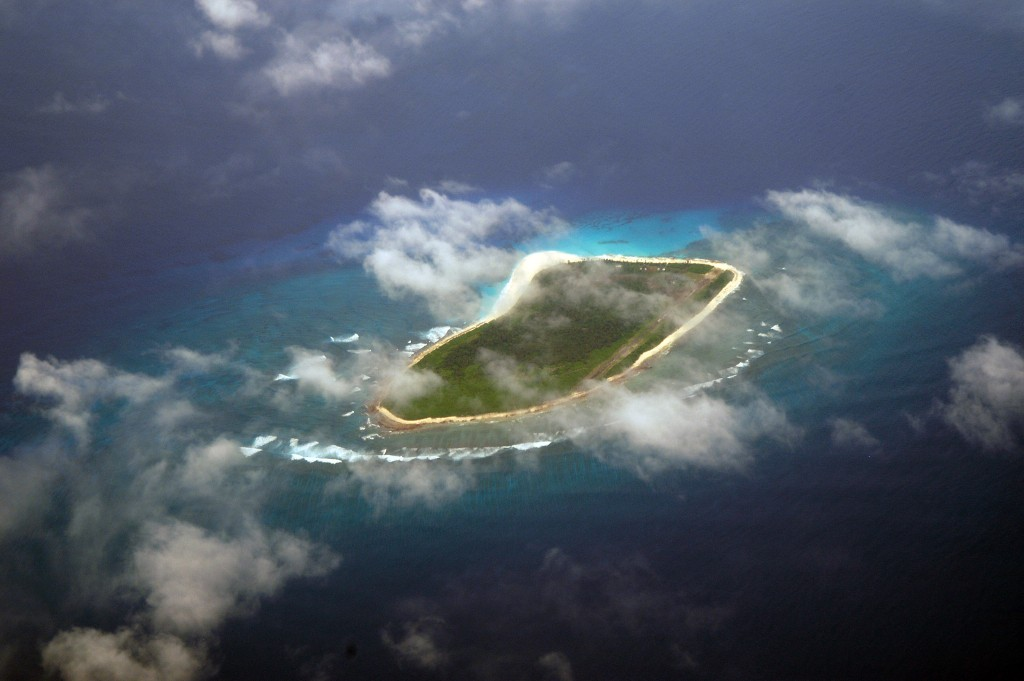
Marie Louise Island

== See also ==
- Geography of Seychelles
