= Alphonse Group =

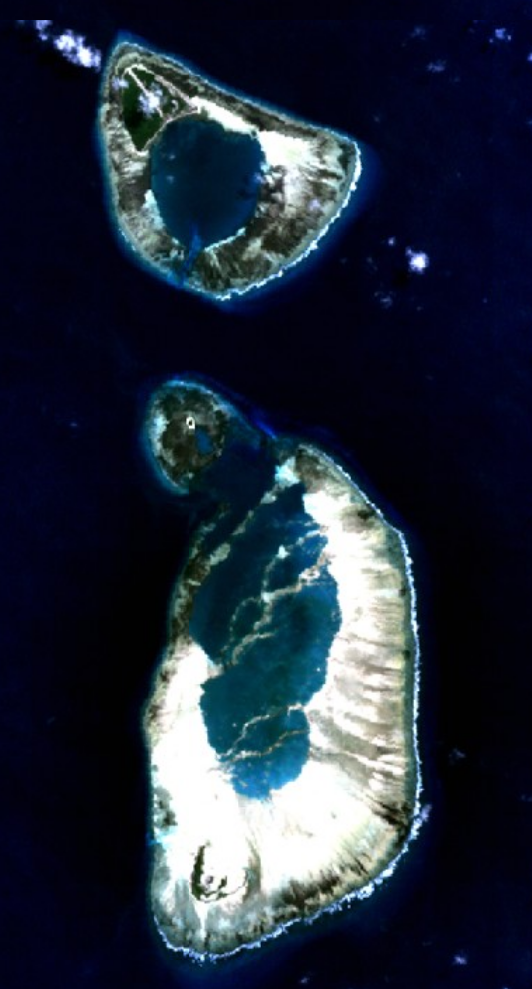
- Satellite image of Alphonse Group: Alphonse Atoll (top) and St. François Atoll (bottom)

- Location within Seychelles

Geography
- Location: Indian Ocean
- Coordinates: 7°05′S 52°44′E
- Archipelago: Seychelles
- Total islands: 3
- Major islands: Alphonse Island
- Area: 2.211 km^{2} (0.854 sq mi)

Administration
- Seychelles

Demographics
- Population: 82
- Pop. density: 37/km^{2} (96/sq mi)

Location of the Alphonse Group in the Indian Ocean

The Alphonse Group belong to the Outer Islands of the Seychelles, lying in the southwest of the island nation, 403 kilometres (250 miles) southwest the capital, Victoria, on Mahé Island. The closest island is Desnœufs Island of the Amirante Islands, 87 km (54 mi) further north.

== Islands in the Alphonse Group ==
The Alphonse Group consists of two atolls that are only two kilometres (1.2 miles) apart, separated by a deep channel:

1. Alphonse Atoll in the north, with only one island, Alphonse Island
2. St. François Atoll in the south, with the islands St. François and Bijoutier

Only Alphonse Island is inhabited. The aggregate land area of all three islets in both atolls is less than 2.21 km^{2} (1 sq mi), but the total area including reefs and lagoons amounts to roughly 65 km^{2} (25 sq mi).
