= St. François Atoll =

Atoll in the Seychelles

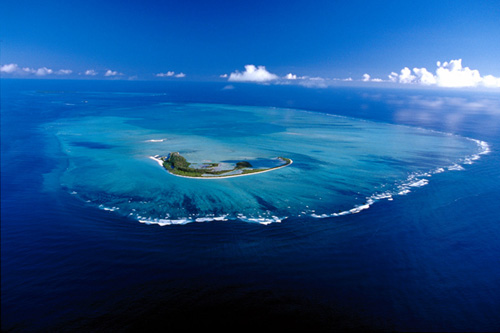
- St. François Atoll from south, with St. François Island in the foreground

- Location within Seychelles

Geography
- Location: Indian Ocean
- Coordinates: 07°04′S 52°44′E
- Archipelago: Seychelles
- Adjacent to: Indian Ocean
- Total islands: 2
- Major islands: St. François; Bijoutier
- Area: 0.5 km^{2} (0.19 sq mi)
- Coastline: 9.5 km (5.9 mi)
- Highest elevation: 0 m (0 ft)

Administration
- Seychelles
- Group: Outer Islands
- Sub-Group: Alphonse Group
- Districts: Outer Islands District
- Largest settlement: St. François Island (pop. 0)

Demographics
- Population: 0 (2014)
- Pop. density: 0/km^{2} (0/sq mi)
- Ethnic groups: Creole, French, East Africans, Indians.

Additional information
- Time zone: SCT (UTC+4)
- ISO code: SC-26
- Official website: www.seychelles.travel/en/discover/the-islands/outer-islands

St. François Atoll is one of two atolls of the Alphonse Group in the Seychelles that are part of the Outer Islands.

== Geography ==
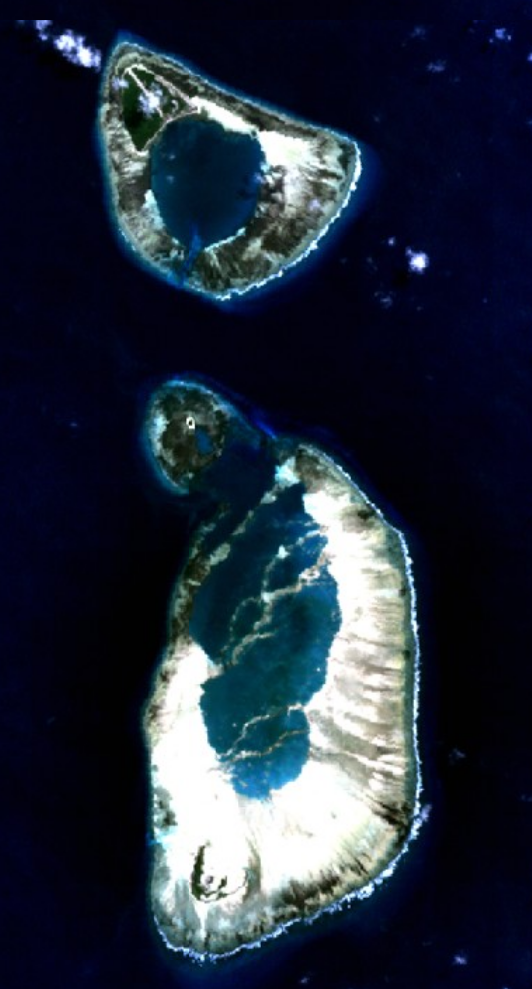
Satellite image of Alphonse Group (St. François Atoll in the south)

St. François Atoll lies 403 km south of Victoria, Seychelles. It is located just two kilometres (1.2 miles) south of Alphonse Atoll, the second atoll of Alphonse Group, separated from it by a deep channel called Canal de Mort. The atoll is uninhabited and has two islands, St. François and Bijoutier Island.

The aggregate land area of the islands of the atoll is 0.5 square kilometres (0.19 square miles). The total area of the atoll, with length of 10.5 kilometres (7 miles) and width of 5.0 kilometres (3 miles), is 53 square kilometres (20 square miles), including reef flat and lagoon.

=== St. François Island ===
The area of the island is 0.47 square kilometres (0.18 square miles). St. Francois is easily accessible at less than 30 minutes distance by boat from Alphonse. It has a coastline of 10.0 kilometres (6 miles), and is located 9.0 kilometres (6 miles) south of Bijoutier Island.

=== Bijoutier Island ===
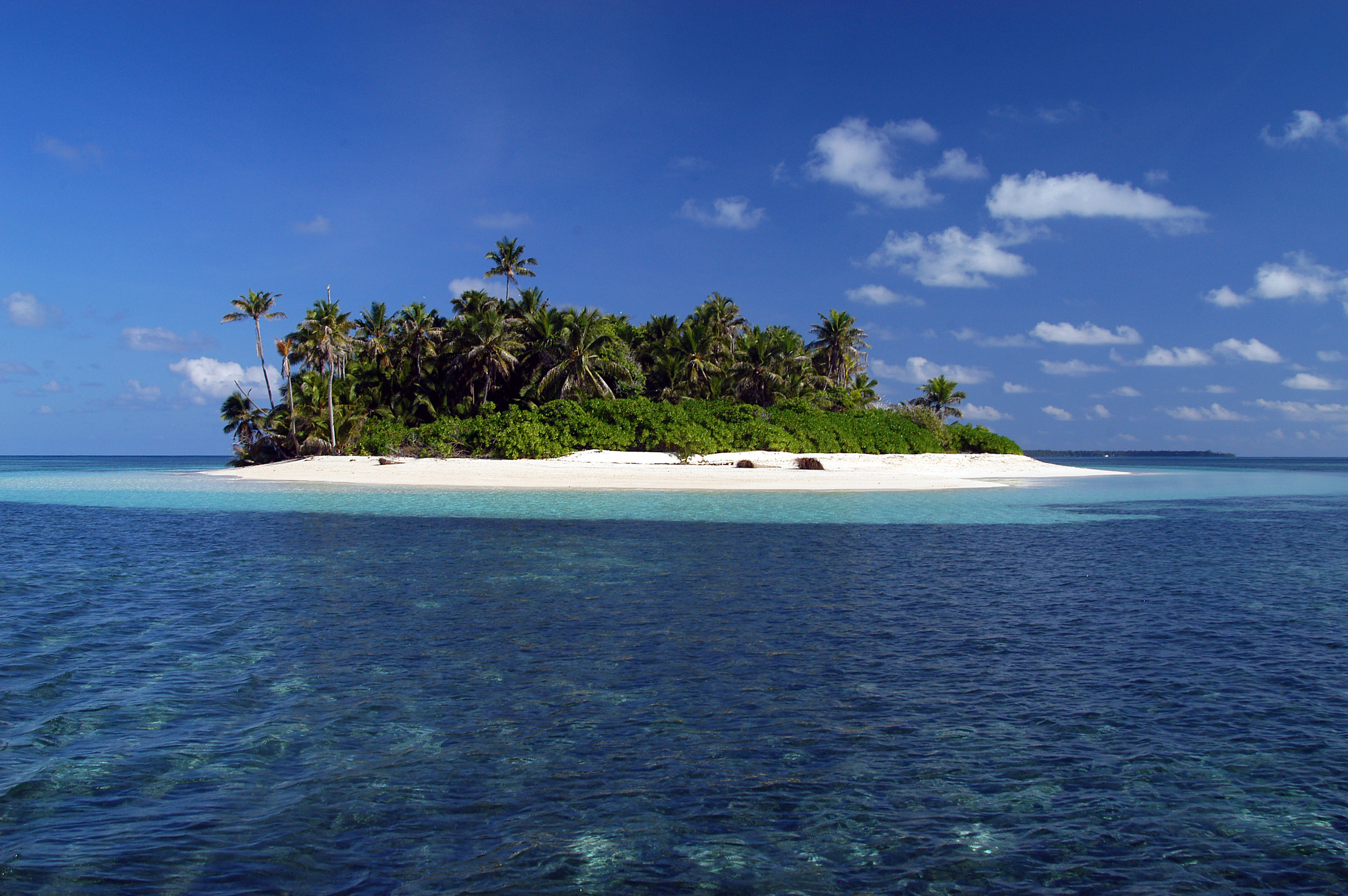
Bijoutier Island

The northern and smaller island takes its name from the French word bijoutier, meaning "jeweller". The area of the island is 0.03 square kilometres (0.01 square miles). The island is only accessible by boat during high tide. The island is small enough that it takes only a few minutes to walk completely around it. It has a coastline of 0.7 kilometres (0 miles).

== History ==
In 1562 the whole of the Alphonse Group (Alphonse, St. François and Bijoutier) were collectively named on Portuguese charts as San Francisco. This might explain how St. François was given its name. Chevalier Alphonse de Pontevez commanding the French frigate Le Lys visited on 28 June 1730 and named St François possibly following the Portuguese name for the group. Some sources (giving the incorrect date for the visit) claim it was to commemorate the religious feast of St Francis de Sales of 29 January. The origin of the name of Bijoutier island is unknown. A feature of St. François Atoll is the number of shipwrecks, standing as grim reminders of the perils of the sea. St. François island once supported a population of a handful of men engaged in harvesting coconuts but the plantation was never productive.

== Flora and fauna ==
In 2007, Island Conservation Society established a conservation center on Alphonse to manage conservation on the island and on neighboring St. François.

There is a small breeding population of 13 pairs of black-naped tern. A small colony of tropical shearwater was rediscovered in 2013, the first confirmed breeding record since the 1950s. Migratory bird numbers are huge and include globally significant numbers of crab plover and Saunders's tern. Seychelles’ largest concentrations of Eurasian whimbrel, ruddy turnstone and grey plover have also been recorded here. The only land bird is the house sparrow and this is its most southerly outpost in Seychelles. Significant numbers of hawksbill turtles and green turtles nest on St François and Bijoutier, and the waters of the atoll provide important foraging habitat for immature turtles of both species.

== Transport ==
The islands can be reached by boat from Alphonse.

== Image gallery ==
Map 1

District map of the Outer Islands
