= Marie Louise Island Airport =

- IATA: none; ICAO: FSMA

Summary
- Airport type: Private
- Operator: Islands Development Corporation (IDC)
- Location: Marie Louise Island, Seychelles
- Elevation AMSL: 10 ft / 3 m
- Coordinates: 06°10′40″S 53°08′45″E

Map
- Location of the airport in Seychelles

Runways
Direction	Length		Surface
Direction	m	ft	Surface
17/35	770	2,526	Concrete
- Sources: GCM Google Maps

Marie Louise Island Airport (ICAO: FSMA) is an airstrip serving Marie Louise Island in the Seychelles. The runway is along the eastern shore of the island.

Marie Louise Island is 308 kilometres (191 mi) southwest of Victoria, the capital of the Seychelles.

== See also ==
- Transport in Seychelles
- List of airports in Seychelles
