= Plouénan =

Plouénan Plouenan
- Commune
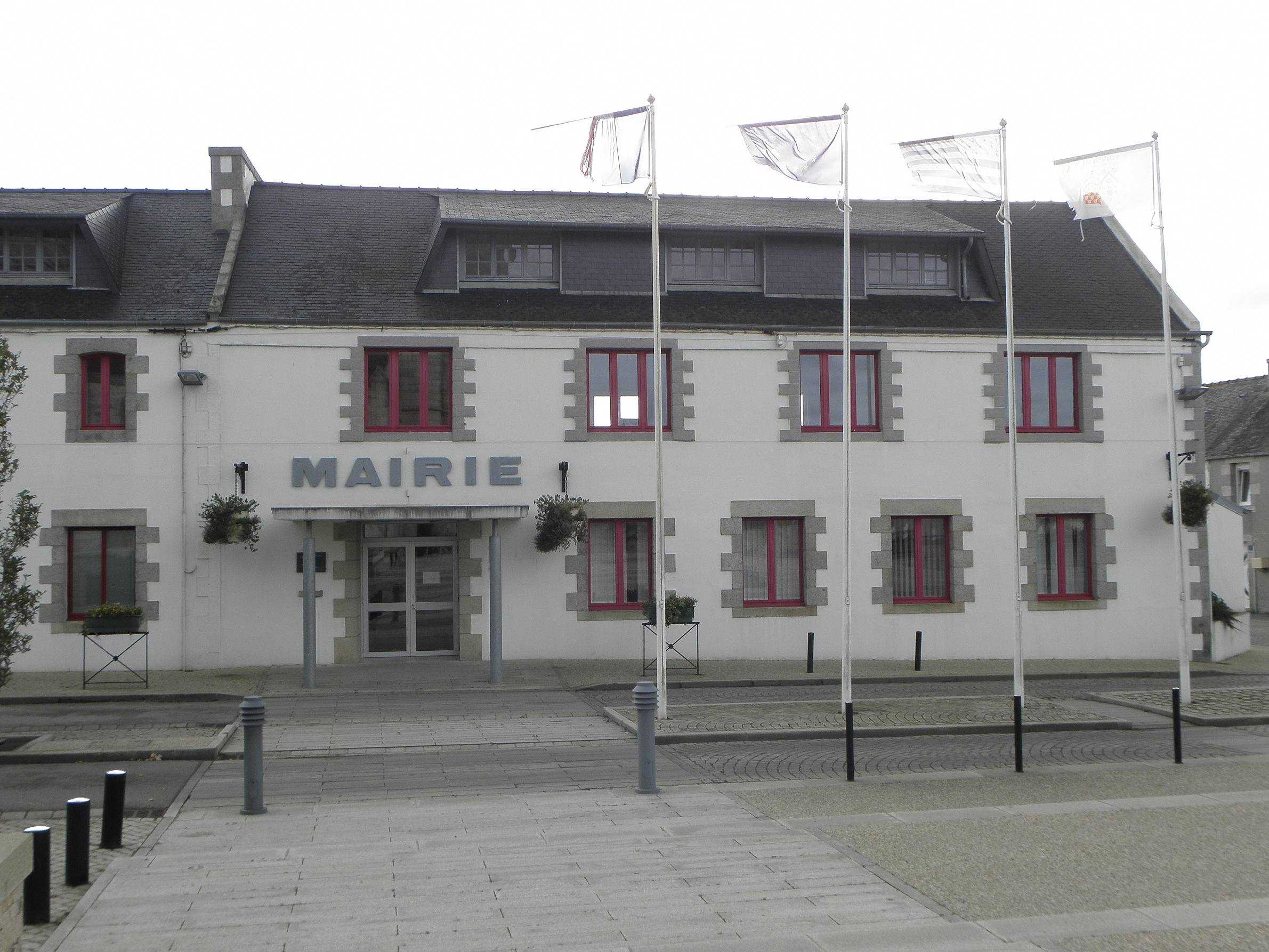
- The town hall in Plouénan
- Location of Plouénan
- Location within France Location within Brittany
- Coordinates: 48°37′44″N 3°59′17″W
- Country: France
- Region: Brittany
- Department: Finistère
- Arrondissement: Morlaix
- Canton: Saint-Pol-de-Léon

Government
  - Mayor (2020–2026): Aline Chevaucher
- Area^{1}: 30.64 km^{2} (11.83 sq mi)
- Highest elevation: 88 m (289 ft)
- Lowest elevation: 0 m (0 ft)
- Population (2023): 2,610
  - Density: 85.2/km^{2} (221/sq mi)
- Time zone: UTC+01:00 (CET)
  - Summer (DST): UTC+02:00 (CEST)
- INSEE/Postal code: 29184 /29420
- ^{1} French Land Register data, which excludes lakes, ponds, glaciers > 1 km^{2} (0.386 sq mi or 247 acres) and river estuaries.

Plouénan (French pronunciation: [pluenɑ̃]; Breton: Plouenan) is both a commune in the Finistère department of Brittany in north-western France and also a town within the commune.

The commune includes the town of Plouénan and the hamlets of Kerlaudy, Pont-Éon, and Lopreden. It forms part of the Pays de Léon area.

== Toponymy ==
The name of the area has appeared in a number of forms including Plebs Lapidea in 884, Plebs Menoen around 1150, Ploebenon in 1277, Plouenouven in 1279, Plebenoen in 1306, Ploe Benoan around 1330, Plebevenan in 1405, Ploebenan in 1467, Ploemenan in 1453, and Ploemenan in 1481.

Plouénan comes from the Breton language word "ploe" meaning parish et Menoen, who was a Breton saint.

== Education ==
The town of Plouénan has two primary schools - one public and one private.

L’école Simone Veil is the public school. The school was founded in 1816 and was, at the time, only open to boys. The school moved to its current site in 1906. In 1946, a parents' association (L'Amicale Laïque) was formed to raise funds for the school and children. At various points during the year, it holds events including the annual kermesse. In 2017, the school, then known simply as L'école Publique du Bourg, was renamed in honour of Simone Veil - the renaming ceremony took place on 24 June 2017. In 2017/2018, the school welcomed 109 children. The school was in the first wave of schools to return to a four-day week pattern (with the school remaining closed on Wednesdays).

L’école Notre Dame de Kérellon is a private school aligned to the Catholic church. In 2015/2016, the school had 131 children.

== Population ==
Historical population
Year	Pop.	±% p.a.
1968	2,642	—
1975	2,581	−0.33%
1982	2,510	−0.40%
1990	2,356	−0.79%
1999	2,381	+0.12%
2007	2,417	+0.19%
2012	2,484	+0.55%
2017	2,510	+0.21%
2023	2,610	+0.65%
Source: INSEE

Inhabitants of Plouénan are called in French Plouénanais.

== See also ==
- Communes of the Finistère department
