= Desroches Island =

Main island of the Amirante Islands, Seychelles

Nickname: Île des Roches
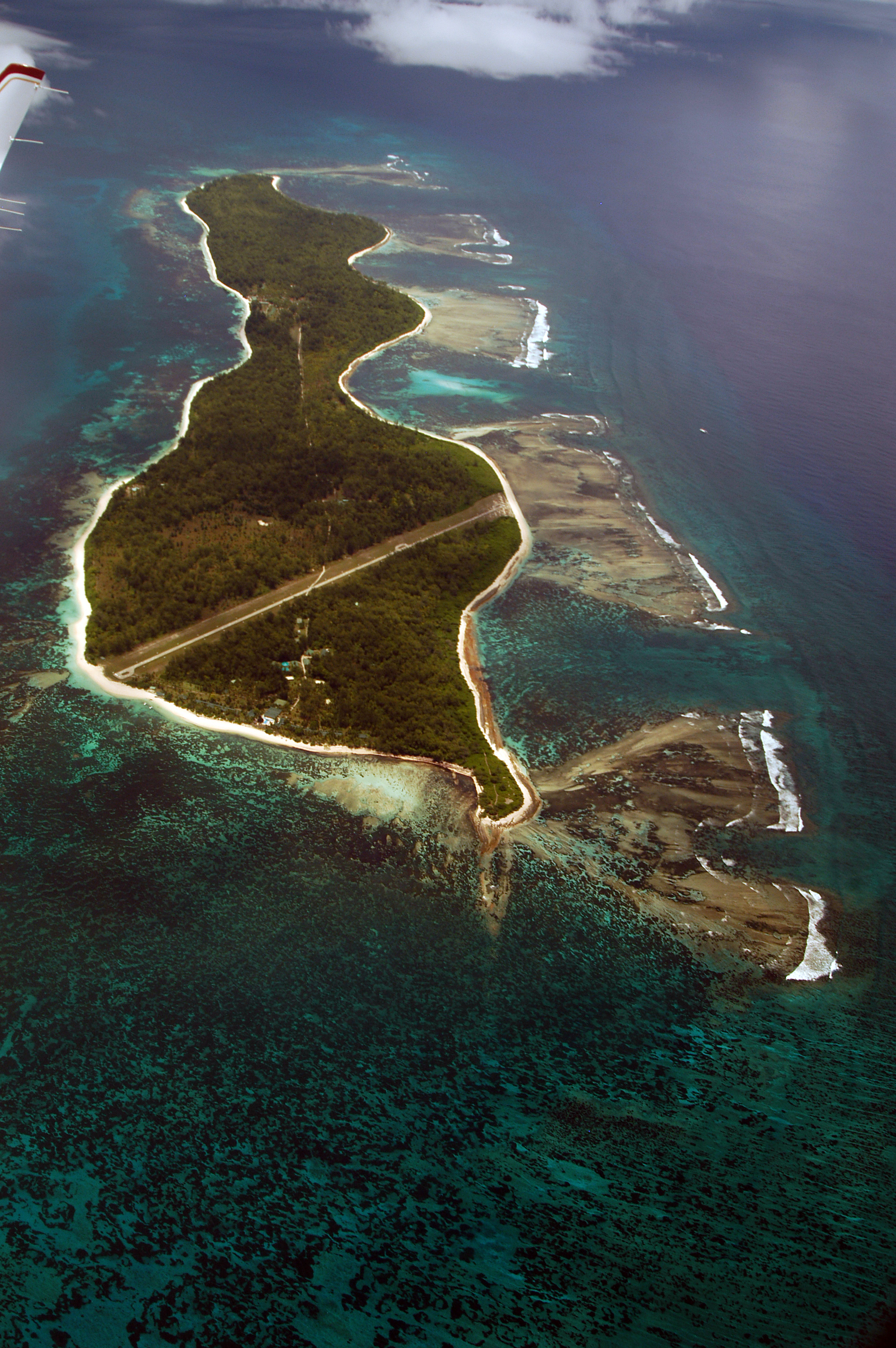

- Location within Seychelles

Geography
- Location: Indian Ocean
- Coordinates: 05°40′S 53°39′E
- Archipelago: Seychelles
- Adjacent to: Indian Ocean
- Total islands: 1
- Major islands: Desroches
- Area: 4.027 km^{2} (1.555 sq mi)
- Length: 5.5 km (3.42 mi)
- Width: 1.0 km (0.62 mi)
- Coastline: 13.1 km (8.14 mi)
- Highest elevation: 13 m (43 ft)

Administration
- Seychelles
- Group: Outer Islands
- Sub-Group: Amirante Islands
- Districts: Outer Islands District
- Largest settlement: Desroches (pop. 40)

Demographics
- Population: 100 (2014)
- Pop. density: 24.8/km^{2} (64.2/sq mi)
- Ethnic groups: Creole, French, East Africans, Indians.

Additional information
- Time zone: SCT (UTC+4)
- ISO code: SC-26
- Official website: www.seychelles.travel/en/discover/the-islands/outer-islands

Desroches Island or Île Desroches is the main island of the Amirante Islands, part of the Outer Islands of the Seychelles.

It is located 227 km southwest of the national capital Victoria. It is 5.5 km long, with 4.027 km^{2} surface area. Along its circumference of 13 km is a beach of fine sand. Conservation on the island is managed by Island Conservation Society.

== History ==
The island was named Île des Roches in 1771 by La Biolière, captain of the French ship Étoile du Matin, in honour of François Julien des Roches, Governor of Île de France (now Mauritius) and Île Bourbon (now Réunion) from 1767 to 1772. It was explored by the Chevalier de la Billioère in 1771. The British had originally named it Wood Island because of its dense tree vegetation. The island was an important producer of copra. in 1835 the first settlement was established Along with the remaining Amirante Islands, Desroches had been a part of the Seychelles since it became a separate colony in 1909. On 8 November 1965 the United Kingdom split Desroches from the Seychelles to become part of the newly created British Indian Ocean Territory together with Farquhar, Aldabra and the Chagos Archipelago, but returned it to the Seychelles with the first two. The purpose was to allow the construction of a military base for the mutual benefit of the United Kingdom and the United States. On 23 June 1976 Desroches was returned to Seychelles as a result of it attaining independence. In 1972, a tourist lodge was built on the island, on Lodge Beach. In 1988, the Lodge changed hands to MK resorts which renovated it to a Luxury resort with 20 rooms. In 2005, the resort was sold to Collins Properties which renovated it and added a spa. In 2009 the Island Conservation Society opened a Conservation Centre at Desroches. Turtle monitoring, Aldabra Giant Tortoise relocation, bird monitoring and island rehabilitation projects were implemented and an endowment fund established to provide funds to protect the environment.

The LUX managed resort was expanded to 60 rooms in 2008, and in 2016 the resort was sold to Four Seasons hotels. Four Seasons added more rooms in Lodge beach, while the Madame Zabre Beach units were sold as residential buildings.

== Geography ==
It is located 36 km (22 mi) east of the Amirantes Bank, and separated from it by water over 1,300 metres (4,265 ft) deep. It lies on the southern edge of a reef of atoll character. At the northern edge of the atoll are the Shark Rocks, with least depths between 3 and 6 m (10 and 20 ft). The island is fringed by a drying reef which extends 1.6 km (1.0 mi) offshore from the northeastern extremity and 0.8 km (0.5 mi) from the southwestern extremity. A deep channel, about 1.6 km (1.0 mi) wide, leads into the lagoon. The least depth in the channel is 18.3 m (60 ft), and it crosses the atoll in a position about 11 km (7 mi) northwest of Desroches. Sand naturally moves from the south west end of the island to the north east. Satellite images reveal that between 2008 and 2023 (latest image available) around 2600m^{2} of new vegetation have been added at North Point. The photos below show the northeast tip of the island, where beach-building naturally takes place. In contrast to the surrounding area, the vegetation here is almost exclusively native.

The warmest months are typically between January and May with the average temperature between 28 and 29 degrees Celsius. While this only drops to 26 to 28 degrees for the rest of the year, strong south-east winds during June-November make this period feel cooler. December-February are the wettest months, receiving on average around 200mm of rain/month. June-September is in contrast much drier, which average rainfall around 50mm/month.

== Demographics ==
Desroches has a population of about 300, with every inhabitant working on the island. Seychellois and Indians make up the majority of the population, with the origin of other inhabitants spread from around the world. No children live on the island.

== Administration ==
The island belongs to Outer Islands District. Being an island with a small population, there are not any government buildings or services. For many services, people have to go to Victoria, which is a difficult task. Desroches is a registered voting station, with people on the other Amirante Islands able to travel here to vote.

== Transport ==
The island is bisected by a 1,372-metre (4,501 ft) long paved airstrip in the southern part (IATA code DES, ICAO code FSDA). The island has regular service aircraft from Mahé which comes at least 4 times per week, and a few times a day during the peak tourist season. A supply barge comes roughly twice per month from Mahé, which brings most of the supplies the inhabitants rely on.

== Economics ==
The inhabitants of the island engage mainly in tourism. Small scale farming and fishing are mainly for local consumption. Coconuts are still collected and then sold on Mahé.

== Flora and fauna ==
In 2009, the Island Conservation Society opened a conservation center on the island, employing between three and four full-time staff. There is one endemic land bird, the Malagasy turtle dove, which re-colonised the island in 2019 and the population has been increasing ever since. All other land birds are introduced species. All over the island healthy populations of house sparrows, zebra doves, Madagascar fodies and grey francolin can be found. The island is low and the vegetation has been heavily influenced by the island's use as a plantation. Coconut palms and tall hardwood trees (of the species Casuarina equisetifolia) are dominant. There are though areas of regenerating natural woodland. Native wooded vegetation is comprised mainly of Guettarda speciosa, Morinda citrifolia, Cordia subcordata, Pipturus argenteus and Hernandia nymphaeifolia. In total over 150 plant species have been recorded on Desroches, of which around 2/3rds are estimated to have been introduced.

The long, encircling beach and beach-crest of Desroches are of national importance for both green turtle and hawksbill turtle, particularly on the south and northeast coasts. An estimated 79 Green sea turtles nest each year on Desroches, a number which has doubled since 2009. As elsewhere in many of locations in Seychelles, the population of the Hawksbill sea turtle is declining, with 26 estimated to nest annually (compared to 46 in 2009).

Wedge-tailed shearwaters are one of three species of seabird that breed on the island (and the most numerous). The main colony is in the south west end of the island. This was largely destroyed by hotel construction in 2016, however in 2026 returned for the first time to a population size (2,719) similar to that of 2015. Breeding success ranges between 40 and 77%. Two more smaller colonies are also present at Bombay beach and at the north east end of the island.

Blue-billed white terns have recently re-colonised the island and it is estimated that there are around 300 breeding pairs.

White-tailed tropicbirds also occasionally breed, but likely struggle due to the presence of rats and cats.

It is doubtful that Aldabra giant tortoises were on Desroches before human inhabitation. Around 10-20 tortoises are thought to have been brought to Desroches between 1965 and 1975, another 10 during the 1980s. 29 tortoises were recorded to roam free on the island when ICS opened its Conservation Center on the island in 2009. Now, an estimated 180 Aldabra giant tortoises are wild on the island. Around juveniles are protected from rats and cats in a sanctuary run by the Island Conservation Society. They are released to the wild when they weigh 9kg.

Desroches is often quoted to have an endemic species of cockroach, Delosia ornata. However, a 1997 article published in Oriental Insects notes that the species has also been reported from Sri Lanka. In total, over 150 species of insects have been recorded on Desroches.

== Image gallery ==
Map 1

District Map

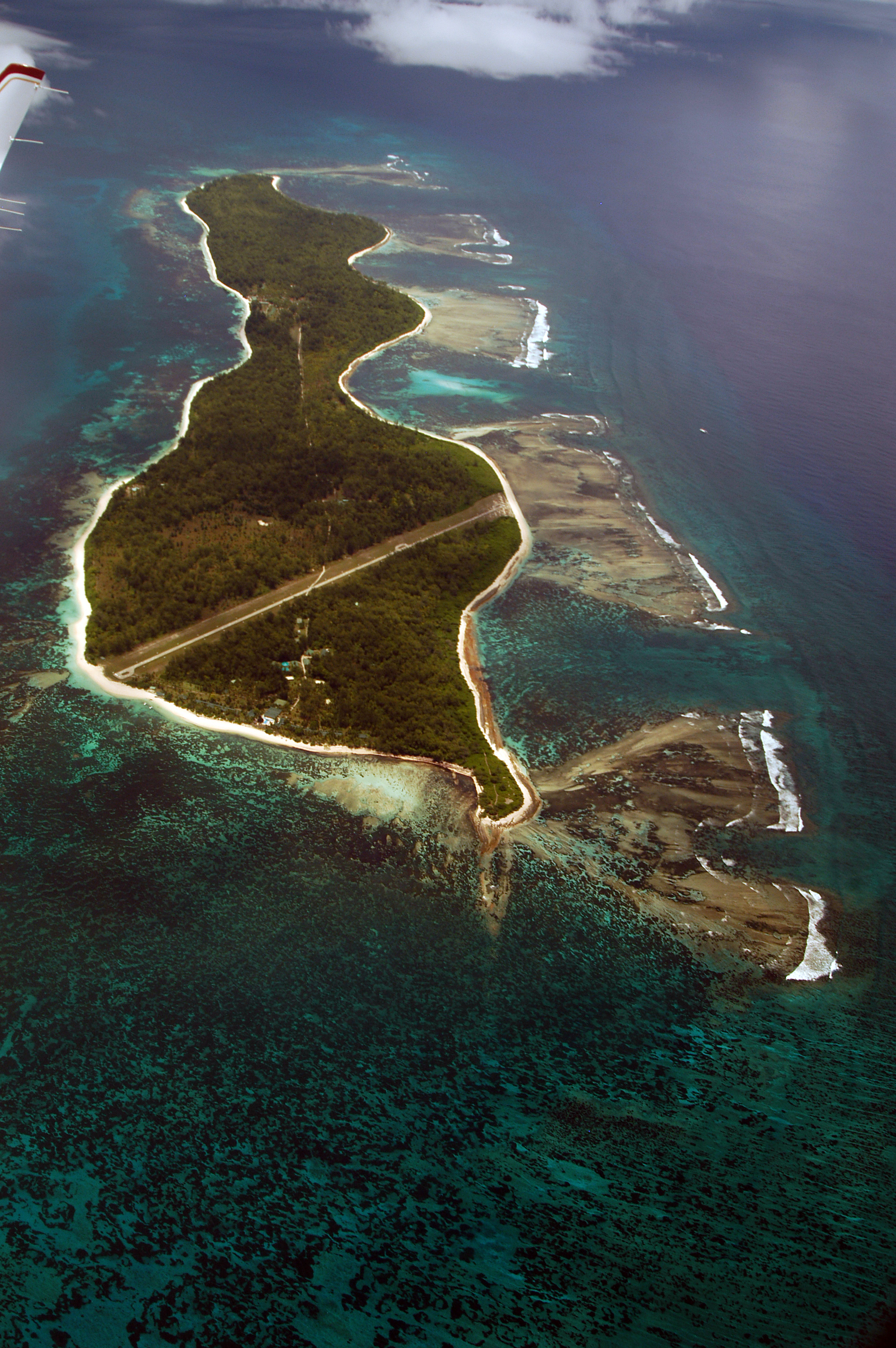
Desroches Island
from the southwest

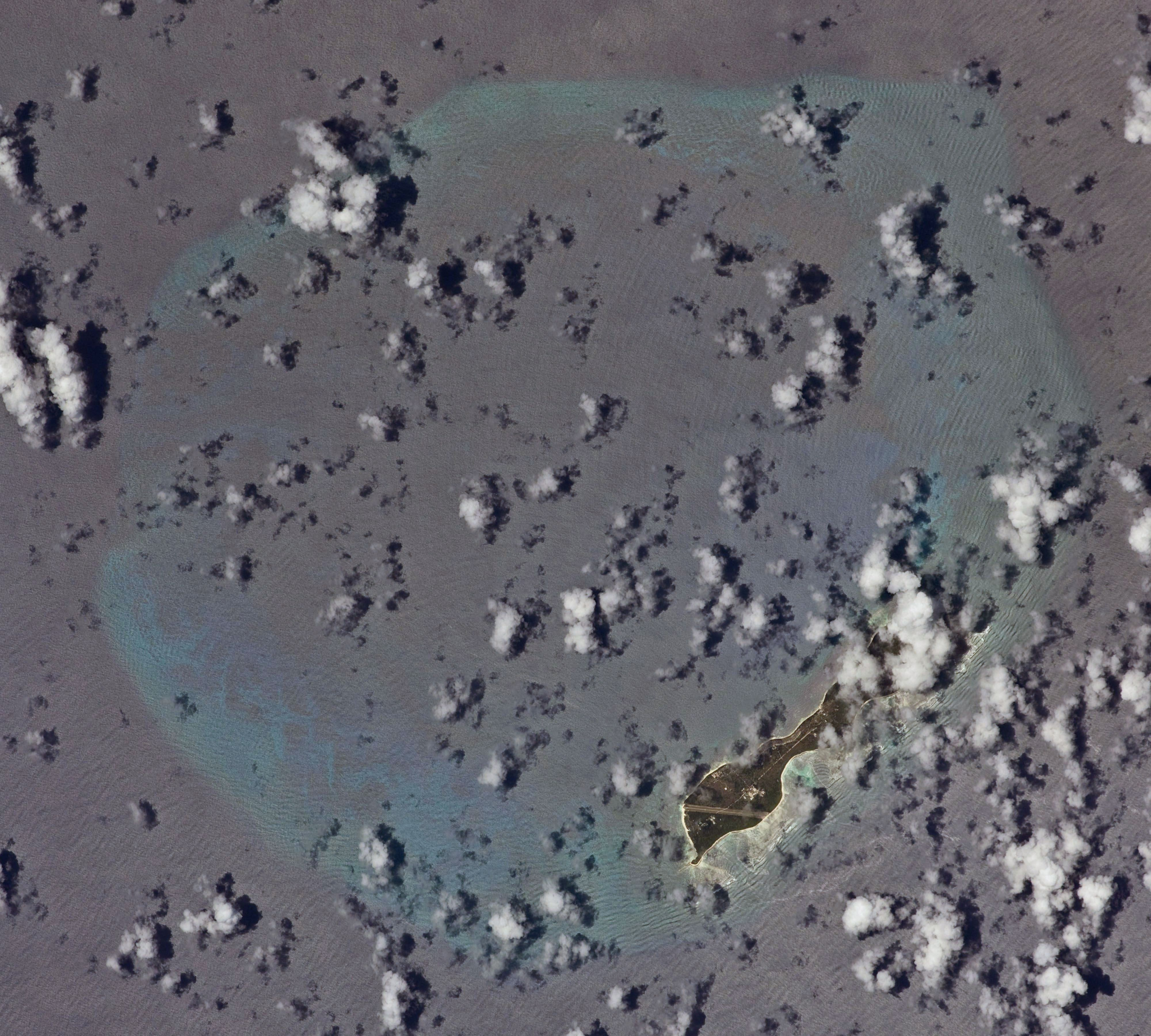
Sat image

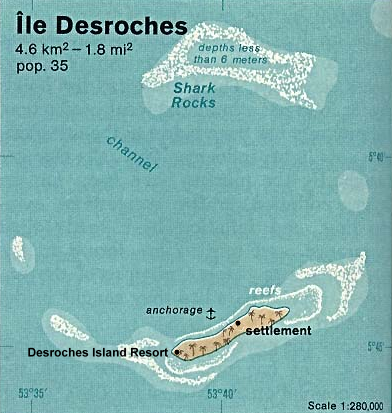
1976 map

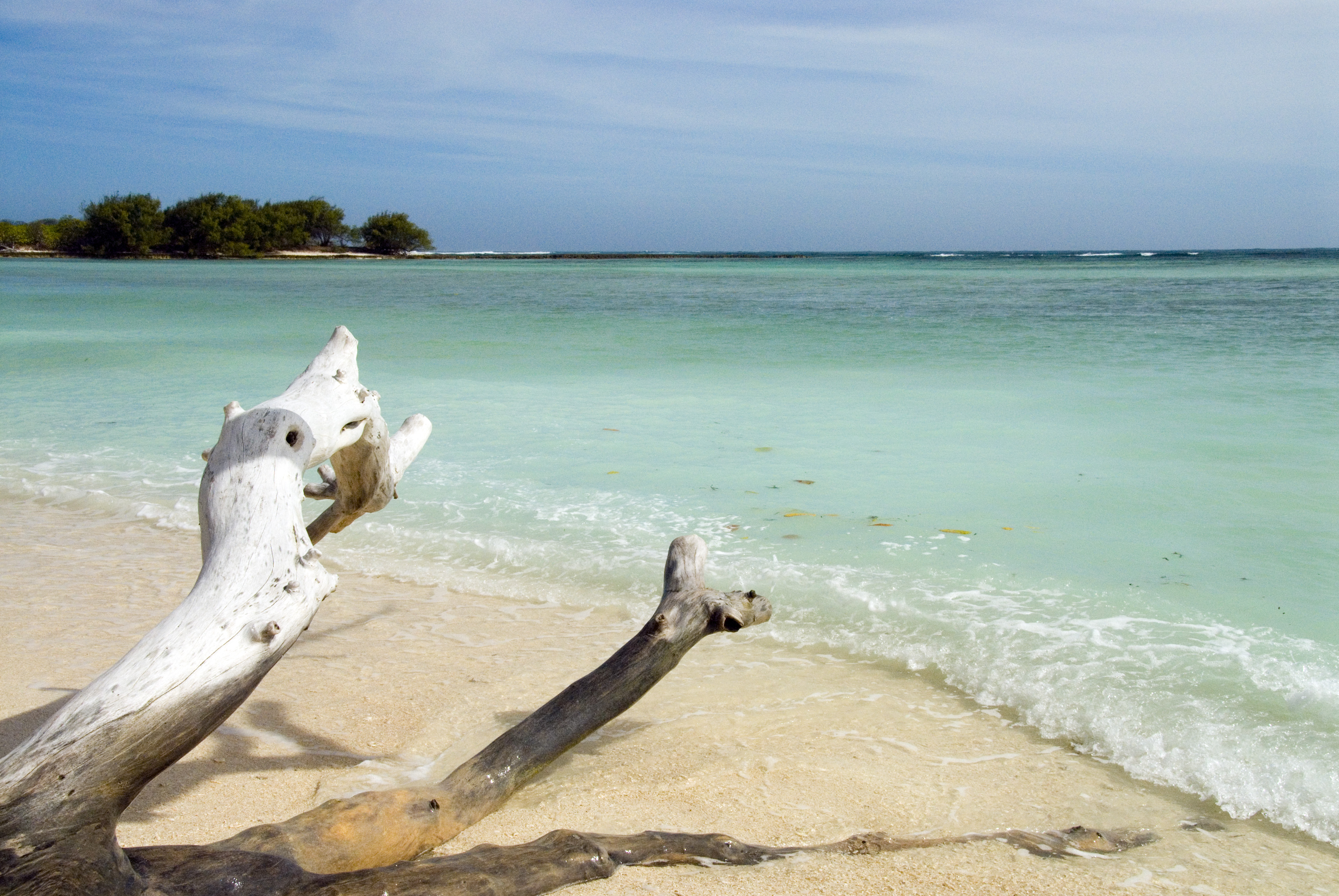
A beach on the western side of the island

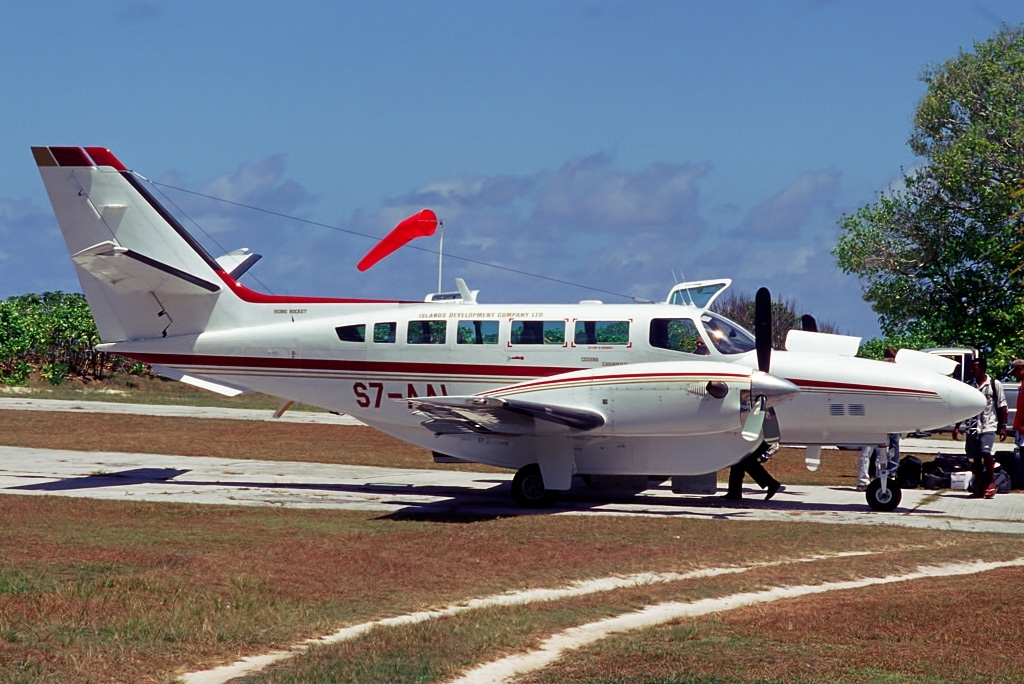
Cessna airplane on the island
