= D'Arros Island =

Island in Seychelles

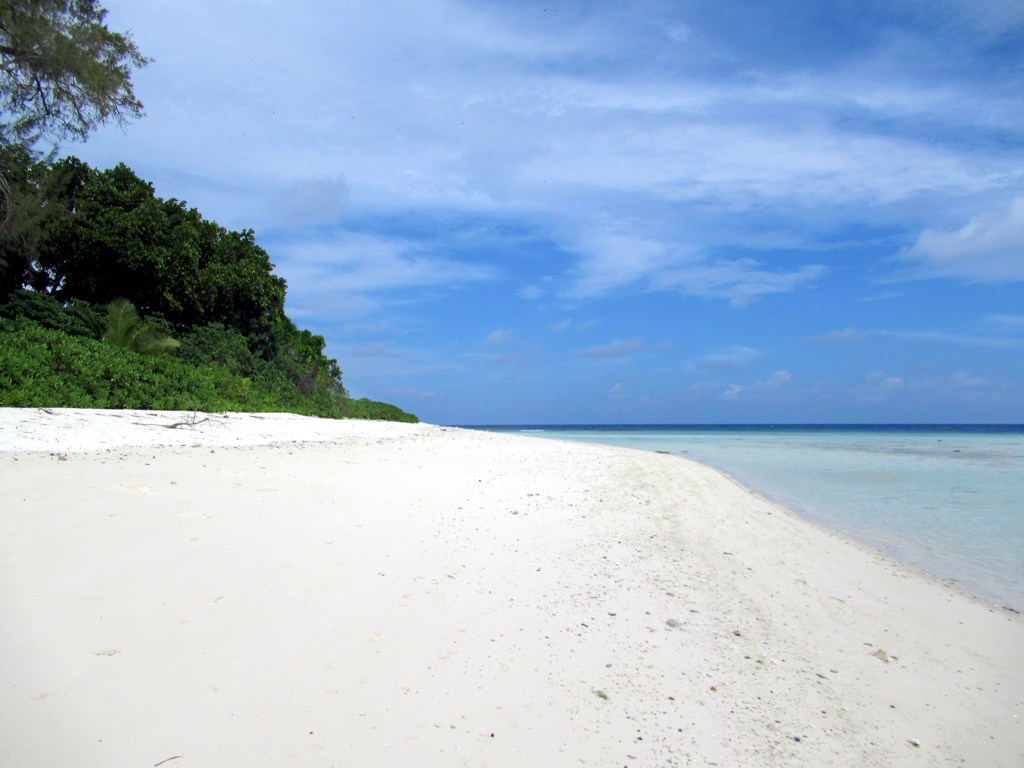
- A beach on D'Arros Island

- Location within Seychelles

Geography
- Location: Indian Ocean
- Coordinates: 05°24′S 53°18′E
- Archipelago: Seychelles
- Adjacent to: Indian Ocean
- Total islands: 1
- Major islands: D'Arros
- Area: 1.71 km^{2} (0.66 sq mi)
- Length: 2.0 km (1.24 mi)
- Width: 1.0 km (0.62 mi)
- Coastline: 5.1 km (3.17 mi)
- Highest elevation: 3 m (10 ft)

Administration
- Seychelles
- Group: Outer Islands
- Sub-Group: Amirante Islands
- Sub-Group: D'Arros Island Marine Protected Area
- Districts: Outer Islands District
- Largest settlement: D'Arros (pop. 42)

Demographics
- Population: 42 (2014)
- Pop. density: 24.5/km^{2} (63.5/sq mi)
- Ethnic groups: Creole, French, East Africans, Indians.

Additional information
- Time zone: SCT (UTC+4)
- ISO code: SC-26
- Official website: www.seychelles.travel/en/discover/the-islands/outer-islands

D'Arros Island is part of the Amirante Islands group, which are in the Outer Islands (Coralline Seychelles) coral archipelago of the Seychelles islands and nation. The island is located west of the granitic Inner Seychelles archipelago, with a distance of 255 km south of Victoria, Seychelles.

== History ==
The island was discovered in 1770 by European sailors. D'Arros Island bears the name of the Baron d'Arros, Marine Commandant of Île de France (now Mauritius), from 1770 to 1771.

Private island

In 1975, The island became the property of prince Shahram Pahlavi Nia of Iran. in 1998 it was bought by French billionaire Liliane Bettencourt (daughter of founder and main shareholder of L'Oreal) for US$18 million.

Nature preserve

In August 2012 it was revealed that the island had once more been sold, for US$60 million, to be managed by the Save Our Seas Foundation Foundation. In 2014, it was officially designated a nature reserve.

== Geography ==
D'Arros Island is located only 2.3 kilometres (1.4 mi) west of the northern part of St. Joseph Atoll, but it is a separate geographical unit, separated by 60–62 metres (197–203 ft) deep water of a 1 kilometre (0.62 mi) wide channel, which is deeper than much of the Amirantes Bank.

The land area of the island occupies 1.71 square kilometres (0.66 mi^{2}). D'Arros Island is an oval-shaped, flat coral sand cay, oriented northeast–southwest, 2 kilometres (1.2 mi) long and 1 kilometre (0.62 mi) wide, and nowhere higher than 3 metres (9.8 ft).

=== Coral reefs ===
The island stands on a detached patch coral reef similarly orientated, with maximum dimensions of 2.6 kilometres (1.6 mi) and 1.4 kilometres (0.87 mi). A shallow sand spit extends 0.2 kilometres (0.12 mi) northeast from it. The island stands on the northern sector of the reef atoll. There are drying reef flats 200–370 metres (660–1,210 ft) wide on its south side, but only a narrow fringing reef about 75 metres (246 ft) wide on its north side.

== Administration ==
The island belongs to Outer Islands District. Being an island with a small population, there are not any government buildings or services. For many services, people have to go to Victoria, which is a difficult task.

== Demographics ==
The island has a permanent population of 42. There are several buildings on the island, with one large house used by the owner and a number of smaller, permanently occupied houses for the staff. A small area of the island is cultivated for personal consumption of the residents. The small village is on the north coast.

== Flora & Fauna ==
Much of the island area is covered by vegetation. The tree tops reach heights of 27 metres (89 ft). The vegetation is dominated by the native coconut palm (Cocos nucifera), and introduced horsetail beefwood (Casuarina equisetifolia) trees.

In 1965, five Seychelles fody (Foudia sechellarum) birds from Cousin Island were introduced to D'Arros and they have since increased to a population of a few hundred.

The Save Our Seas Foundation D'Arros Research Centre mainly undertakes research on sharks, rays and turtles year-round but the centre also hosts visiting research groups and university students.

== Transport ==
A 975 metres (3,199 ft) unpaved airstrip (ICAO: FSDA) bisects the island in the southwest. The island is serviced by an Island Development Company (IDC), Air Seychelles or Zil Air aircraft from Mahé.

== Economics ==
The inhabitants on the island are engaged in very small scale farming and fishing which are mainly for the island consumption.

== Image gallery ==
Map 1

District Map

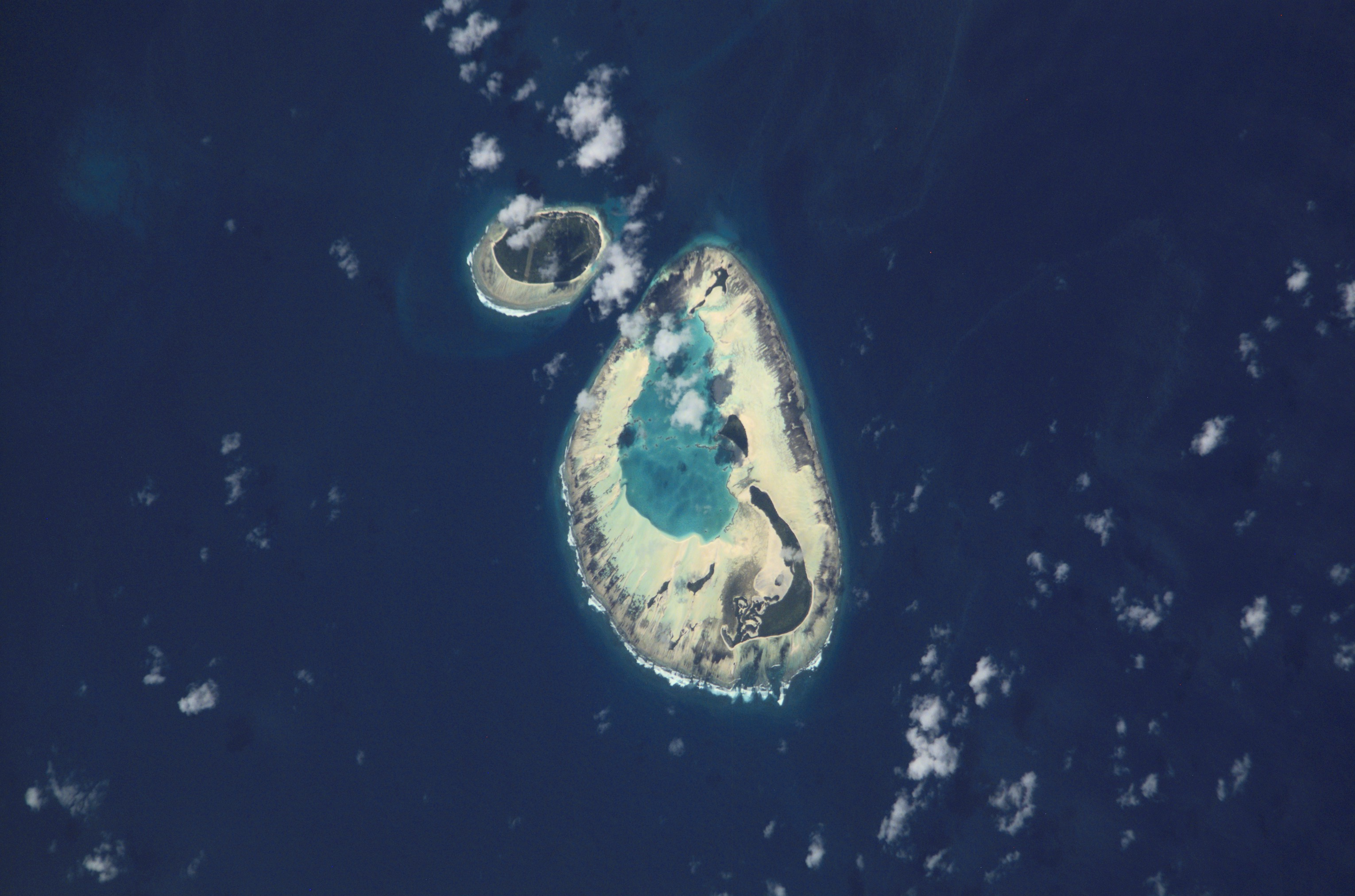
NASA-D'Arros Island

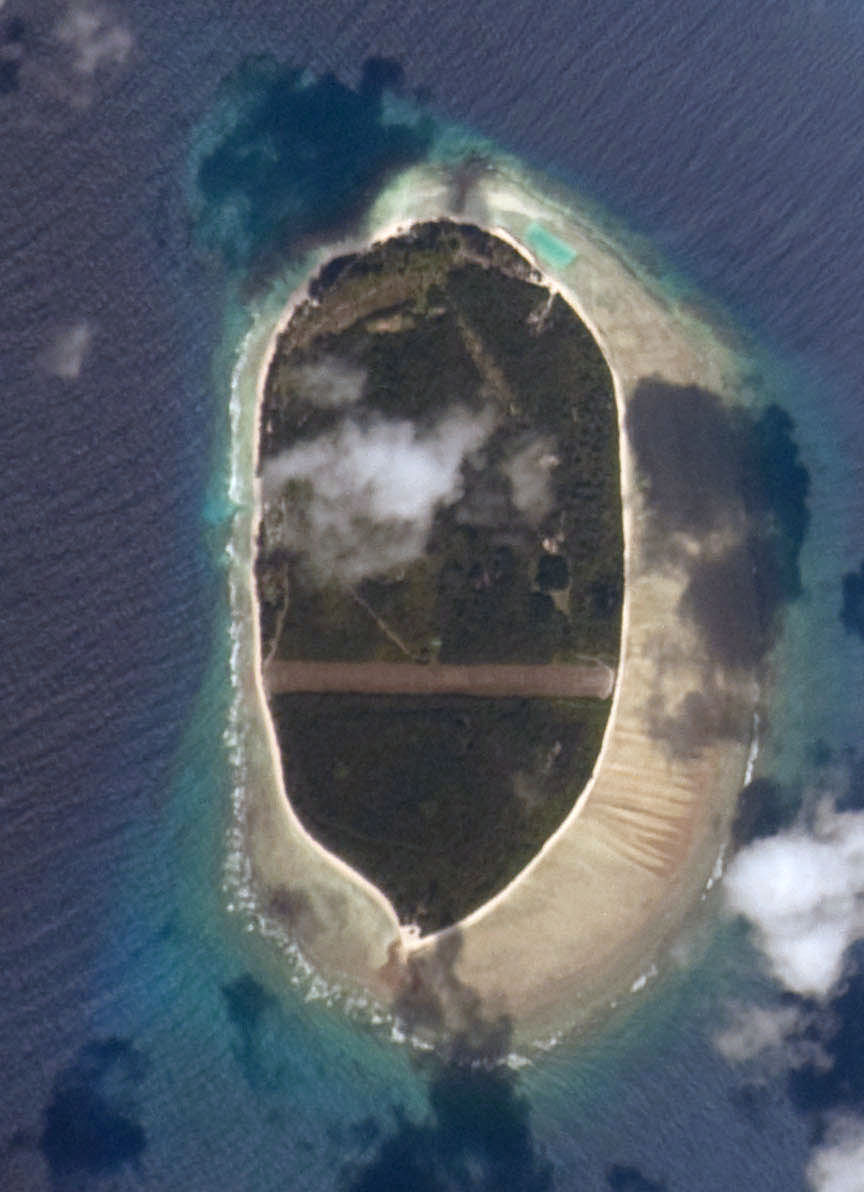
D'Arros Island
