= Outer Islands (Seychelles) =

Islands not on the shallow Seychelles Bank

Native name: Zil Elwannyen Sesel
- Location map of the Outer Islands of the Seychelles archipelago in the western Indian Ocean

Geography
- Location: Indian Ocean
- Coordinates: 5°58′S 53°03′E
- Archipelago: Seychelles
- Adjacent to: Indian Ocean
- Total islands: 200
- Major islands: Alphonse; Desroches; Marie Louise; Coëtivy
- Area: 216.57 km^{2} (83.62 sq mi)
- Highest elevation: 35 m (115 ft)
- Highest point: unnamed dune

Administration
- Seychelles
- Group: Outer Islands
- Districts: Outer Islands District
- Largest settlement: Coëtivy Island (pop. 260)

Demographics
- Population: 1,032 (2021)
- Pop. density: 3.23/km^{2} (8.37/sq mi)
- Ethnic groups: Creole, French, East Africans, Indians.

Additional information
- Time zone: SCT (UTC+4)
- ISO code: SC-26

The Outer Islands or Coralline Seychelles (archipelago) is a collective term for those islands of the Seychelles that are not on the shallow Seychelles Bank (Seychelles Plateau) which defines the location of the granitic Inner Islands archipelago to the east. The local Seychellois Creole name for the outer islands is Zil Elwannyen Sesel, while the French name is Îles Eloignées. They are all of coral formation, and in the western Indian Ocean.

== History ==
Until 2008, the islands were outside the administrative and electoral Districts of Seychelles. In 2008 the shrimp farm closed on Coëtivy Island which caused a wave of job-seekers coming to Mahé. The ministry of tourism was granted a free hand on these islands in order to address the unrest of the population, and declared it a district.

It formed the Islands Development Company (IDC) to control the islands, and prepared a program called 1 hotel 1 island. Each island in the group should be leased to a hotel, which will in turn built several residential homes and facilities on those islands. It required removal of the Protected Area Status from the islands. At first finding hotel chains was difficult, so Coëtivy received a prison, and thus creating jobs for the people who came back to their island. Other islands received questionable facilities as well, e.g. Marie Louise Island a jail, Assumption Island an Army base, but on other islands had developments of resorts. The population increased again, for the first time in a century, from 500 in 2008 to 700 in 2016. Conservation in the outer islands is managed by Island Conservation Society. The Save Our Seas Foundation manages the nature preserve of D'Arros Island and its neighboring atolls.

== Geography ==
The coral islands are flat with elevated coral reefs at different stages of formation. They are generally low-lying, and often form atolls around a central lagoon. The soils of the Corraline Seychelles are generally sandy and infertile, and hold little fresh water. The Inner Islands or Granitic Seychelles, by contrast, are composed of granite on the Seychelles Bank plateau, and are ancient fragments of continental crust. They are generally more mountainous, humid, and populated. The Outer Islands comprise 216.57 square kilometres (83.62 mi^{2}) or 46% of the total land area of the Seychelles, but hold less than 1% of the population of the country. The coral Outer Islands are located at distances of 230–1,150 kilometres (140–710 mi) from Mahé, the nation's principal island, located in the granitic Inner Seychelles.

=== Five groups ===
The Outer Islands are divided into five groups:

1. Southern Coral Group — Île Platte and Coëtivy Island; land area 9.906 square kilometres (3.825 mi^{2})
2. Amirante Islands — 3 atolls (including Desroches Island – Île Desroches, 5 single sand cays including D'Arros Island), and 3 uplifted sand cays; land area 11.582 square kilometres (4.472 mi^{2})
3. Alphonse Group — Alphonse Atoll and St. François Atoll (Bijoutier-St. François); land area 2.21 square kilometres (0.85 mi^{2})
4. Aldabra Group — Aldabra Atoll, Assumption Island, Cosmoledo Atoll, and Astove Island; land area 180 square kilometres (69 mi^{2})
5. Farquhar Group — Farquhar Atoll, Providence Atoll (Providence-Cerf), and St. Pierre Island; land area 12.84 square kilometres (4.96 mi^{2})

== Demography ==
The lack of natural fresh water sources and infertile soils of these islands can sustain human life only with difficulty. As of 2016 the population is 701 although this figure increases during the short summer vacation when Mahé people come to work in tourism and fishing on the islands. There are 12 inhabited islands (2016), The major are Coëtivy with 260 and Desroches with a 100.

== Image gallery ==
Map 1

District Map

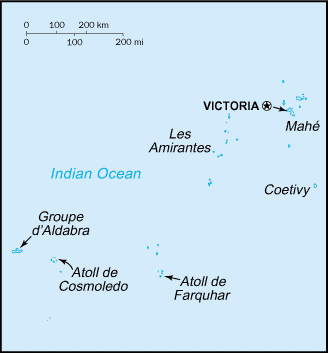
Coralline Seychelles—Outer Islands, to south and west of Mahé and other Inner Islands.
