= List of endemic plants of Seychelles =

The Granitic Seychelles are a group of islands which form the main part of the island country Seychelles. These islands sit on the Seychelles Bank and composed mostly of granite derived from ancient continental crust. The Granitic Seychelles are home to several dozen endemic species and subspecies of plants, including the endemic genera Deckenia, Glionnetia, Lodoicea, Medusagyne, Nephrosperma, Northia, Paragenipa, Phoenicophorium, and Protarum, Roscheria, Vateriopsis, Verschaffeltia, and Xyroschoenus.

Aldabra and Seychelles' other coralline islands – the Amirante Islands, Farquhar Group, and Southern Coral Group (Coëtivy and Île Platte) – which are known as the Outer Islands or Coralline Seychelles, are politically part of Seychelles, but the World Geographical Scheme for Recording Plant Distributions treats them a separate botanical country.

Plants are listed alphabetically by plant family. Plants endemic to specific islands are indicated.

== Acanthaceae ==
- Justicia gardineri Turrill – Silhouette

== Anacardiaceae ==
- Campnosperma seychellarum Marchand

== Apocynaceae ==
- Secamone schimperiana (Hemsl.) Klack.

== Araceae ==
- Protarum Engl.
  - Protarum sechellarum Engl.

== Araliaceae ==
- Astropanax procumbens (Hemsl.) Lowry, G.M.Plunkett, Gostel & Frodin
- Polyscias crassa (Hemsl.) Lowry & G.M.Plunkett
- Polyscias lionnetii (F.Friedmann) Lowry & G.M.Plunkett
- Polyscias sechellarum Baker

== Arecaceae ==
- Deckenia H.Wendl. ex Seem.
  - Deckenia nobilis H.Wendl. ex Seem.
- Lodoicea Comm. ex DC.
  - Lodoicea maldivica (J.F.Gmel.) Pers. – Curieuse and Praslin
- Nephrosperma Balf.f.
- Nephrosperma vanhoutteanum (H.Wendl. ex Van Houtte) Balf.f.
- Phoenicophorium H.Wendl.
  - Phoenicophorium borsigianum (K.Koch) Stuntz
- Roscheria H.Wendl. ex Balf.f.
  - Roscheria melanochaetes (B.S.Williams) H.Wendl. ex Balf.f.
- Verschaffeltia H.Wendl.
  - Verschaffeltia splendida H.Wendl.

== Aspleniaceae ==
- Diplazium sechellarum (Baker) C.Chr.

== Asteraceae ==
- Gynura sechellensis Hemsl.
- Vernonia sechellensis Baker – Mahé

== Balsaminaceae ==
- Impatiens gordonii Horne ex Baker – Mahé

== Begoniaceae ==
- Begonia seychellensis Hemsl. – Mahé and Silhouette

== Bignoniaceae ==
- Colea seychellarum Seem.

== Cyatheaceae ==
- Alsophila sechellarum (Mett.) R.M.Tryon

== Cyperaceae ==
- Costularia xipholepis (Baker) Henriette & Senterre – Mahé
- Mapania floribunda (Nees ex Steud.) T.Koyama
- Mapania seychellaria D.A.Simpson – Praslin
- Xyroschoenus Larridon
  - Xyroschoenus hornei (C.B.Clarke) Larridon

== Dilleniaceae ==
- Dillenia ferruginea (Baill.) Gilg

== Dipterocarpaceae ==
- Vateriopsis F.Heim
  - Vateriopsis seychellarum (Dyer) F.Heim – Mahé

== Ebenaceae ==
- Diospyros boiviniana (Baill.) G.E.Schatz & Lowry

== Erythroxylaceae ==
- Erythroxylum sechellarum O.E.Schulz

== Euphorbiaceae ==
- Excoecaria benthamiana Hemsl.

== Hymenophyllaceae ==
- Trichomanes beaverianum (Senterre & Rouhan) Christenh.
- Trichomanes cupressoides Desv. – Mahé and Silhouette
- Trichomanes fulgens C.Chr.

== Hypoxidaceae ==
- Curculigo maheensis (F.Friedmann) Christenh. & Byng – Mahé
- Curculigo rhizophylla (Baker) T.Durand & Schinz
- Curculigo seychellensis Bojer ex Baker

== Lamiaceae ==
- Achyrospermum seychellarum Baker – Mahé and Silhouette

== Lindsaeaceae ==
- Nesolindsaea kirkii (Hook.) Lehtonen & Christenh.

== Loranthaceae ==
- Bakerella clavata subsp. sechellensis (Baker) Balle

== Marattiaceae ==
- Angiopteris chongsengiana Senterre & I.Fabre
- Ptisana laboudalloniana Senterre & I.Fabre

== Melastomataceae ==
- Memecylon elaeagni Blume

== Moraceae ==
- Ficus reflexa subsp. sechellensis (Baker) C.C.Berg
- Trilepisium gymnandrum (Baker) J.Gerlach

== Myrtaceae ==
- Syzygium wrightii (Baker) A.J.Scott

== Nepenthaceae ==
- Nepenthes pervillei Blume – Mahé and Silhouette

== Ochnaceae ==
- Medusagyne Baker
  - Medusagyne oppositifolia Baker – Mahé

== Orchidaceae ==
- Eulophia seychellarum Rolfe ex Summerh. – Mahé
- Malaxis seychellarum (Kraenzl.) Summerh.
- Vanilla phalaenopsis Rchb.f. ex Van Houtte

== Pandanaceae ==
- Martellidendron hornei (Balf.f.) Callm. & Chassot
- Pandanus balfourii Martelli
- Pandanus multispicatus Balf.f.
- Pandanus sechellarum Balf.f.

== Piperaceae ==
- Piper silhouettanum J.Gerlach

== Pittosporaceae ==
- Pittosporum senacia subsp. wrightii (Hemsl.) Cufod. ex F.Friedmann – Mahé and Silhouette

== Polypodiaceae ==
- Bolbitis bipinnatifida (Mett.) Ching
- Dryopteris wardii (Baker) Kuntze
- Elaphoglossum hornei C.Chr.
- Grammitis pervillei (Mett.) Tardieu
- Parapolystichum hornei (Baker) Rouhan
- Tectaria pleiotoma (Baker) C.Chr.

== Primulaceae ==
- Myrsine seychellarum (Mez) Ricketson & Pipoly – Mahé and Silhouette

== Putranjivaceae ==
- Drypetes riseleyi Airy Shaw

== Rubiaceae ==
- Craterispermum microdon Baker – Mahé
- Craterispermum praslinense Padayachy & Senterre – Praslin
- Craterispermum silhouettense Padayachy & Senterre – Silhouette
- Glionnetia Tirveng.
  - Glionnetia sericea (Baker) Tirveng. – Mahé and Silhouette
- Ixora pudica Baker – Mahé and Silhouette
- Paragenipa Baill.
  - Paragenipa lancifolia (Bojer ex Baker) Tirveng. & Robbr.
- Peponidium carinatum (Baker) Kainul. & Razafim.
- Peponidium celastroides (Baker) Kainul. & Razafim. – Mahé and Silhouette
- Psychotria silhouettae F.Friedmann – Silhouette
- Rothmannia annae (E.P.Wright) Keay
- Seychellea Razafim., Kainul. & Rydin
  - Seychellea sechellarum (Baker) Razafim., Kainul. & Rydin

== Salicaceae ==
- Ludia mauritiana var. sechellensis F.Friedmann
- Allophylus sechellensis Summerh.

== Sapotaceae ==
- Mimusops sechellarum (Oliv.) Hemsl.
- Northia Hook.f.
  - Northia seychellana Hook.f.

== Selaginellaceae ==
- Selaginella sechellarum Baker

== Simaroubaceae ==
- Soulamea terminalioides Baker – Mahé and Silhouette

== Stemonuraceae ==
- Grisollea thomassetii Hemsl. – Mahé and Silhouette

== Triuridaceae ==
- Sciaphila thomassetii (Hemsl.) V.Merckx & Byng – Mahé
