= Granitic Seychelles =

Islands in Seychelles

Granitic Seychelles Granitic Seychelles forests
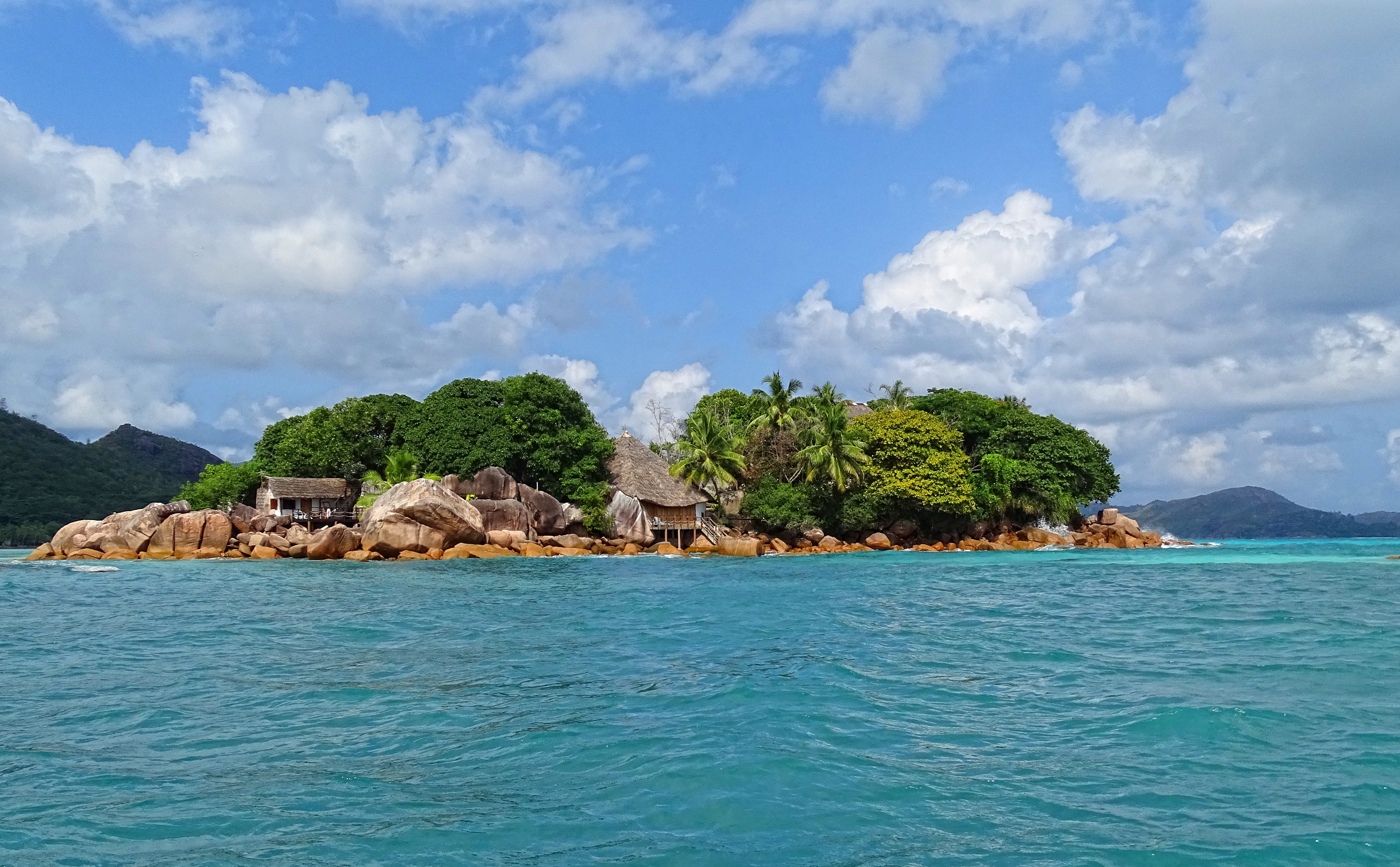
- The small granitic island of Chauve Souris (Praslin)

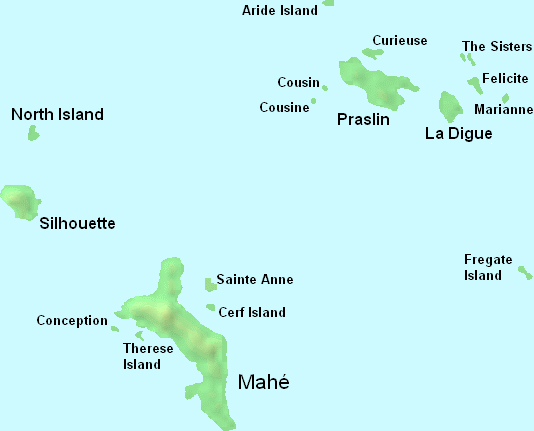
- Map of the Granitic Seychelles

Ecology
- Realm: Afrotropical
- Biome: Tropical and subtropical moist broadleaf forests

Geography
- Area: 166 km^{2} (64 mi^{2})
- Countries: Seychelles
- Coordinates: 4.516°S 55.577°E

Conservation
- Conservation status: Critical/endangered
- Protected: 38 km^{2} (23%)

The Granitic Seychelles are the islands in Seychelles which lie in central position on the Seychelles Bank and are composed of granite rock. They make up the majority of the Inner Islands, which in addition include the coral islands along of the rim of the Seychelles Bank, namely Bird Island and Denis Island. The Granitic Seychelles contrast with the Coralline Seychelles or the Outer Islands, several island groups made up of low coral islands with dry, infertile soils.

The Granitic Seychelles are home to tropical moist forests, with several endemic species, including the coco de mer (Lodoicea maldivica), and the jellyfish tree (Medusagyne oppositifolia).

== Geography ==
Mahé is the largest and tallest island in Seychelles, at 145 square km and up to 905 m elevation. There are 43 granitic islands, in descending order of size: Mahé, Praslin, Silhouette, La Digue, Curieuse, Félicité, Frégate, Ste. Anne, North, Cerf, Marianne, Grand Sœur, Thérèse, Aride, Conception, Petite Sœur, Cousin, Cousine, Long, Récif, Round (Praslin), Anonyme, Mamelles, Moyenne, Ile aux Vaches Marines, L'Islette, Beacon (Ile Sèche), Cachée, Cocos, Round (Mahé), L'Ilot Frégate, Booby, Chauve Souris (Mahé), Chauve Souris (Praslin), Ile La Fouche, Hodoul, L'Ilot, Rat, Souris, St. Pierre (Praslin), Zavé, Harrison Rocks (Grand Rocher).

The Granitic Seychelles are fragments of the ancient supercontinent of Gondwana, and have been separated from other continents for 75 million years. The Granitic Seychelles form the northernmost part of the submarine Mascarene Plateau. There are mafic xenolith intrusions in the granite in some areas.

== Climate ==
The archipelago is about 5 degrees south of the equator, and has a humid tropical climate with little seasonal variation in temperature. Average annual rainfall varies with elevation, and exposure, ranging from 2,300 to 5,000 mm. There are heavy monsoon rains in the summer (November to February). Trade winds blow steadily from the southeast during the cooler months.

== Flora ==
The native vegetation of these islands consisted of palm, pandanus screw pines, and hardwood forest with mossy, ferny, cloud forest at higher elevations. The flora shows links with both Madagascar to the south and the African mainland to the west. Having been so isolated the islands are rich in endemic plant life including palm trees such as the coco de mer.

The Granitic Seychelles have a relatively low number of flowering plant species, but a high rate of endemism. Approximately 268 flowering plant species are native to the island, in 216 genera. 28% of the species are endemic, with at least 13 endemic genera, of which most are monospecific. Endemic genera include Deckenia, Glionnetia, Lodoicea, Medusagyne, Nephrosperma, Northia, Paragenipa, Phoenicophorium, Protarum, Roscheria, Seychellea, Vateriopsis, and Xyroschoenus. 35% of flowering plant species are endangered.

== Fauna ==
The unique lizard and reptile populations of the Seychelles include seven species of caecilian and the iconic giant tortoises, Aldabrachelys gigantea arnoldi on the Granitic Seychelles, and Dipsochelys dussumieri on Aldabra. There have been some extinctions but the remaining endemic birds of these islands include the Seychelles scops owl (Otus insularis) and the Seychelles paradise flycatcher (Terpsiphone corvina).

== Threats and preservation ==
200 years of human settlement has seen the removal of much of the ancient habitat (including planting of coconut, vanilla and cinnamon), and the introduction of damaging invasive species. The Vallée de Mai on Praslin is the largest example of natural palm forest and is a World Heritage Site.
