= Mahé highlands and surrounding areas Important Bird Area =

Coordinates: 04°38′S 55°25′E

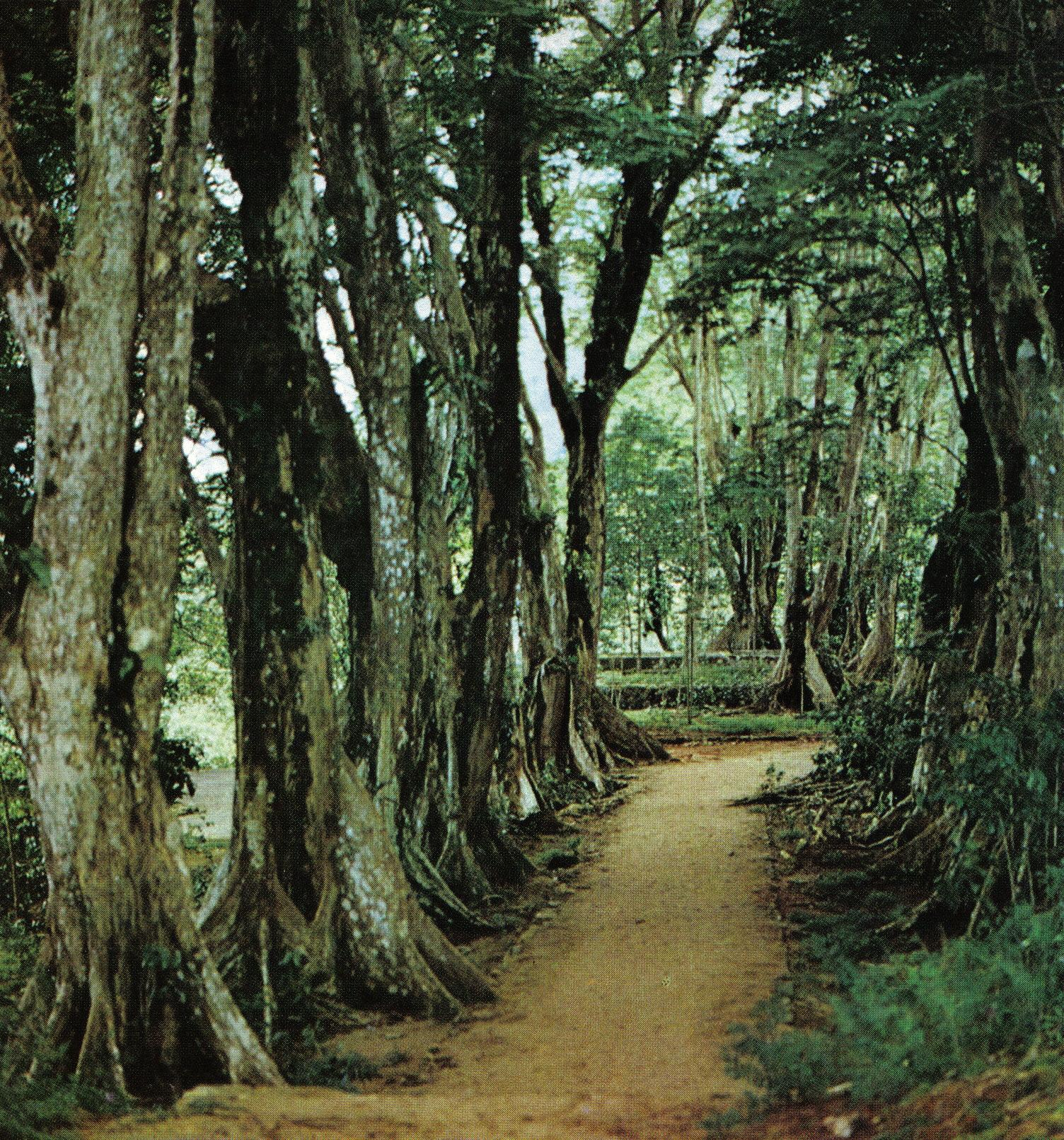
Rosewood trees along a track in the Morne Seychellois National Park

The Mahé highlands and surrounding areas Important Bird Area occupy the central and north-western part of the island of Mahé in the Seychelles archipelago of the western Indian Ocean.

== Description ==
The Important Bird Area (IBA) has an area of 4600 ha, covering about 20% of the island. It encompasses the 3045 ha Morne Seychellois National Park, which includes the 914 m peak of Morne Seychellois, the highest mountain of Seychelles. During the 19th and the first half of the 20th centuries there was extensive exploitation of the original forests for timber as well as for cinnamon plantations. Present human activity, including forestry, tourism and some tea cultivation, affect less than 10% of the area of the IBA.

=== Flora and fauna ===
Land within the national park is characterised by steep terrain covered with dense secondary forest and shrub woodland, punctuated by cliffs and large granite boulders. Above 600 m elevation there are remnant stands of primary forest with few exotics. Endemic species include the very rare Medusagyne oppositifolia and Vateriopsis seychellarum, the commoner Dillenia ferruginea and Northia hornei, as well as Phoenicophorium borsigianum, Nephrosperma vanhoutteanum, Erythroxylum sechellarum, Nepenthes pervillei and Secamone schimperianus.

Outside the national park the IBA includes the mountainous area to the south-east as well as the adjacent districts of La Misère and Cascade. The latter contain much anthropogenic habitat, such as orchards, small farms, tea plantations, housing, roads and other infrastructure. Forests at low and intermediate elevations are dominated by exotic plants such as Cinnamomum verum, Falcataria moluccana (= Paraserianthes falcataria), Alstonia macrophylla and Chrysobalanus icaco.

The site has been identified as an IBA by BirdLife International because it supports populations of Seychelles kestrels, Seychelles blue pigeons, Seychelles scops owls, Seychelles swiftlets, Seychelles bulbuls, Seychelles white-eyes and Seychelles sunbirds.

== Selected points of interest ==
=== Morne Seychellois ===
Morne Seychellois is the largest mountain in the Seychelles, standing at 905 m.

=== Morne Blanc ===
Morne Blanc is a large peak overlooking the west coast of Mahe. At a height of 667 m, it is the third tallest mountain in the Seychelles.

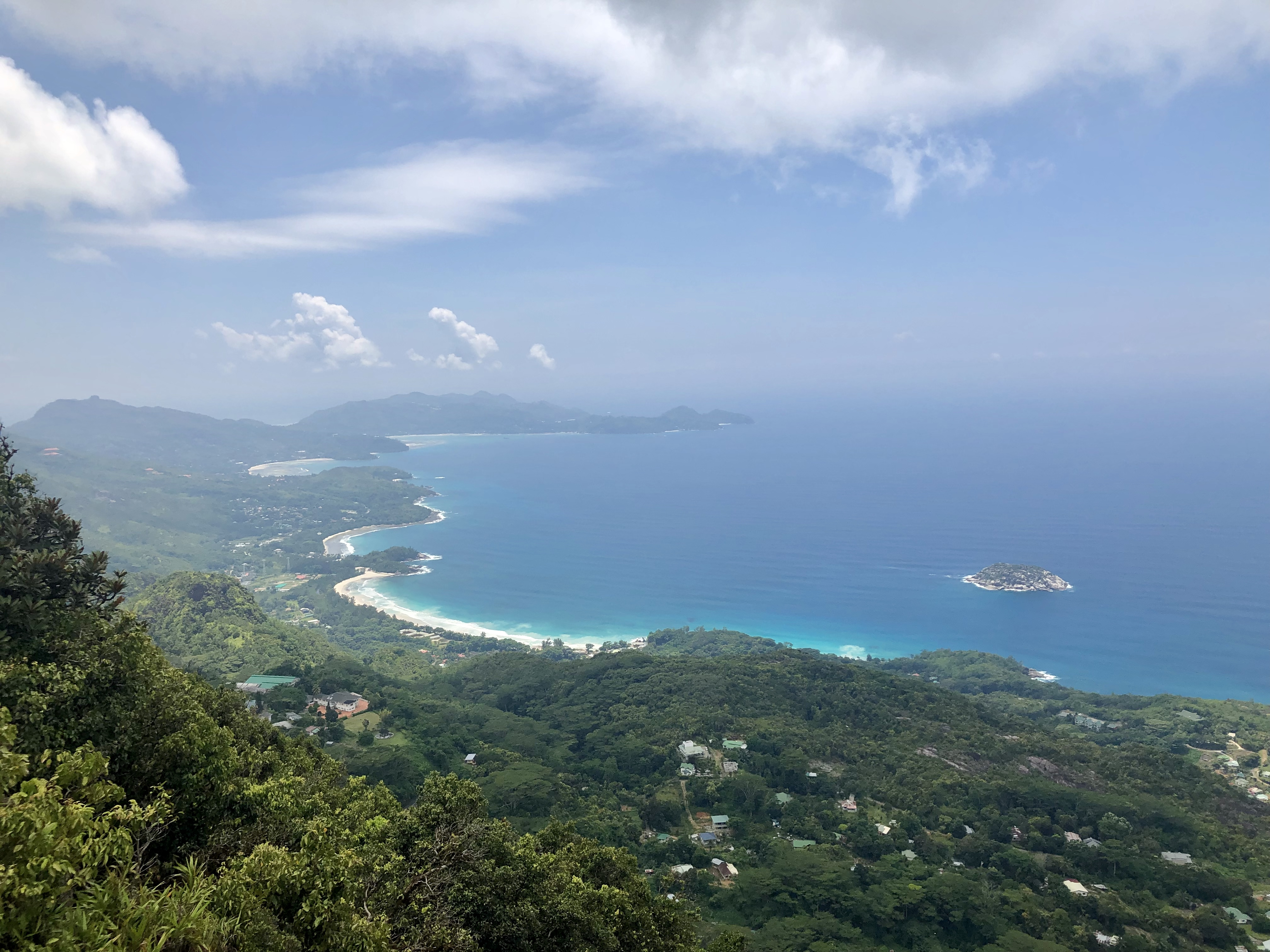
The view from Morne Blanc facing south. Grand Anse and Ile aux Vaches are seen in the foreground.

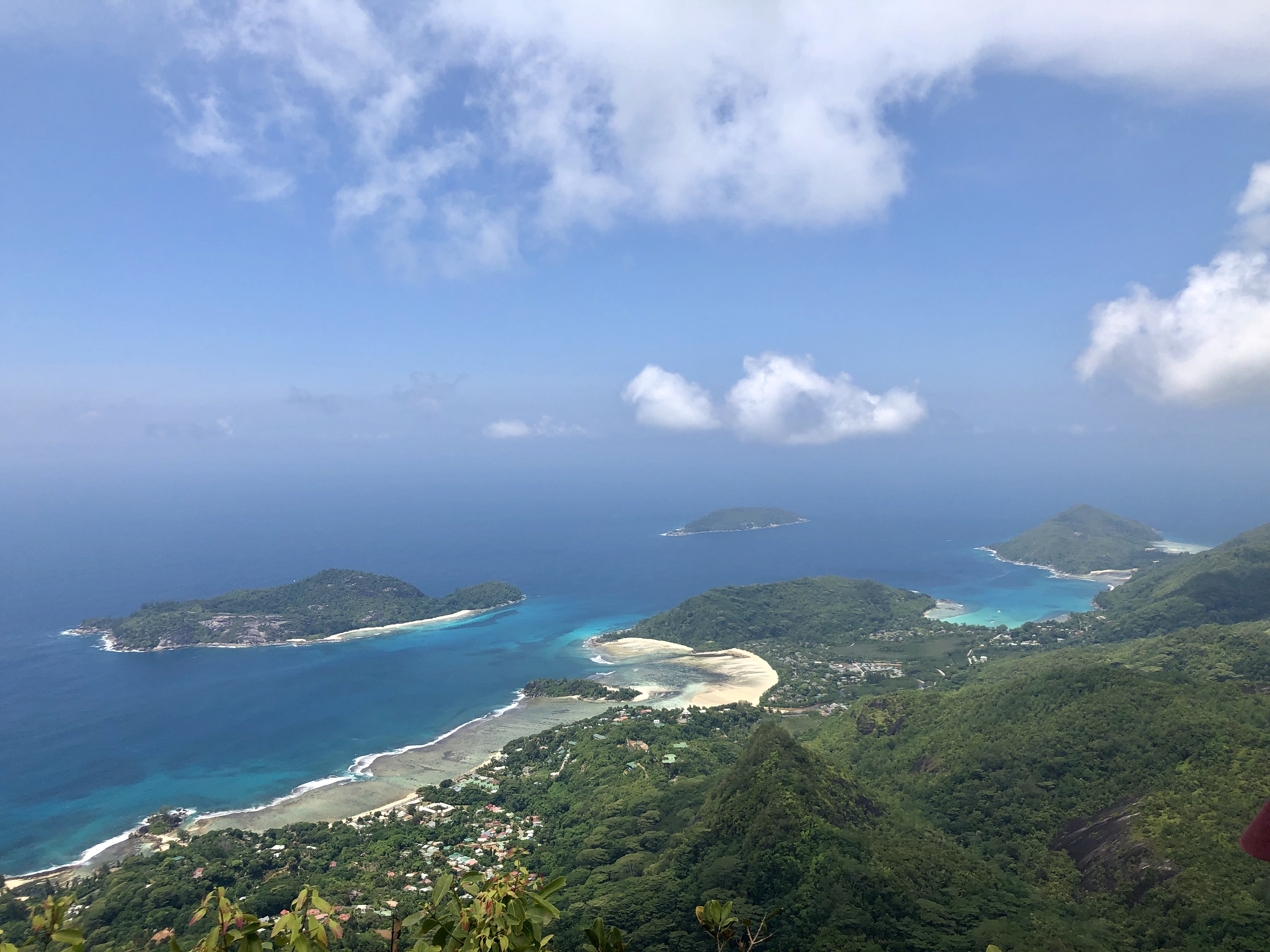
The view from Morne Blanc facing west. Port Glaud is in the foreground. The islands Therese and Conception are in the distance. The bay to the right is Port Launay Marine National Park.

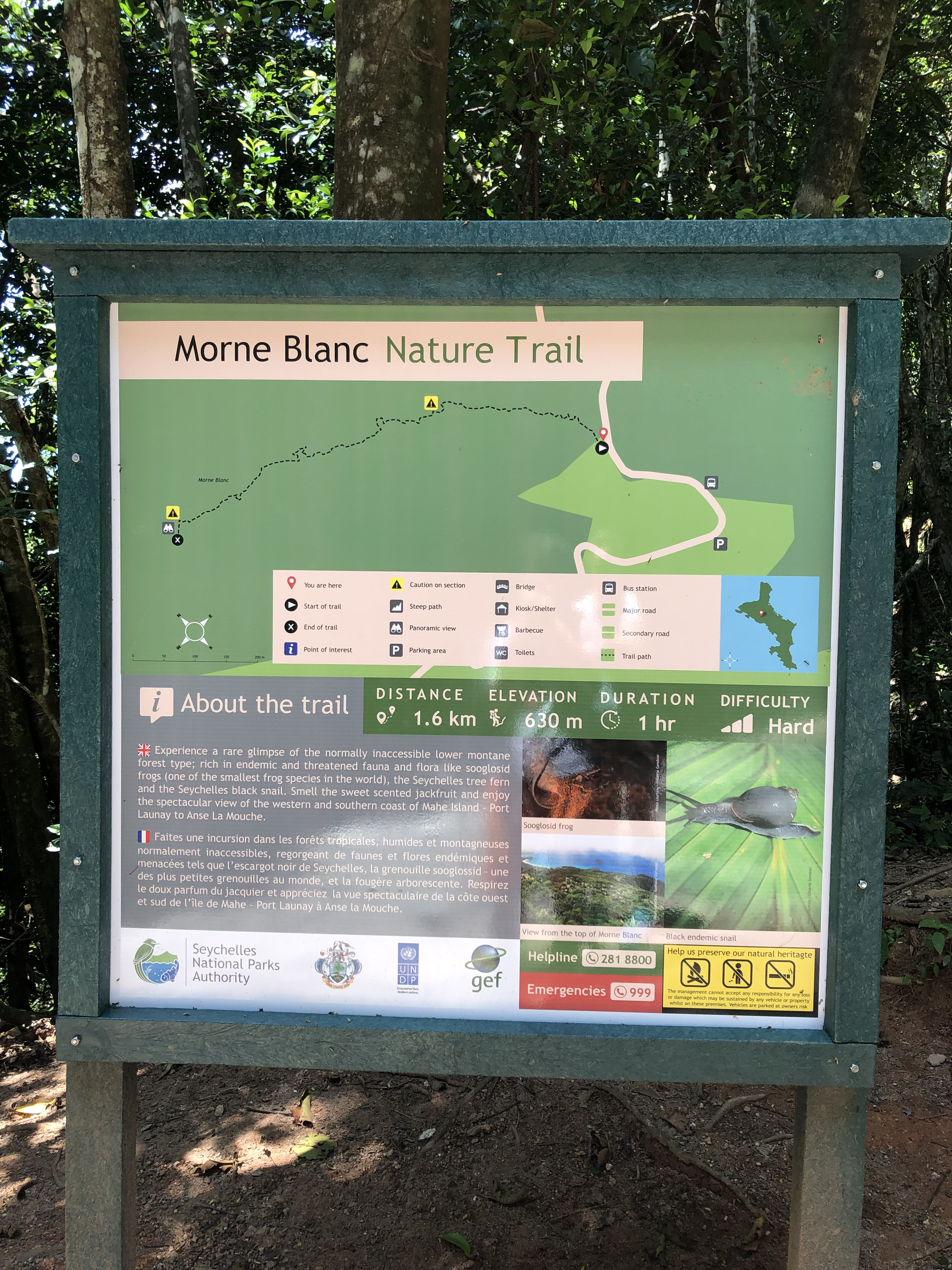
The trailhead map of Morne Blanc Trail

=== Anse Major ===
Anse Major is a small beach on the northwest of the island of Mahe, in the Seychelles. The beach can be reached by a short hike from Bel Ombre just to the west of Beau Vallon. Alternatively the beach can be reached by water. There are no nearby roads. The majority of this trail passes through the Morne Seychellois National Park, and takes approximately 3 hours to cover both directions.

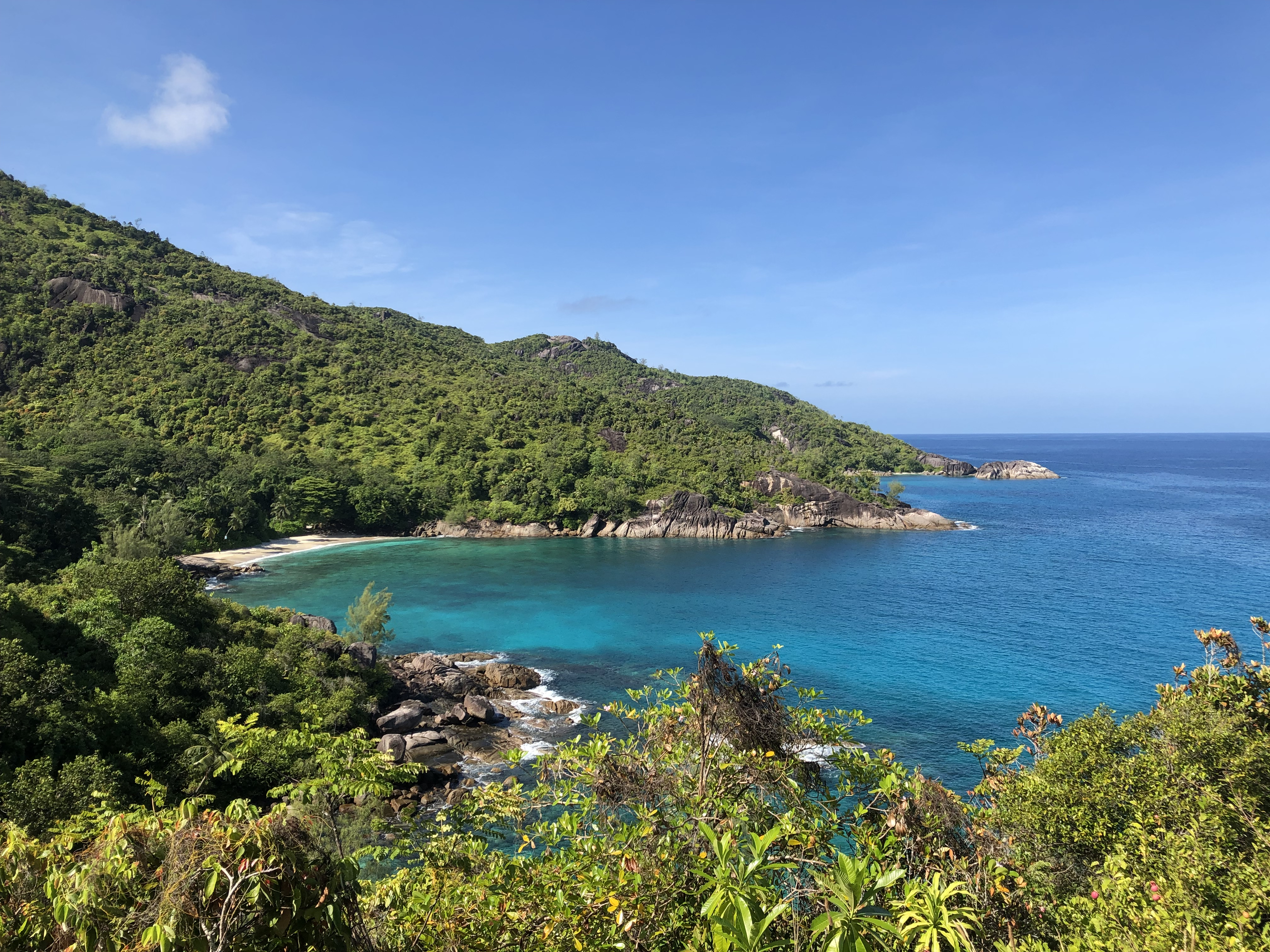
An overlook of Anse Major from a nearby hill on the trail from Bel Ombre

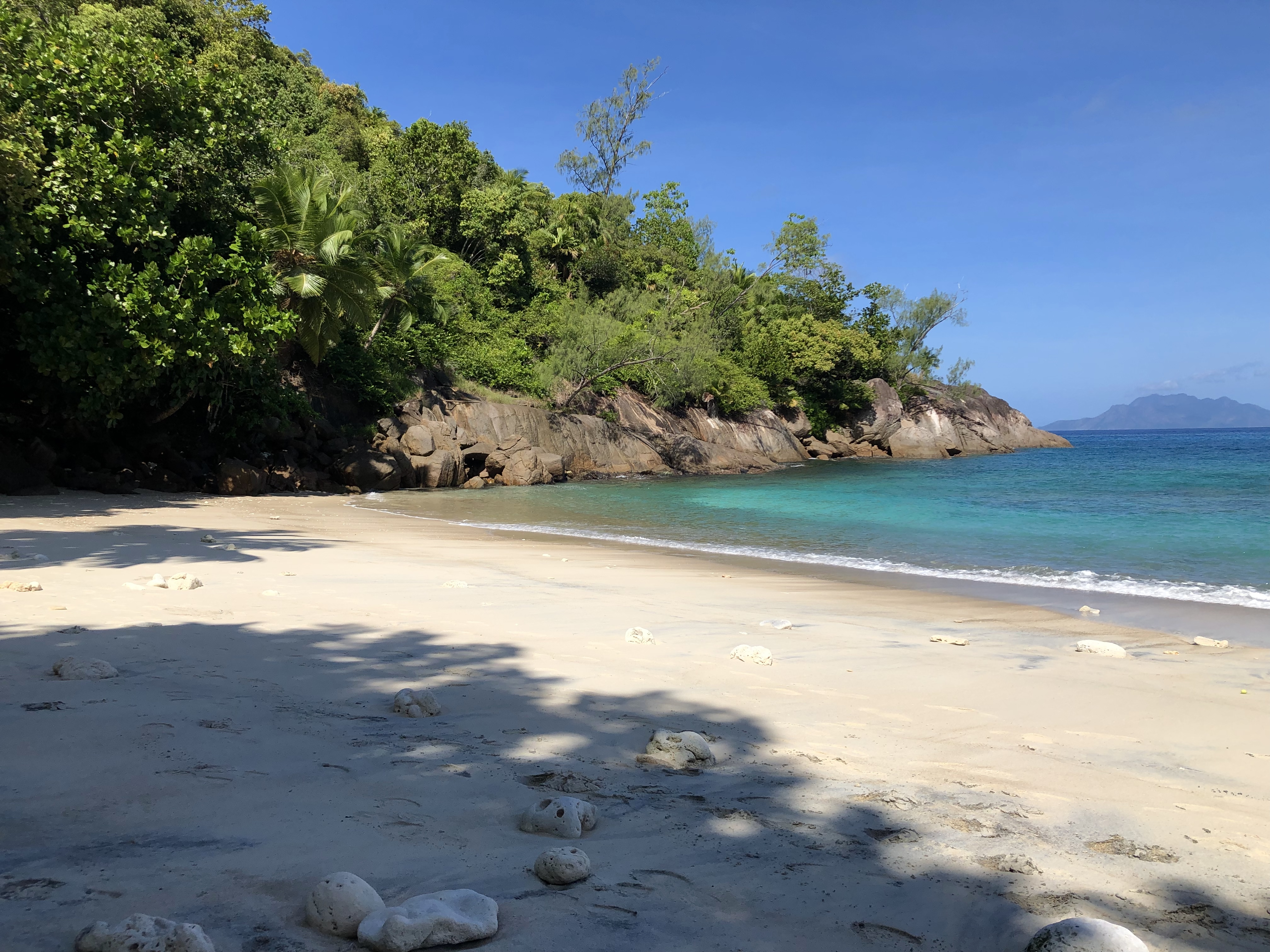
A view from Anse Major with Silhouette Island in the distant background

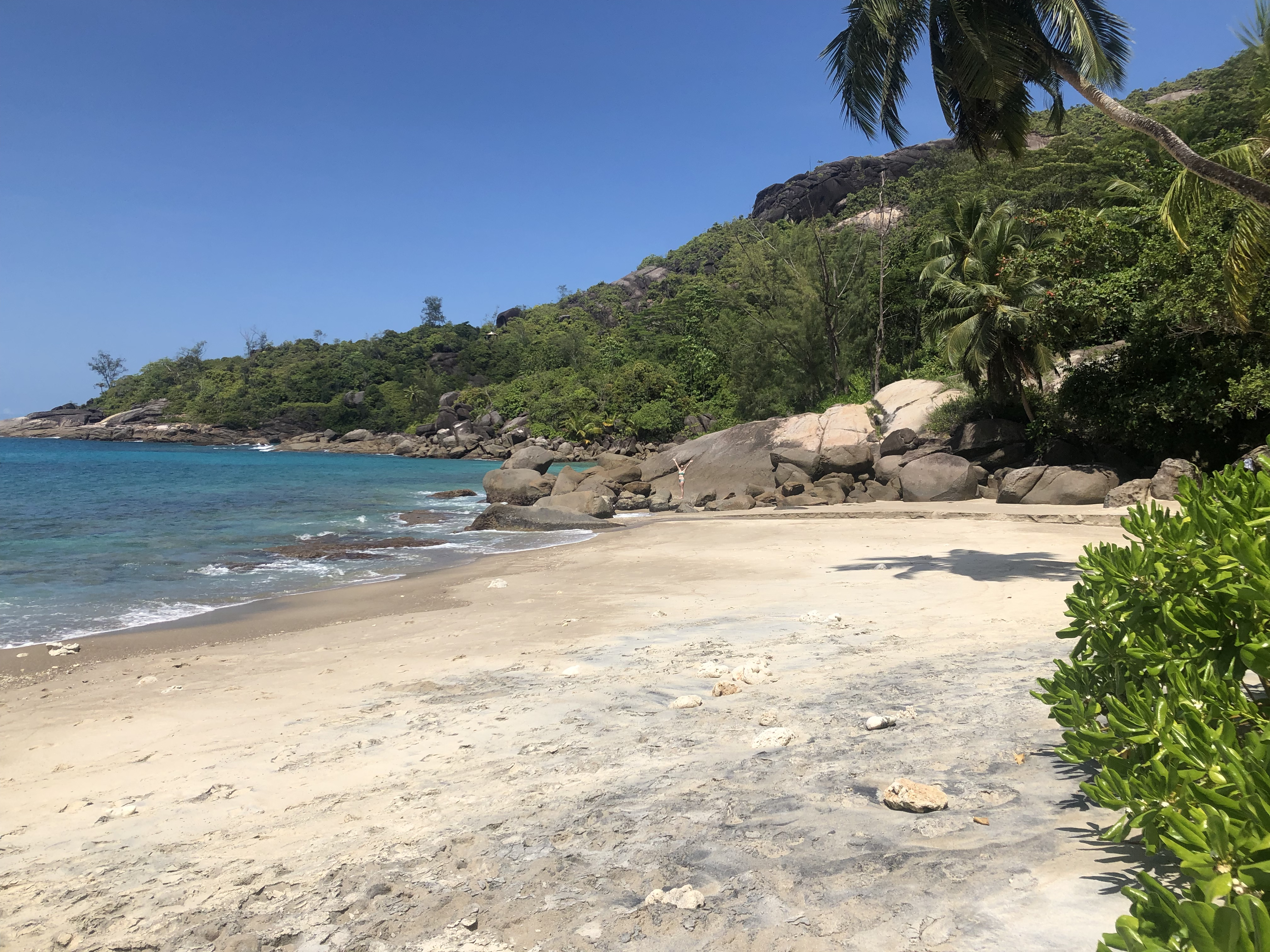
A View of Anse Major facing north
