= Protarum =

Conservation status
- Vulnerable (IUCN 3.1)

Scientific classification
- Kingdom: Plantae
- Clade: Tracheophytes
- Clade: Angiosperms
- Clade: Monocots
- Order: Alismatales
- Family: Araceae
- Subfamily: Aroideae
- Tribe: Colocasieae
- Genus: Protarum; Engl.
- Species: P. sechellarum

Binomial name
- Protarum sechellarum Engl.
- The genus Protarum is only found in the Seychelles.

Genus of flowering plants

Protarum is a monotypic genus of flowering plants in the arum family, Araceae. It contains only Protarum sechellarum, which is endemic to Seychelles and the only Araceae native to the Seychelles Islands. It is known locally in French as arouroute de linde marron (brown Indian arrowroot) or in Seychellois Creole as larourout dilenn maron (brown eggplant).

== Taxonomy ==
Genus Protarum, containing the single species Protarum sechellarum, was initially described by German botanist Adolf Engler in 1901 based upon material collected by Andreas Franz Wilhelm Schimper from the forests of Mont Harrison on Mahé during the Valdivia Expedition in 1899. Engler treated Protarum as a unique tribe within subfamily Aroideae.

The relationship of Protarum to other Araceae is still not fully resolved and has so far has proved difficult to place, even with molecular markers. Many of its morphological and anatomical characteristics represent an intermediate between subfamily Aroideae and the Old World Colocasioideae. It was treated in 1973 as being within tribe Areae, transferred to family Colocasieae in 1990, and further placed within subfamily Colocasioideae in 1997.

A 2004 biogeographical and phylogenetic analysis by German botanist Susanne Renner et al. used chloroplast and mitochondrial DNA for genetic sequencing and found Protarum to have highly divergent sequence motifs. Renner et al. suggested Protarum is potentially ancestral to Old & New World Caladieae, and found that, along with genus Pistia, it comprised the most basal branches of a grade containing tribes Colocasieae, Arisaemateae, and Areae.

A 2008 phylogenetic analysis by Lidia I. Cabrera et al. suggested that Protarum was most closely related to genus Pistia, and that it should be removed from Colocasieae and instead placed in its own subfamily, Protareae.

Protarum sechellarum has 2n = 28 medium-sized chromosomes.

== Description ==
Protarum sechellarum is a herbaceous geophytic plant, reaching up to 40–50 cm (16–20 in) in height and growing from a globe-shaped tuber which is light brown outside and reddish inside. Tubers are about 12 cm (4.7 in) in length & 8 cm (3.1 in) in diameter and have numerous, tightly clustered annular leaf scars. It is seasonally dormant.

It grows only a single pedatisect to radiatisect leaf of up to 80 cm (31 in) in diameter, with between 5 - 11 leaflets. Leaflets are narrow and elliptic with a prominent midrib, tapering to a slender point. The leaflets are 25–40 cm (9.8–15.7 in) in length and 8–10 cm (3.1–3.9 in) in width and typically uniformly dark green, although juvenile leaves may have striking, pinkish and silver coloration.

Flowering has been observed in October, March, and April, and is reportedly infrequent, possibly occurring once every one to two years. The single, unisexual flower may appear before or along with the leaf. It is borne on a short peduncle and consists of a spathe, 13–18 cm (5.1–7.1 in), which is grayish-green and becomes purple or red towards the base. Contained within the spathe is a single spadix, 8–12 cm (3.1–4.7 in), with female flowers at the base and male flowers in the middle. Male and female flowers are separated by a sterile section composed of fused, reduced stamens.

The staminodes surrounding each female flower are unusual among more derived Araceae. Bisexual flowers are more typical for basal Araceae species, and Protarum sechellarum's unisexual flowers may indicate the species maintains morphological features lost in other derived Araceae species.

Fruiting has been observed in October; the fruits are small, egg-shaped berries, densely arranged at the base of the spadix. The egg-shaped berries are 1.2-1.5 cm long, and turn bright orange when ripe. When berries mature, the inflorescence will curve to expose them. Each berry typically contains a single seed, which is oblong or oval in shape, about 1 cm long, and dark to blackish brown.

== Distribution ==
It is endemic to humid montane forests of the Seychelles Islands, being found on Mahé, Silhouette and Praslin at elevations of 400–900 m (1,300–3,000 ft). It occurs as scattered groups of individuals, and is not common but can be locally abundant where conditions are favorable.

Protarum sechellarum possibly represents an ancient lineage of Aroideae which diverged from an ancestor originating in the Tethys region. It may have diverged and survived on the Seychelles Islands before their isolation from Madagascar and India some 85-90 million years ago in the Late Cretaceous, or it may have reached the Seychelles Islands after their separation from the Indian Plate approximately 70 million years ago via overseas dispersal from Africa or Madagascar.

== Habitat and ecology ==
Protarum sechellarum grows in shaded areas of humid, warm mist forest, palm forest, or moss forest in humus-rich soil or among leaf litter in crevices of large, granitic rocks. It is often found in mossy pockets between rocks or boulders which have filled in with humus. Although it prefers shade, it can also be found in open sections of forest with more sun exposure. It is not considered to be well-adapted for long-distance dispersal.

Little is known about Protarum sechellarum's ecology and life history. It is often associated with palms, and it has been found in palm forest alongside sea coconut (Lodoicea maldivica), Roscheria melanochaetes, thief palm (Phoenicophorium borsigianum), capucin (Northia seychellana), Dillenia ferruginea, Aphloia theiformis, Polyscias crassa, and Psychotria pervillei. Near the summit of Morne Blanc, despite the invasive Ceylon cinnamon tree (Cinnamomum verum) being heavily present, Protarum sechellarum has been found growing alongside other native species such as Curculigo sechellensis.

The larva of Hippotion eson, an Afrotropical hawkmoth in family Sphingidae, have been found on Protarum sechellarum, and are known to utilize it as a food source and host plant.

== Status and conservation ==
It is classified as Vulnerable on the IUCN Red List. Much of its habitat is remote and relatively undisturbed by human activity, and although there have been no surveys of total population size, it is reportedly not uncommon in appropriate habitat. Populations are widely distributed and located in protected areas, including the Morne Seychellois National Park, Silhouette National Park, and Praslin National Park. It has been suggested that further surveying may reveal a higher population of Protarum sechellarum.

Protarum sechellarum's apparent poor recruitment and wild reproduction rates, limited seed dispersal range, low population density, and limited range represent possible threats to long-term survival. A reduction in cloud forest cover and changes to temperature and humidity due to climate change could also threaten the species; the forests it inhabits have a relatively stable humidity of near 100% and temperatures averaging from 27–35 °C (81–95 °F).

The widely scattered, small populations may render Protarum sechellarum vulnerable to the impacts of invasive species. The lowland forests of its range are dominated by invasive species, and the Ceylon cinnamon tree, which has escaped from cultivation on plantations, is extremely prevalent in mid-elevation forests. The introduced lesser hedgehog tenrec (Echinops telfairi) is already known to cause damage to other native plant communities of the Seychelles Islands and may also damage this species.

It is generally uncommon in cultivation. Multiple wild-collected plants were brought into cultivation for conservation purposes at botanical gardens and private gardens between 1962 and 1992; however, none of these plants survived. Currently, living specimens are in cultivation with the Eden Project in the United Kingdom and at the Seychelles National Biodiversity Centre.
