= Sèche Island =

Island in the Seychelles

Native name: Beacon Island Nickname: Île Sèche
- Location within Seychelles

Geography
- Location: Seychelles, Indian Ocean
- Coordinates: 4°36′S 55°31′E
- Archipelago: Inner Islands, Seychelles
- Adjacent to: Indian Ocean
- Total islands: 1
- Major islands: Sèche
- Area: 0.02 km^{2} (0.0077 sq mi)
- Length: 0.16 km (0.099 mi)
- Width: 0.11 km (0.068 mi)
- Coastline: 0.63 km (0.391 mi)
- Highest elevation: 30 m (100 ft)
- Highest point: Beacon peak

Administration
- Seychelles
- Group: Granitic Seychelles
- Sub-Group: Mahe Islands
- Sub-Group: St. Anne Islands
- Districts: Mont Fleuri

Demographics
- Population: 0 (2014)
- Pop. density: 0/km^{2} (0/sq mi)
- Ethnic groups: Creole, French, East Africans, Indians.

Additional information
- Time zone: SCT (UTC+4)
- ISO code: SC-18
- Official website: www.seychelles.travel/en/discover/the-islands/

Île Sèche is an islet in Seychelles.

It lies 1.5 km of the eastern point of Ste. Anne Island, and 7.5 km from Mahe. and reaches an elevation of 30 meters. Small, rocky, boulder-strewn and uninhabited, it is the nesting ground of sea-gulls. The island is a granite rock on top of which some low growing trees.

The tiny island is also known as Beacon island.

About 2.15 km to its south lies some granite rocks called Harrison Rocks, 0.30 acres in size.

== Image gallery ==
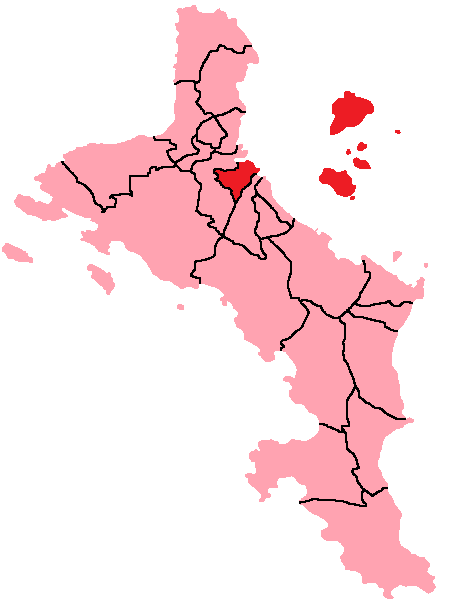
District Map

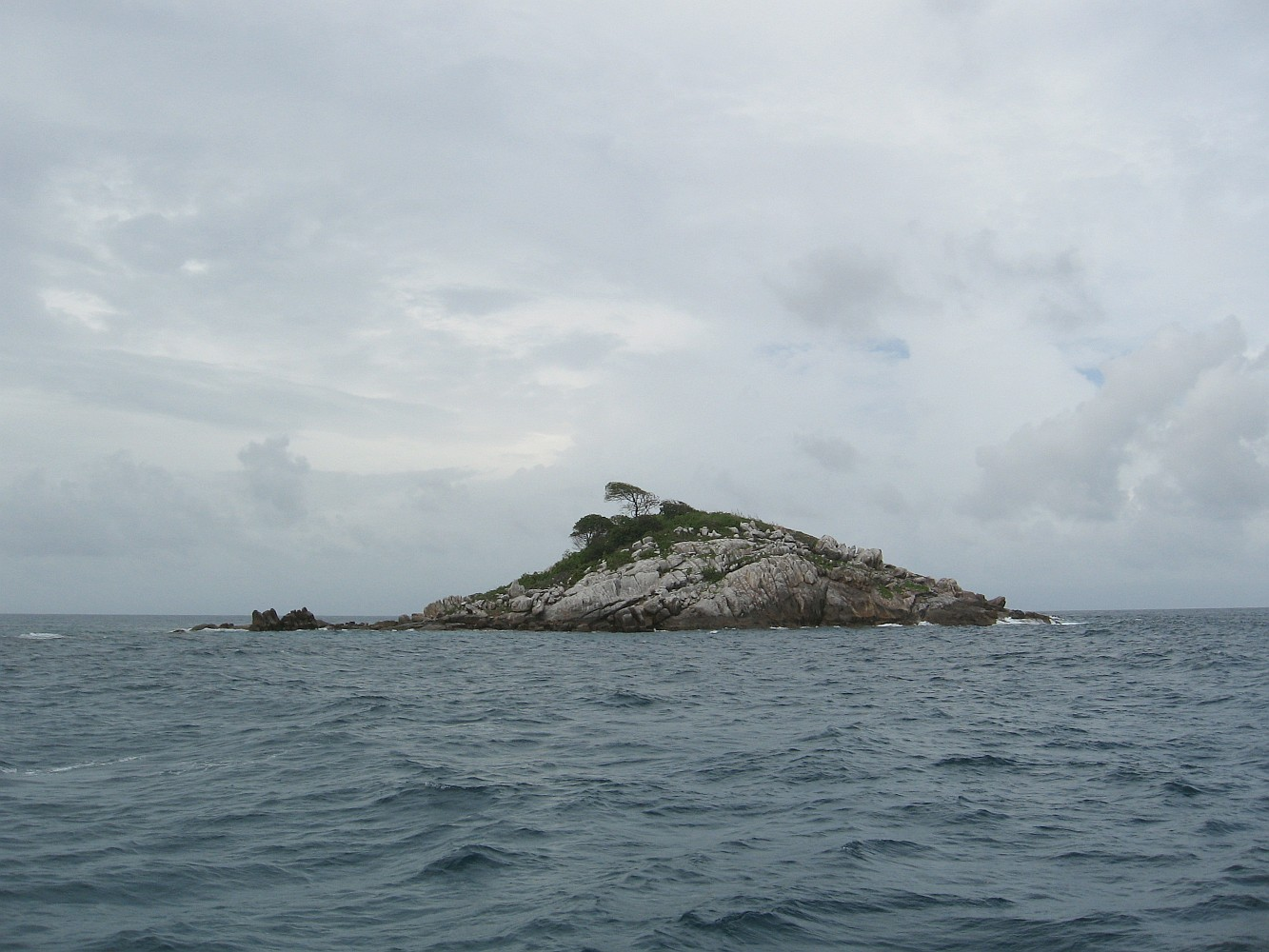
Beacon island, Ile Seche

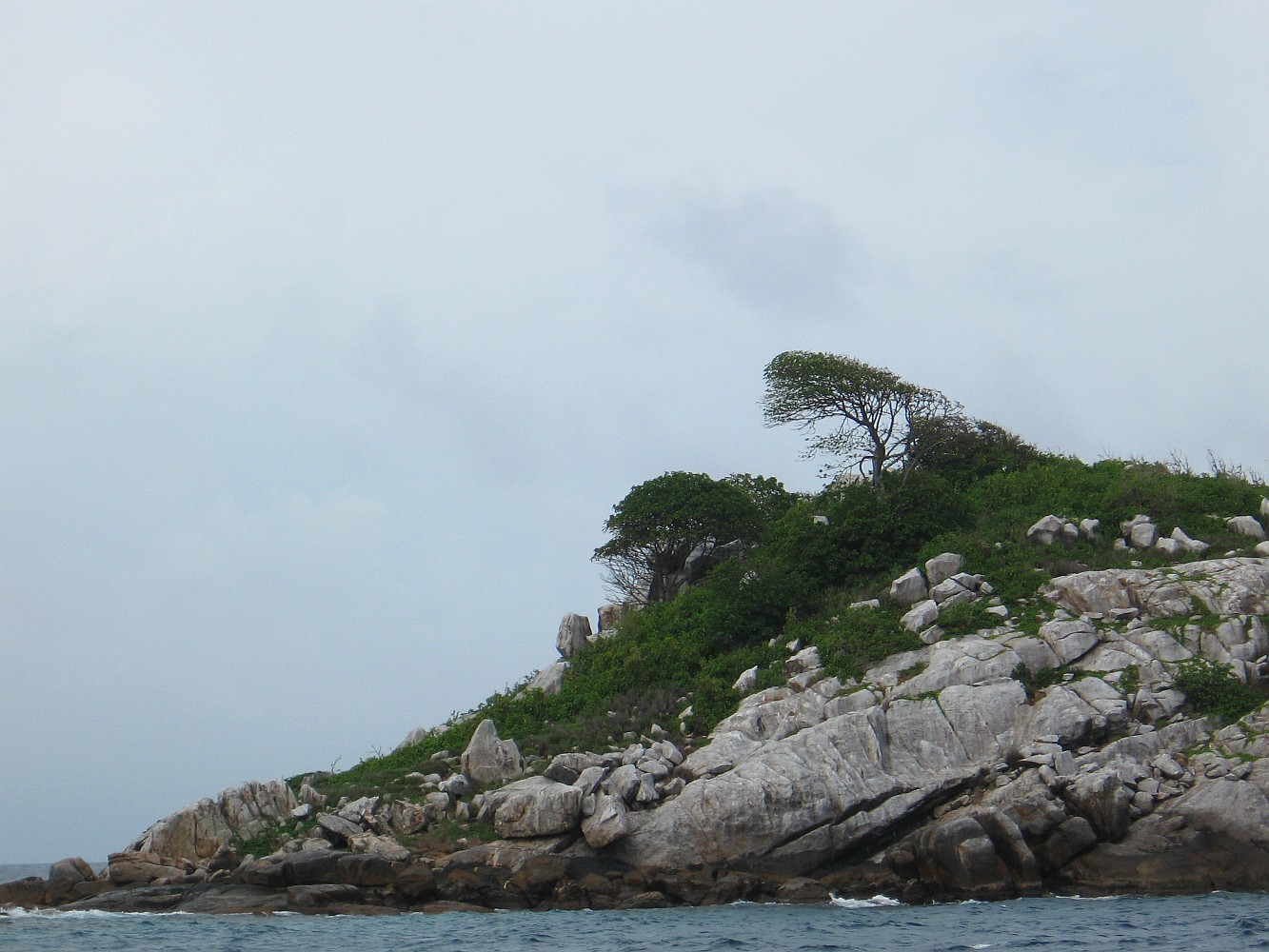
