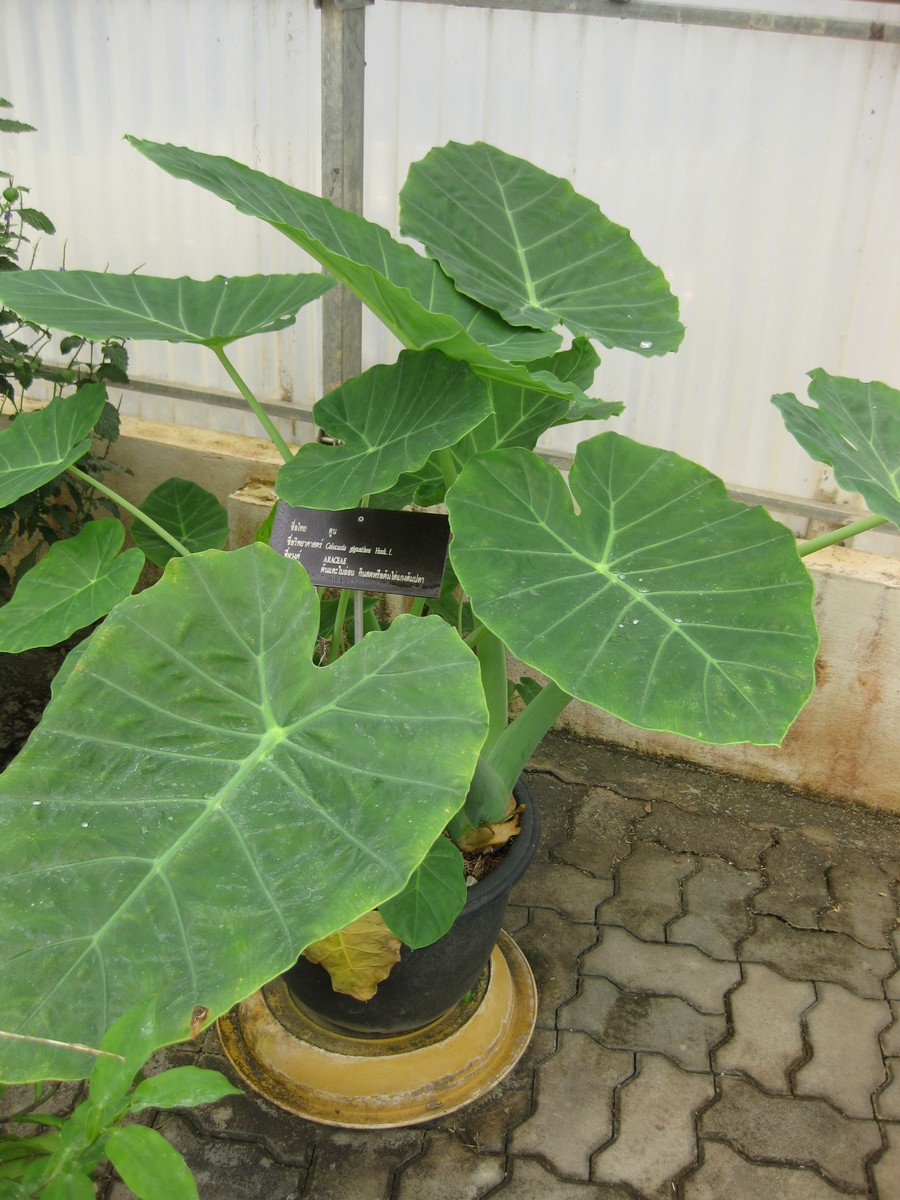

Scientific classification
- Kingdom: Plantae
- Clade: Tracheophytes
- Clade: Angiosperms
- Clade: Monocots
- Order: Alismatales
- Family: Araceae
- Subfamily: Aroideae
- Tribe: Colocasieae
- Genus: Leucocasia; Schott (1857)
- Species: L. gigantea

Binomial name
- Leucocasia gigantea (Blume) Schott (1857)

Synonyms
- Caladium giganteum Blume (1823); Colocasia gigantea (Blume) Hook.f. (1893); Arisaema fouyou H.Lév. (1914); Colocasia prunipes K.Koch & C.D.Bouché (1855)

= Leucocasia gigantea =

Species of flowering plant

Leucocasia gigantea, also called the giant elephant ear or Indian taro, is a species of flowering plant. It is a 1.5–3 m (4 ft 11 in – 9 ft 10 in) tall aroid plant with a large, fibrous corm, producing at its apex a whorl of thick, green leaves. It is the sole species in genus Leucocasia.

== Cultivation ==
Leucocasia gigantea is a "sister species" to another widely-cultivated 'taro', Colocasia esculenta, as well as to the alocasias, such as the large Alocasia macrorrhizos; it is speculated that L. gigantea was created as a result of natural hybridization between A. macrorrhizos and C. esculenta. It is called 'dọc mùng' in northern Vietnam and 'môn bạc hà' or 'bạc hà' in some provinces in southern Vietnam.

In Japanese, it is commonly called ハス芋 (hasu-imo), or "lotus yam". It is known as ryukyu in Kōchi Prefecture, as it is found in the Ryukyu Kingdom.

== Uses ==
In addition to its value as a starchy root vegetable—known by many names, such as taro, or arbi (in Hindi)—the plant’s leaf stalk (petiole) is also used as a vegetable in some areas of Southeastern Asia and Japan. It is sometimes used as an ingredient in miso soup, chanpurū and sushi.
