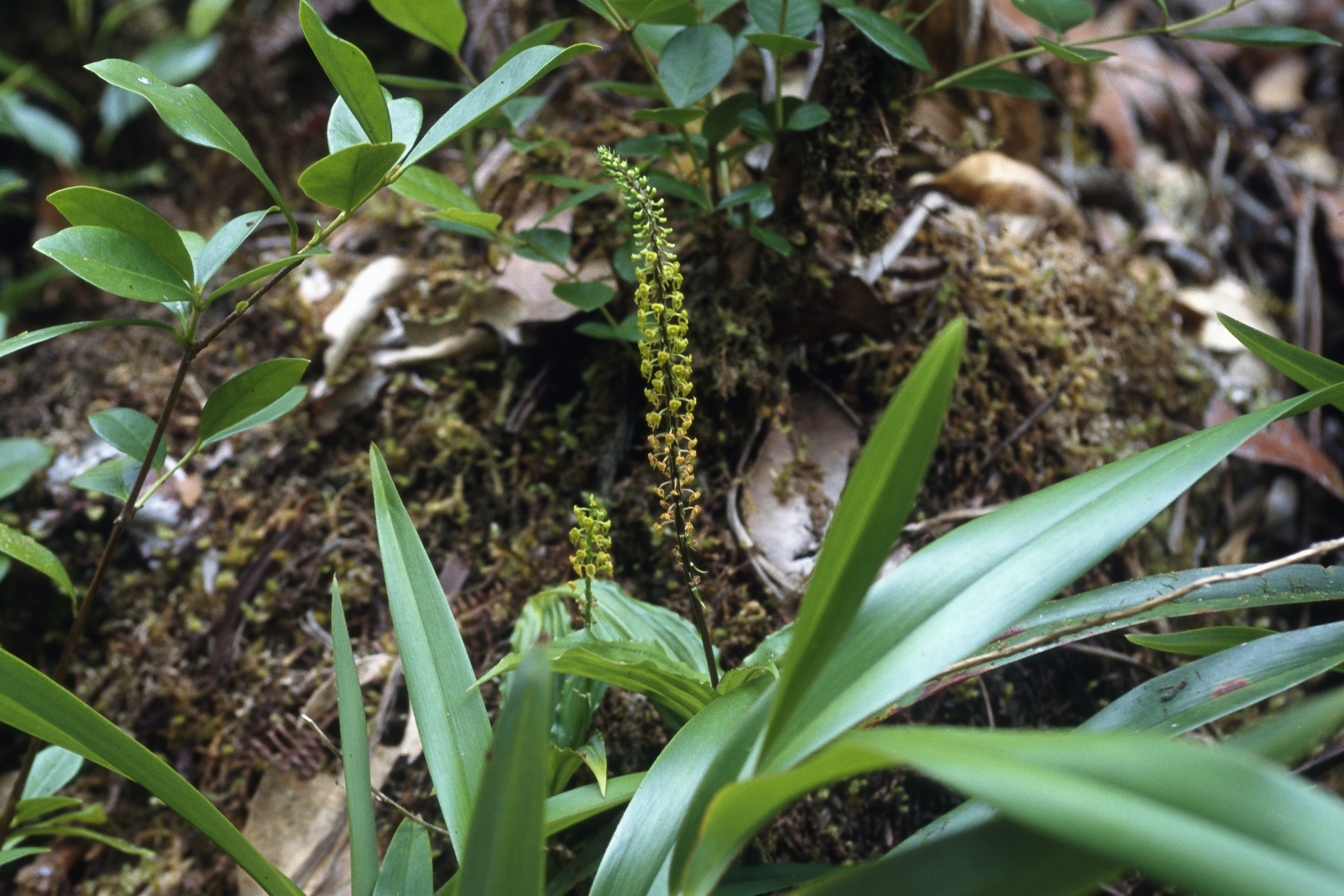
- M. seychellarum photographed on the island of Mahé, Seychelles

Conservation status
- Vulnerable (IUCN 3.1)
- CITES Appendix II

Scientific classification
- Kingdom: Plantae
- Clade: Tracheophytes
- Clade: Angiosperms
- Clade: Monocots
- Order: Asparagales
- Family: Orchidaceae
- Subfamily: Epidendroideae
- Genus: Malaxis
- Species: M. seychellarum

Binomial name
- Malaxis seychellarum (Kraenzl.) Summerh.

Synonyms
- Liparis seychellarum Kraenzl.; Microstylis seychellarum (Kraenzl.) Schltr.; Microstylis thomassetii Rolfe; Seidenfia seychellarum (Kraenzl.) Szlach.

= Malaxis seychellarum =

Species of orchid

Malaxis seychellarum is a species of orchid endemic to the Seychelles Islands in the Indian Ocean. First described in 1902, it is now considered a vulnerable species.

== Taxonomy and history ==
This species was first described in 1902 by German botanist Friedrich Wilhelm Ludwig Kraenzlin as Liparis seychellarum, placing it in the genus Liparis. Kraenzlin's description was based on a type specimen collected by fellow German botanist Andreas Schimper, who visited the Seychelles in 1898 as a member of the Valdivia expedition. Another German botanist, Rudolf Schlechter, transferred this species to the genus Microstylis (now a synonym of Malaxis) in 1915. English botanist Robert Allen Rolfe would posthumously describe this species in 1922 under the name Microstylis thomassetii based on type material collected in 1901. Fellow English botanist V. S. Summerhayes listed Rolfe's name as a junior synonym of Microstylis seychellarum in 1931, and would later transfer this species to the genus Malaxis in 1953. Polish botanist Dariusz Szlachetko moved this species into the genus Seidenfia in 1995, however, this change was not widely accepted, and Seidenfia seychellarum is considered a junior synonym of Malaxis seychellarum.

== Distribution and habitat ==
Malaxis seychellarum is restricted to the islands of Mahé and Silhouette in the Seychelles, where it occurs in montane forests dominated by Dillenia and Northea trees at altitudes of 400–750 m (1,310–2,460 ft). It grows in damp humus or on mossy rocks, trees, and tree ferns in shaded areas.

== Description ==
Malaxis seychellarum is a medium to large plant growing 10–33 cm (3.9–13.0 in) tall. The pseudobulbs are stem-like and bulbous at the base, measuring 5–8 cm (2.0–3.1 in) long and 1–2 cm (0.39–0.79 in) in diameter. Each pseudobulb is covered with two or three overlapping stem-sheaths and bears two to five leaves starting half way up the stem. The leaves are thin, elliptic to ovate-elliptic in shape, measuring 7–20 cm (2.8–7.9 in) long and 2.5–7 cm (0.98–2.76 in) wide. The leaves may be green or purplish-green. The inflorescence is erect, measuring up to 30 cm (12 in) long and densely packed with up to 50 flowers that open in succession. The flowers are small, measuring approximately 5 mm (0.20 in) by 6 mm (0.24 in), and variable in colour, ranging from yellow to green to purple.

== Ecology ==
Malaxis seychellarum is capable of growing as an epiphyte, lithophyte, or as a terrestrial plant in humus-rich soils. It appears to flower year-round, though the primary flowering season lasts from November to May.

== Conservation status ==
Malaxis seychellarum is listed as vulnerable on the International Union for Conservation of Nature's Red List under criteria B1ab(iii), B2ab(iii), and D2, based on its restricted area of occupancy, the number of locations at which this species is present, and the risk of habitat degradation. M. seychellarum is present within protected national parks, however, invasive species and climate change threaten its habitat.
