= Syzygium wrightii =

Conservation status
- Vulnerable (IUCN 3.1)

Scientific classification
- Kingdom: Plantae
- Clade: Tracheophytes
- Clade: Angiosperms
- Clade: Eudicots
- Clade: Rosids
- Order: Myrtales
- Family: Myrtaceae
- Genus: Syzygium
- Species: S. wrightii

Binomial name
- Syzygium wrightii (Baker) A.J.Scott

Synonyms
- Eugenia wrightii Baker; Eugenia sechellarum Baker

Species of plant

Syzygium wrightii is a species of flowering plant in the family Myrtaceae. It is a shrub or tree endemic to Seychelles. It is known from the Granitic Seychelles islands of Mahé, Praslin, Silhouette, Curieuse, Félicité, Grand Soeur and Marianne. It grows on exposed rocky outcrops and as an understory tree in forests, from near sea level to 900 metres elevation, with the best-developed populations from 100 to 400 metres elevation. Its seeds are eaten and likely dispersed by frugivores.

It is threatened by habitat loss from settlements, agriculture, and other human developments in its primary habitat, and competition from introduced species such as Cinnamomum verum and Alstonia macrophylla. The IUCN Red List assesses the species as Vulnerable.

The species was first described as Eugenia wrightii by John Gilbert Baker in 1876. In 1980 Andrew John Scott placed the species in genus Syzygium as S. wrightii.
