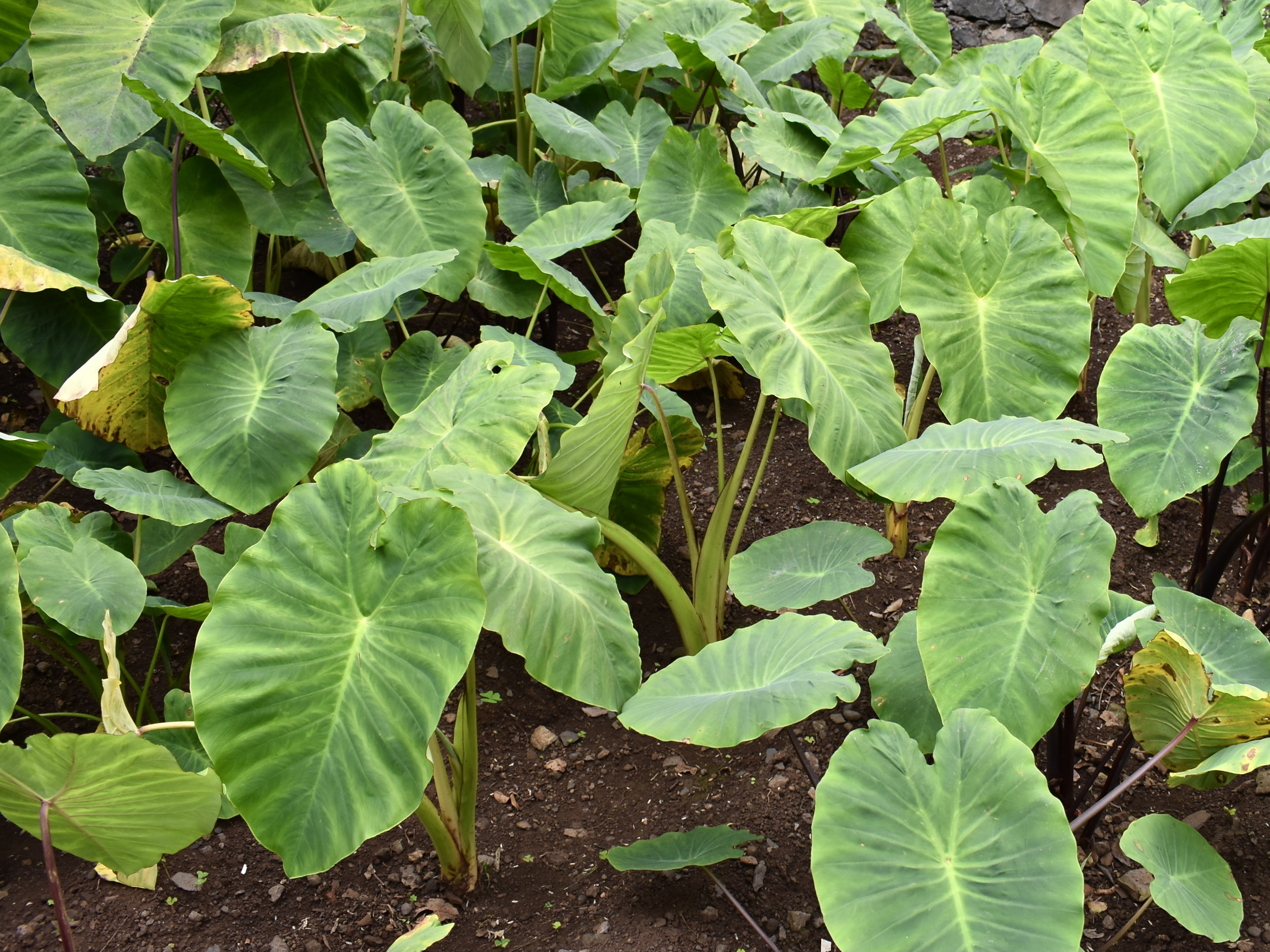
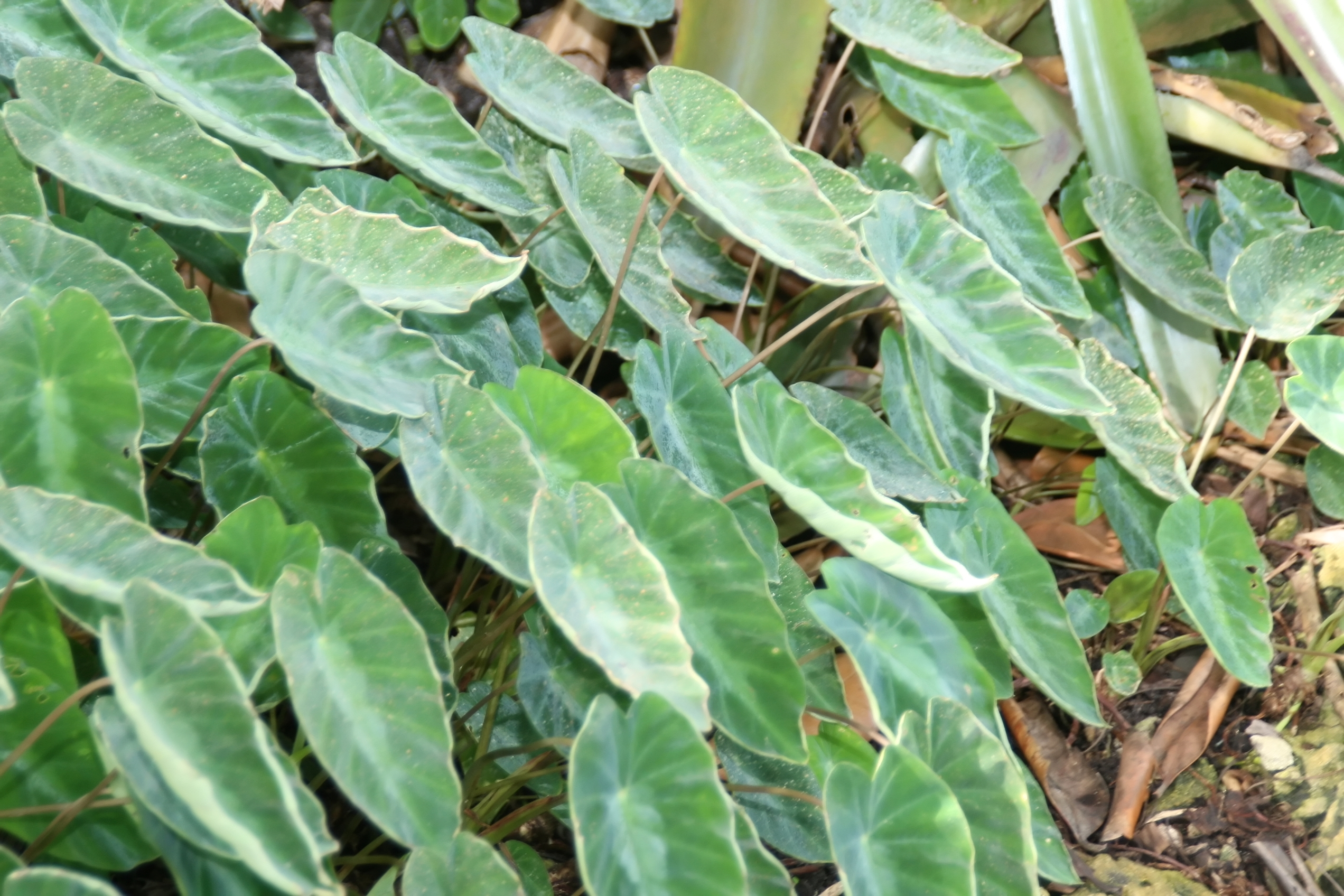
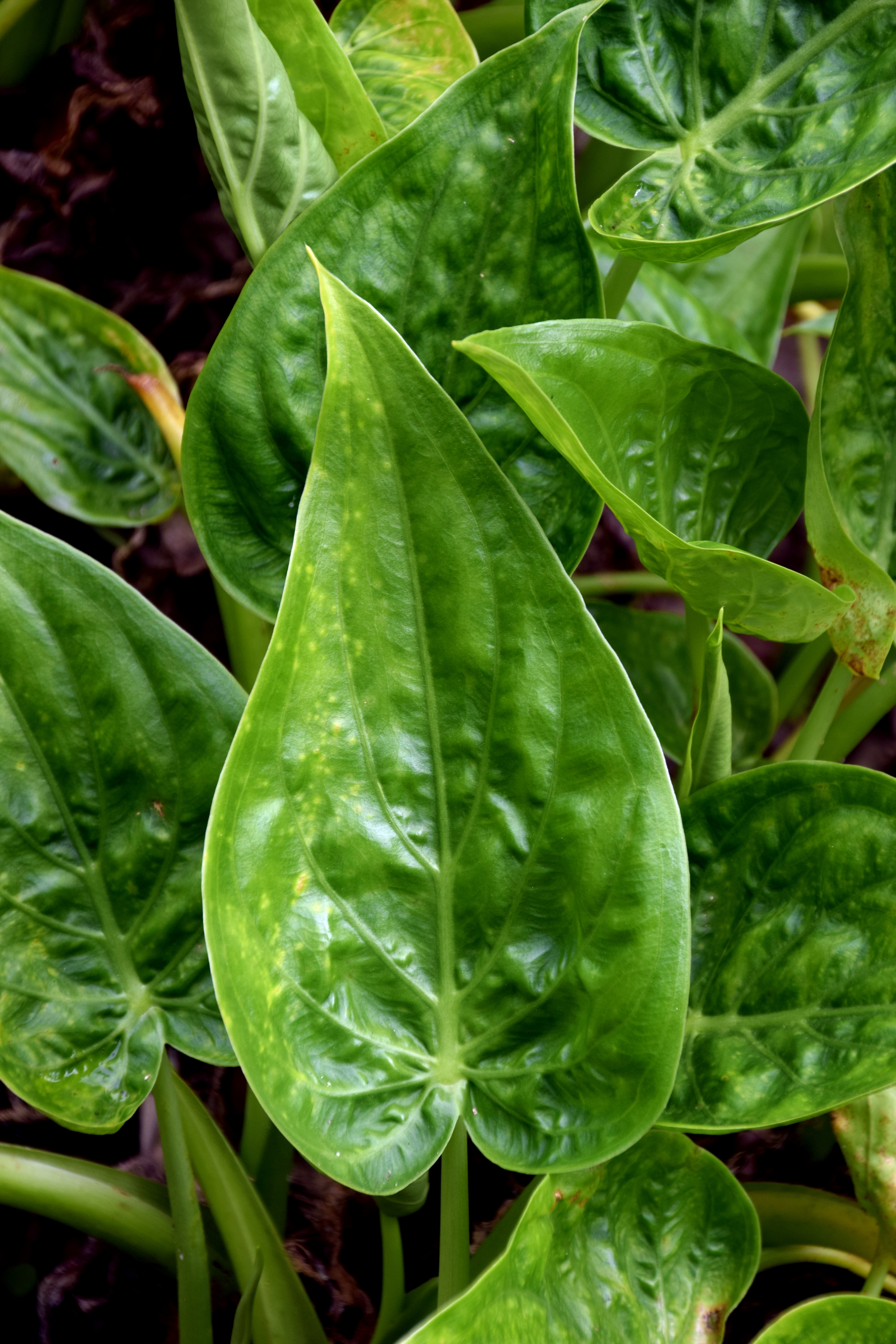
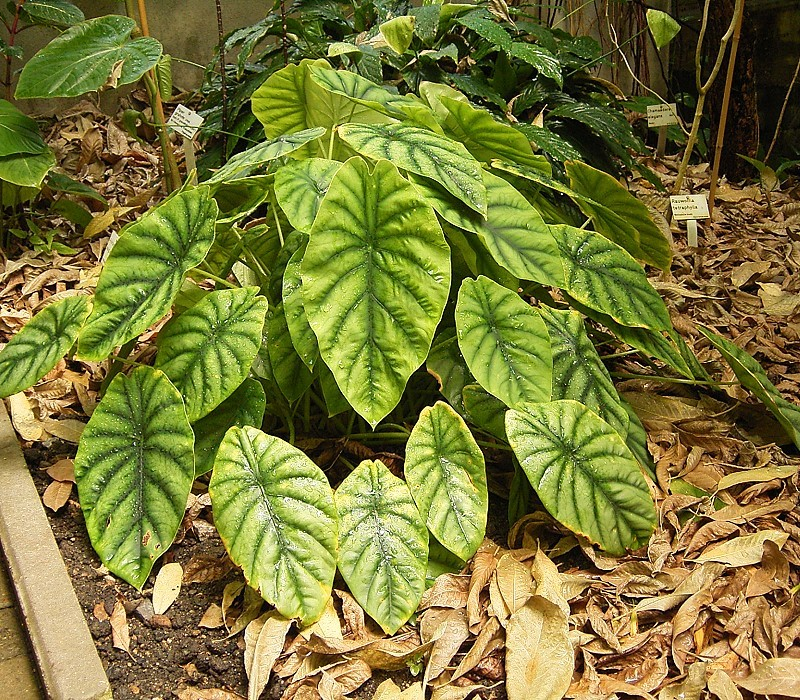
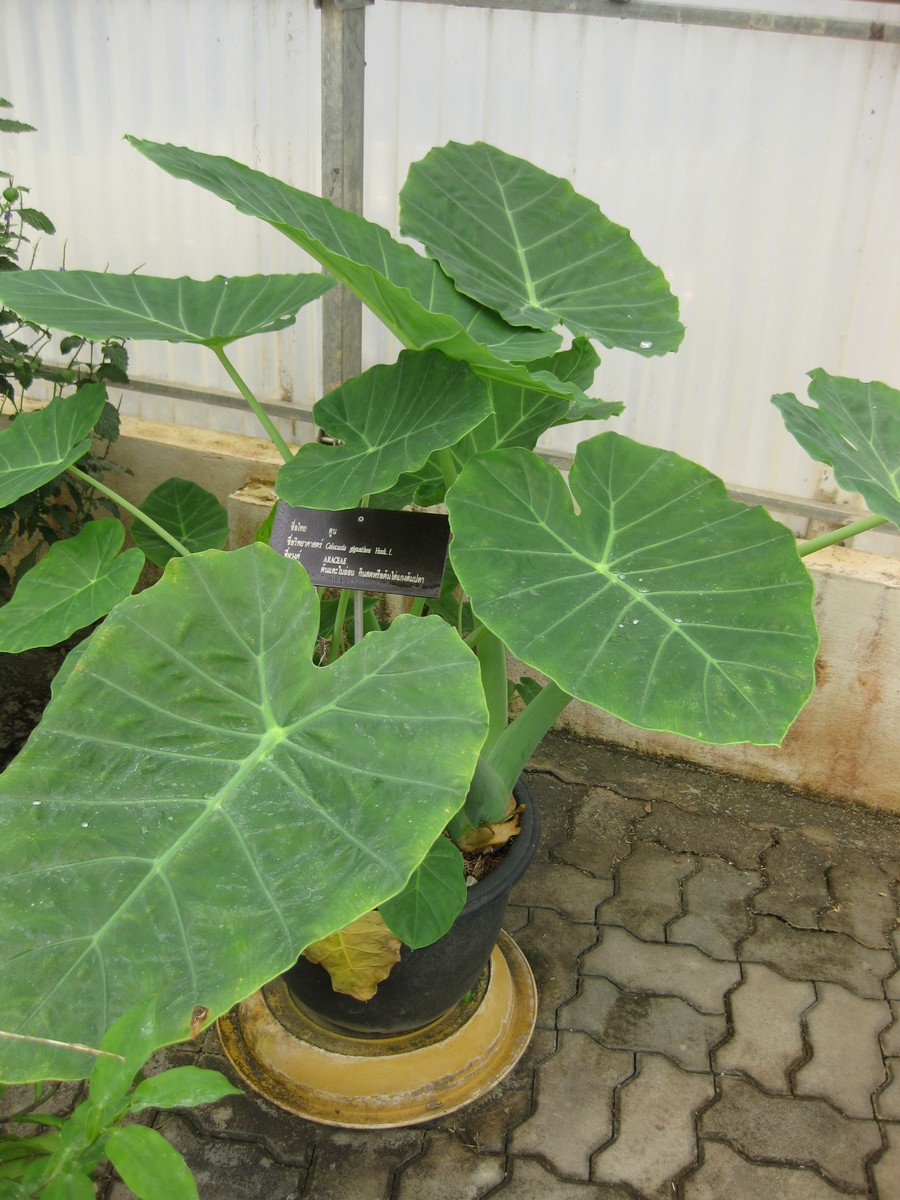
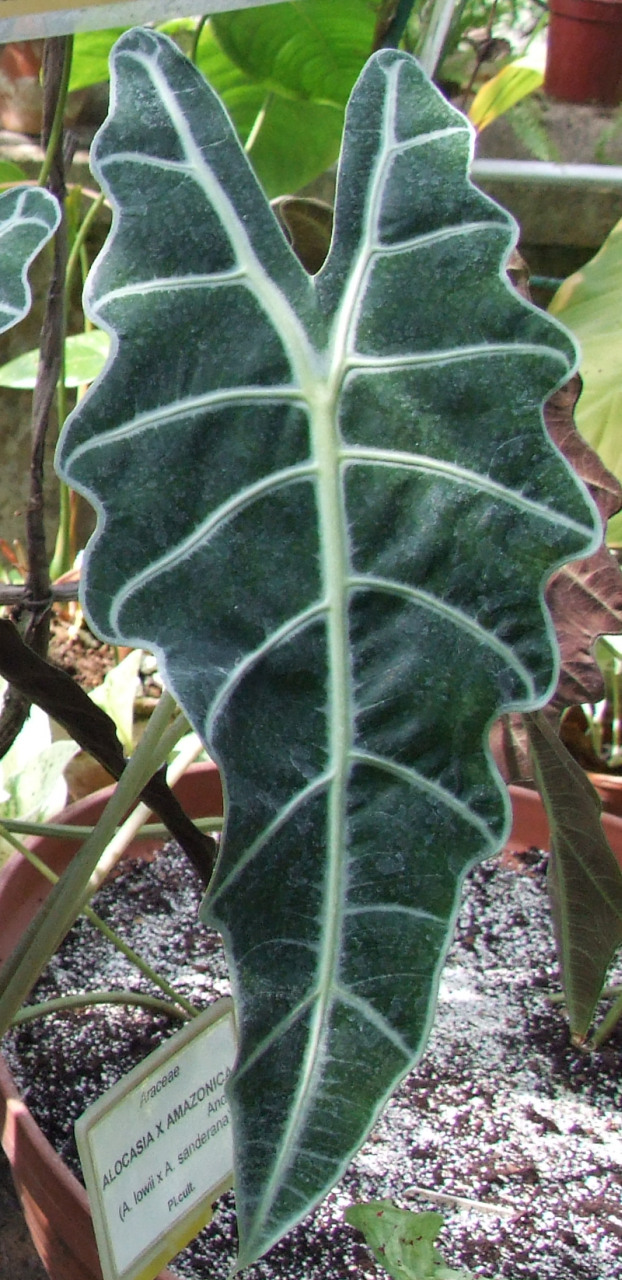
- Diversity of Colocasieae

Scientific classification
- Kingdom: Plantae
- Clade: Tracheophytes
- Clade: Angiosperms
- Clade: Monocots
- Order: Alismatales
- Family: Araceae
- Subfamily: Aroideae
- Tribe: Colocasieae; Bremer

= Colocasieae =

Subfamily of flowering plants

Colocasieae is a tribe of flowering plants in the family Araceae.

This tribe of plants is notable for including various large-leafed, ornamental, and sometimes edible plants, the edible ones mostly being harvested for their corms.

== Genera ==
1. Alocasia - Subtropical Asia and eastern Australia
2. Ariopsis Nimmo
3. Colocasia Schott - SE Asia and Indian subcontinent, some species have been naturalized in other tropical and subtropical regions.
4. Leucocasia Schott (monotypic) - Vietnam, Japan and Indian subcontinent
5. Protarum Engl.
6. Remusatia Schott
7. Steudnera K. Koch
8. Vietnamocasia N. S. Lý et al.
