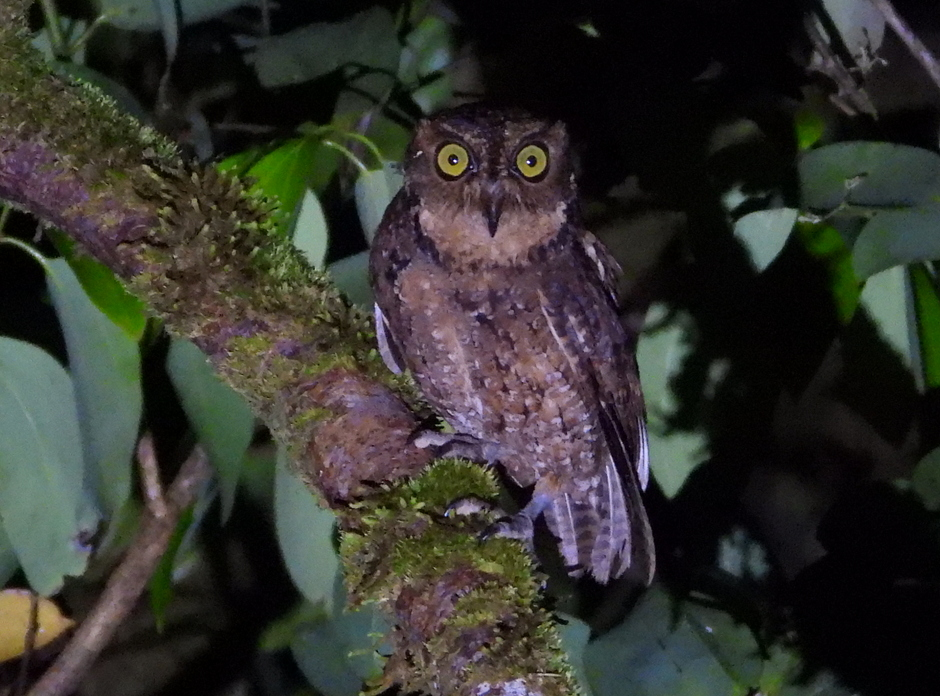

Conservation status
- Critically Endangered (IUCN 3.1)
- CITES Appendix II

Scientific classification
- Kingdom: Animalia
- Phylum: Chordata
- Class: Aves
- Order: Strigiformes
- Family: Strigidae
- Genus: Otus
- Species: O. insularis

Binomial name
- Otus insularis (Tristram, 1880)

= Seychelles scops owl =

Species of owl

The Seychelles scops owl or Seychelles owl (Otus insularis), also known as bare-legged scops owl or syer (in Creole) is a rare scops owl species, which only occurs in the Morne Seychellois National Park on the Seychelles island of Mahé.

== Description ==
It reaches a length of 19 to 21 cm. The wings are each about 17 cm long. Its plumage is rufous brown and exhibits black shaft streaks. The underparts and the facial disc are rufous. The long grey legs are unfeathered. The eyes are large and golden yellow. The ear-tufts are very small. Its call, which sounds like a rasping "whaugh" with various "tok tok" notes, can be heard from a far distance and in particular in the darkness. Its diet consists of geckos, tree frogs and insects (e.g. locusts).

== Status ==
The range of this bird when first described in 1880 were the Seychelles islands of Praslin, Mahé, and Silhouette Island. Due to the clearing of the mountainous cloud forests and introduced alien animals, like rats, cats, and barn owls the population had dropped so drastically that it was thought to be extinct by 1906. In 1959 it was rediscovered by French naturalist Phillippe Loustau-Lalanne in a mountainous cloud forest at an altitude of 200 m (660 ft) a.s.l. on the island of Mahé.

In 1999 the first nest was discovered but there was no breeding success. In 2000 the first infrared photograph was shot of a female with her juvenile. Due to the lack of information about the population this species was long regarded as critically endangered by the IUCN. Due to the discovery of further populations, it was noted by 2002 that the population was stable at about 318 individuals. The population is likely declining and by 2020 it was estimated at 200-280 individuals.
