= Erythroxylum sechellarum =

Conservation status
- Least Concern (IUCN 3.1)

Scientific classification
- Kingdom: Plantae
- Clade: Embryophytes
- Clade: Tracheophytes
- Clade: Angiosperms
- Clade: Eudicots
- Clade: Rosids
- Order: Malpighiales
- Family: Erythroxylaceae
- Genus: Erythroxylum
- Species: E. sechellarum

Binomial name
- Erythroxylum sechellarum O.Schulz

Species of flowering plant

Erythroxylum sechellarum is a species of plant in the Erythroxylaceae family. It is endemic to Seychelles.

It is a small shrub that can grow up to 6 meters high, the reddish-orange young shoot leaves are typical of Erythroxylum sechellarum. It is found on Curieuse, La Digue, Mahé and Praslin. Locally it is called Kafe maron pti fey in the Seychelles.
