= Glionnetia =

Conservation status
- Endangered (IUCN 3.1)

Scientific classification
- Kingdom: Plantae
- Clade: Tracheophytes
- Clade: Angiosperms
- Clade: Eudicots
- Clade: Asterids
- Order: Gentianales
- Family: Rubiaceae
- Subfamily: Ixoroideae
- Genus: Glionnetia; Tirveng.
- Species: G. sericea

Binomial name
- Glionnetia sericea (Baker) Tirveng.

Synonyms
- Ixora sericea Baker; Randia sericea (Baker) Hemsl.

Species of plant

Glionnetia is a monotypic genus of flowering plants in the family Rubiaceae. The genus contains only one species, viz. Glionnetia sericea, which is endemic to Mahé and Silhouette Island in the Seychelles. The species thrives mainly on high ridges in the mountains and it does not seem to grow well at lower altitudes. Glionnetia sericea is a small flower with paniculate terminal inflorescences and it has capsules that are dispersed by wind.
