= Polyscias crassa =

Conservation status
- Vulnerable (IUCN 3.1)

Scientific classification
- Kingdom: Plantae
- Clade: Tracheophytes
- Clade: Angiosperms
- Clade: Eudicots
- Clade: Asterids
- Order: Apiales
- Family: Araliaceae
- Genus: Polyscias
- Species: P. crassa

Binomial name
- Polyscias crassa (Hemsl.) Lowry & G.M.Plunkett

Synonyms
- Gastonia crassa (Hemsl.) Friedm.; Indokingia crassa Hemsl.

Species of flowering plant

Polyscias crassa is a species of plant in the family Araliaceae. It is endemic to Seychelles. It is threatened by habitat loss.
