= Paragenipa =

Scientific classification
- Kingdom: Plantae
- Clade: Tracheophytes
- Clade: Angiosperms
- Clade: Eudicots
- Clade: Asterids
- Order: Gentianales
- Family: Rubiaceae
- Genus: Paragenipa; Baill. (1879)
- Species: P. lancifolia

Binomial name
- Paragenipa lancifolia (Bojer ex Baker) Tirveng. & Robbr. (1985)

Synonyms
- Paragenipa cervorum Baill. (1879); Paragenipa wrightii (Baker) F.Friedmann (1994); Pyrostria lancifolia Bojer ex Baker (1877); Psychotria wrightii Baker (1877); Randia lancifolia (Bojer ex Baker) Hemsl. (1916); Uragoga wrightii (Baker) Kuntze (1891)

Genus of plants

Paragenipa lancifolia is a species of flowering plant belonging to the family Rubiaceae. It is a shrub or tree endemic to the Seychelles. It is the sole species in genus Paragenipa.
