= Curieuse Island =

Island & national park in the Seychelles

Nickname: Ile Rouge
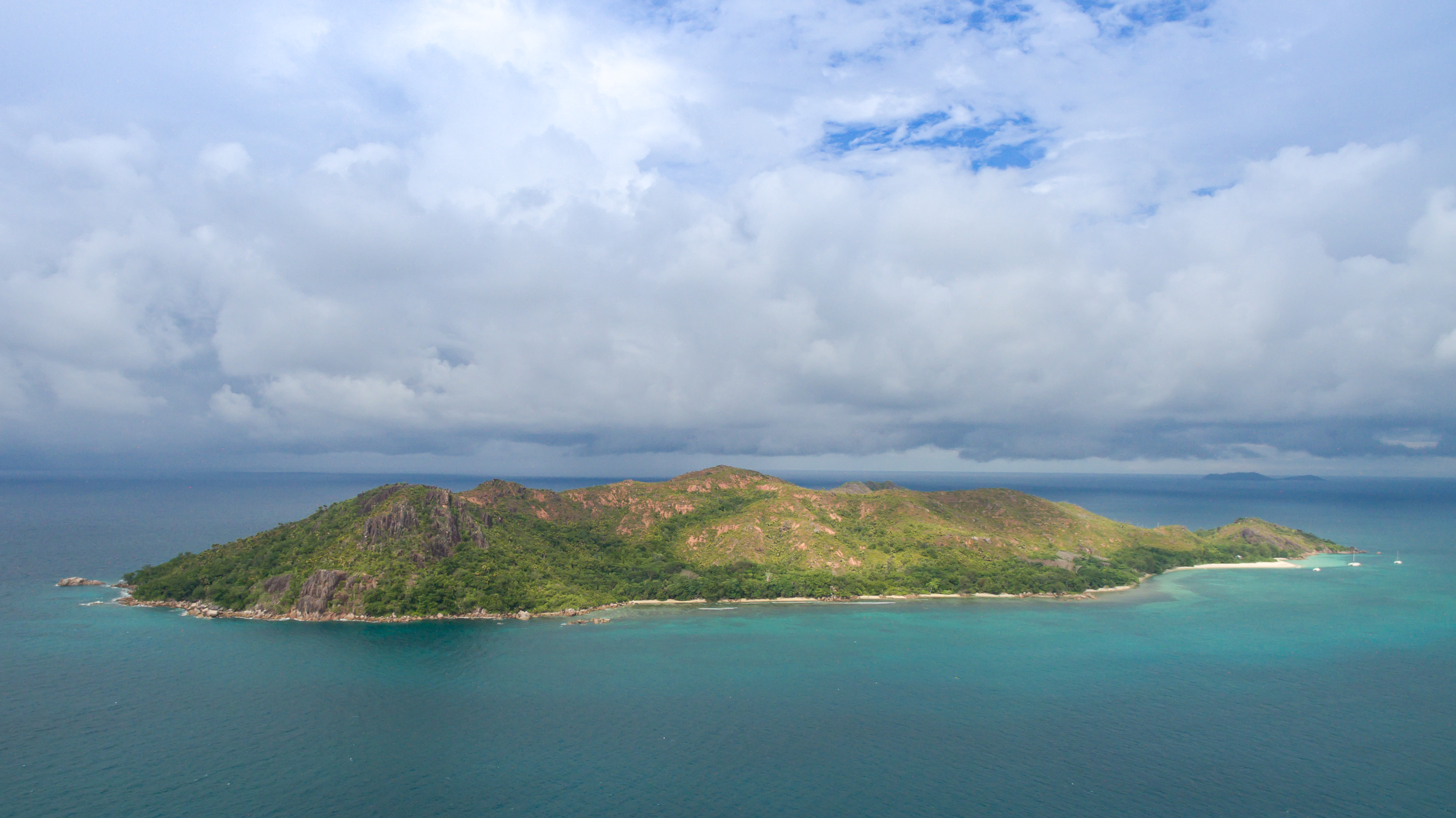
- Aerial of Curieuse island

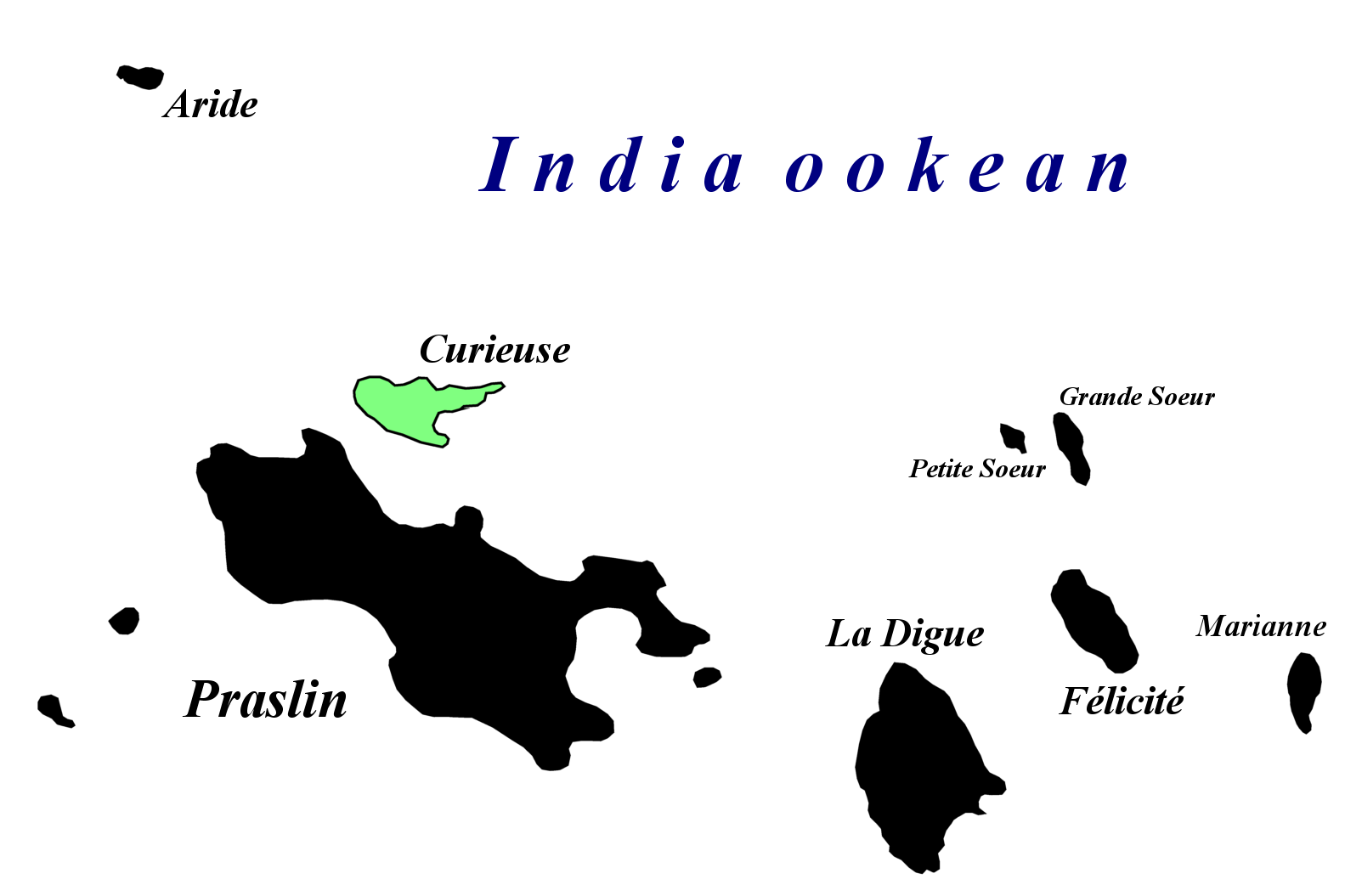
- Curieuse Island is to the north of Praslin

- Location in Seychelles

Geography
- Location: Seychelles, Indian Ocean
- Coordinates: 4°17′00″S 55°43′25″E
- Archipelago: Inner Islands, Seychelles
- Adjacent to: Indian Ocean
- Total islands: 1
- Major islands: Curieuse
- Area: 2.93 km^{2} (1.13 sq mi)
- Length: 3.6 km (2.24 mi)
- Width: 1.6 km (0.99 mi)
- Coastline: 11.5 km (7.15 mi)
- Highest elevation: 172 m (564 ft)
- Highest point: Mont Curieuse

Administration
- Seychelles
- Group: Inner Islands
- Sub-Group: Granitic Seychelles
- Sub-Group: Praslin Islands
- Districts: Baie Sainte Anne
- Largest settlement: Park rangers station (pop. 7)

Demographics
- Population: 7 (2014)
- Pop. density: 2.4/km^{2} (6.2/sq mi)
- Ethnic groups: Creole, French, East Africans, Indians.

Additional information
- Time zone: SCT (UTC+4)
- ISO code: SC-07
- Official website: www.seychelles.travel/en/discover/the-islands/

Curieuse Island is a small granitic island 1.13 sq mi (2.9 km^{2}) in the Seychelles close to the north coast of the island of Praslin. Curieuse is notable for its bare red earth intermingled with the unique coco de mer palms, one of the cultural icons of the Seychelles, only growing on the two neighboring islands.

== History ==
Originally named "Ile Rouge" due to its red coloured soil. In 1768 the French claimed possession of the island, naming it after the schooner "La Curieuse", a ship that was under the command of explorer Marc-Joseph Marion du Fresne. Like a number of islands in the Seychelles, there was a native giant tortoise population that was quickly extirpated.

In 1829, Curieuse was first used as a leper colony, and it functioned in this capacity until 1965. This helped protect the ecosystem from human influence. Today, ruins of the leprosarium remain, as well as the former physician's residence at Anse St. Joseph (now an educational center and museum).

== Conservation ==
In 1967 a fire destroyed much of the vegetation on the island, including more than 150 coco de mer palms. Following this event, the government took ownership of the island and introduced various restoration and conservation projects.

In 1979, Curieuse and surrounding waters were declared the Curieuse Marine National Park in order to protect the native wildlife. Between 1978 and 1982, a conservation project relocated Aldabra giant tortoise from Aldabra to Curieuse. Today, it is the home of more than 300 Aldabra giant tortoise, some staying around the Ranger's Station and the rest roaming around elsewhere on the island.

On the southern part of the island is a mangrove swamp that is traversed by a walkway for park visitors. The island is also known for coco de mer palms, giant takamaka trees, a large hawksbill turtle rookery and several bird species, such as the rare Seychelles black parrot Coracopis nigra barklyi, a parrot found only here and on Praslin. Though black parrots are found here, no breeding has been recorded. Instead it is recorded in the mature palm forests of Praslin. Among the plant species on the island, several are native and endemic to Curieuse; porcher (Cordia subcordata), bois chandelle (Dracaena), Lalyann dile (Secamone schimperiana), bwa bannann (Gastonia sechellarum) and bois cassant de bord mer (Guettarda speciosa)

There is also currently a satellite camp for the Seychelles branch of Global Vision International, a volunteer group that focuses on conservation of the island and surveys local fish, coral, turtle and coco de mer numbers.

== Image gallery ==
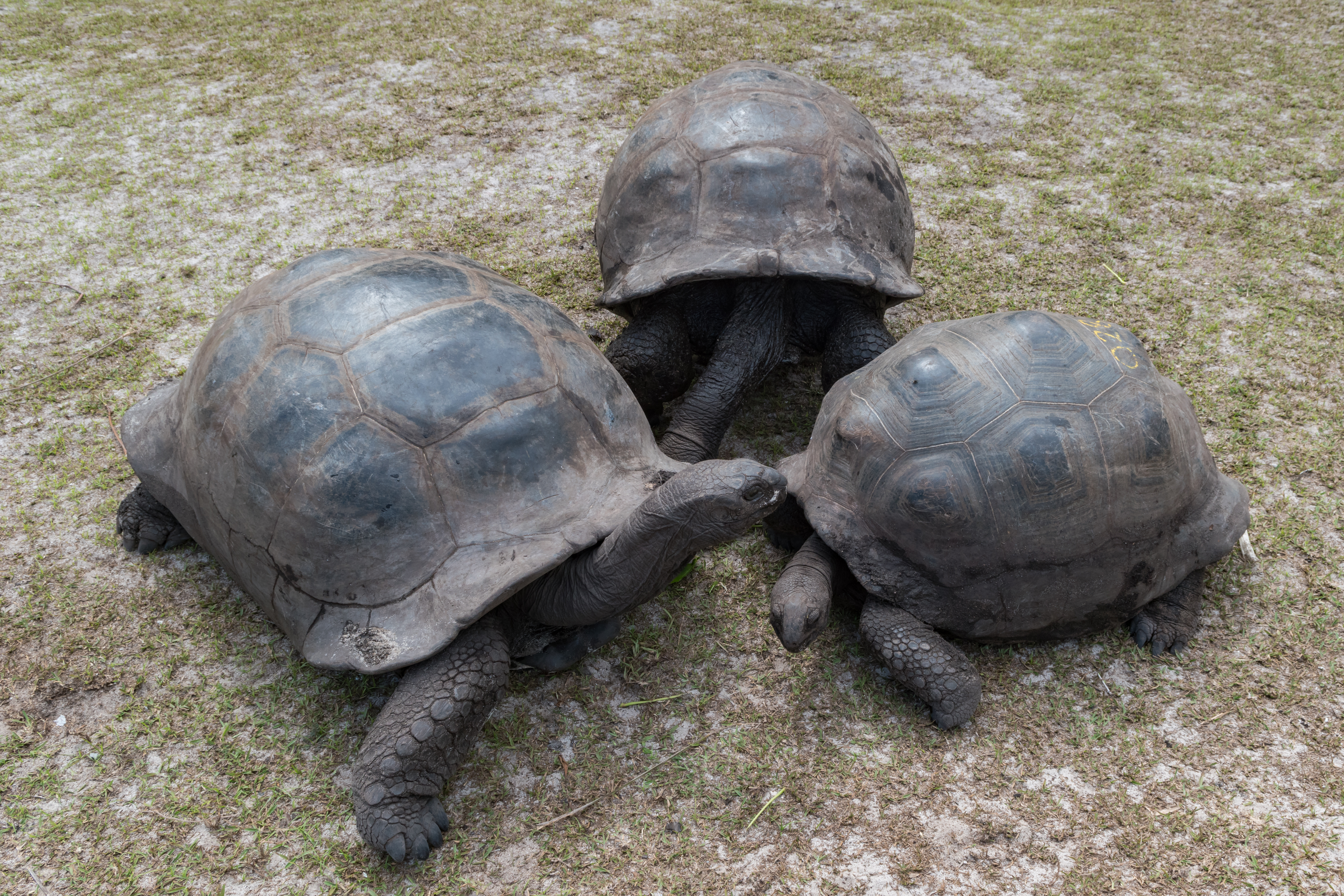
Tortoises on Curieuse island

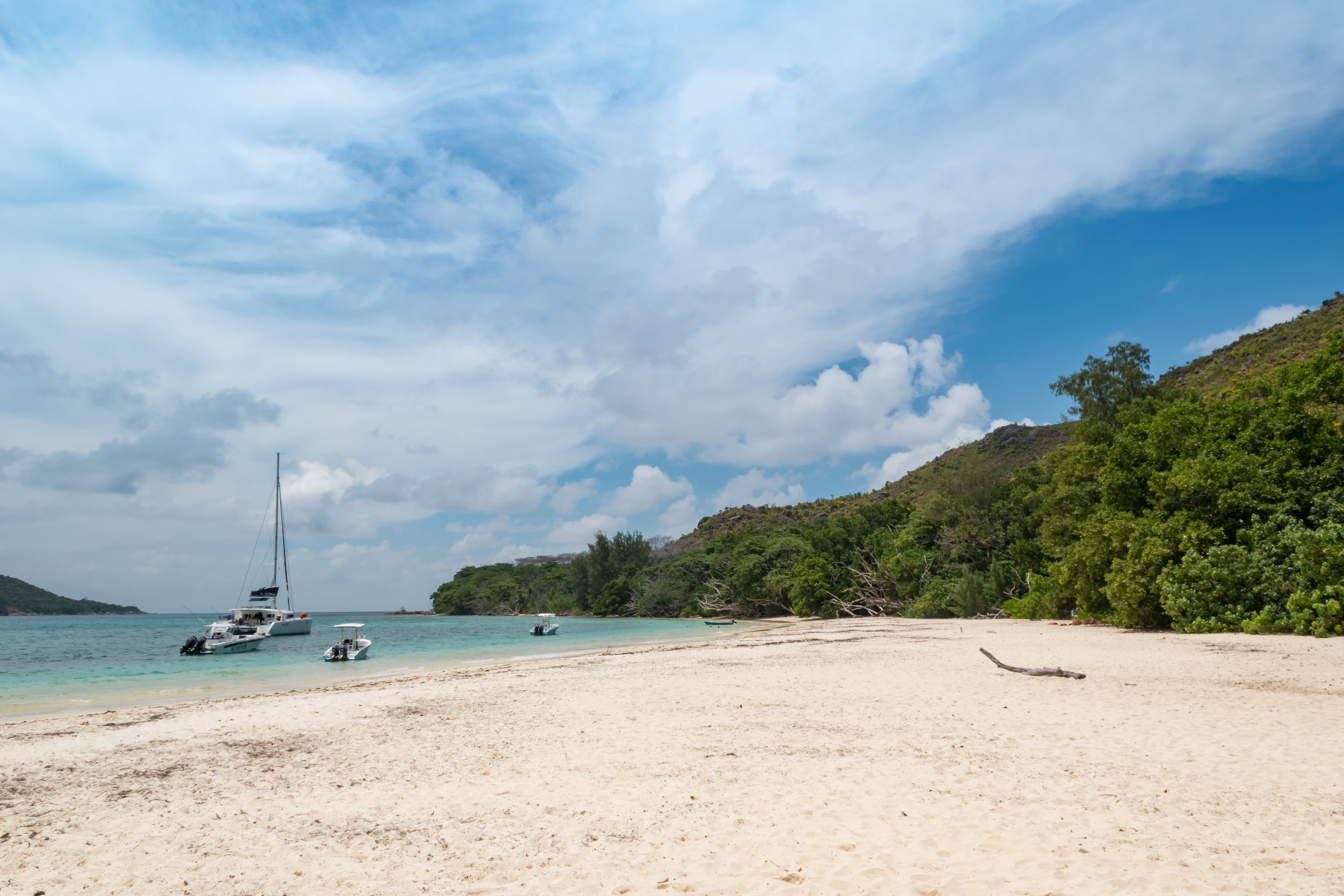
Beach on Curieuse island, Seychelles

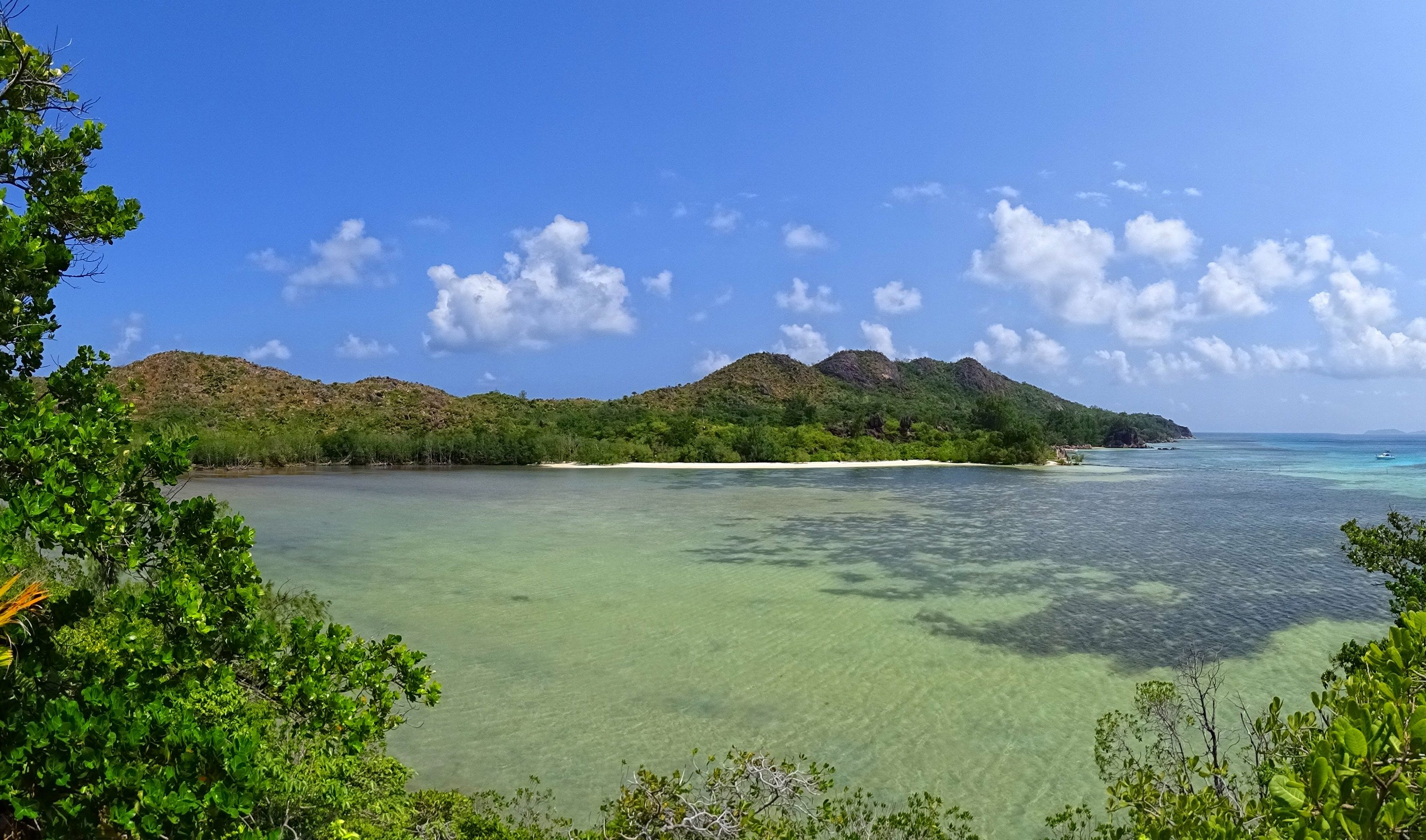
Laraie Bay on Curieuse

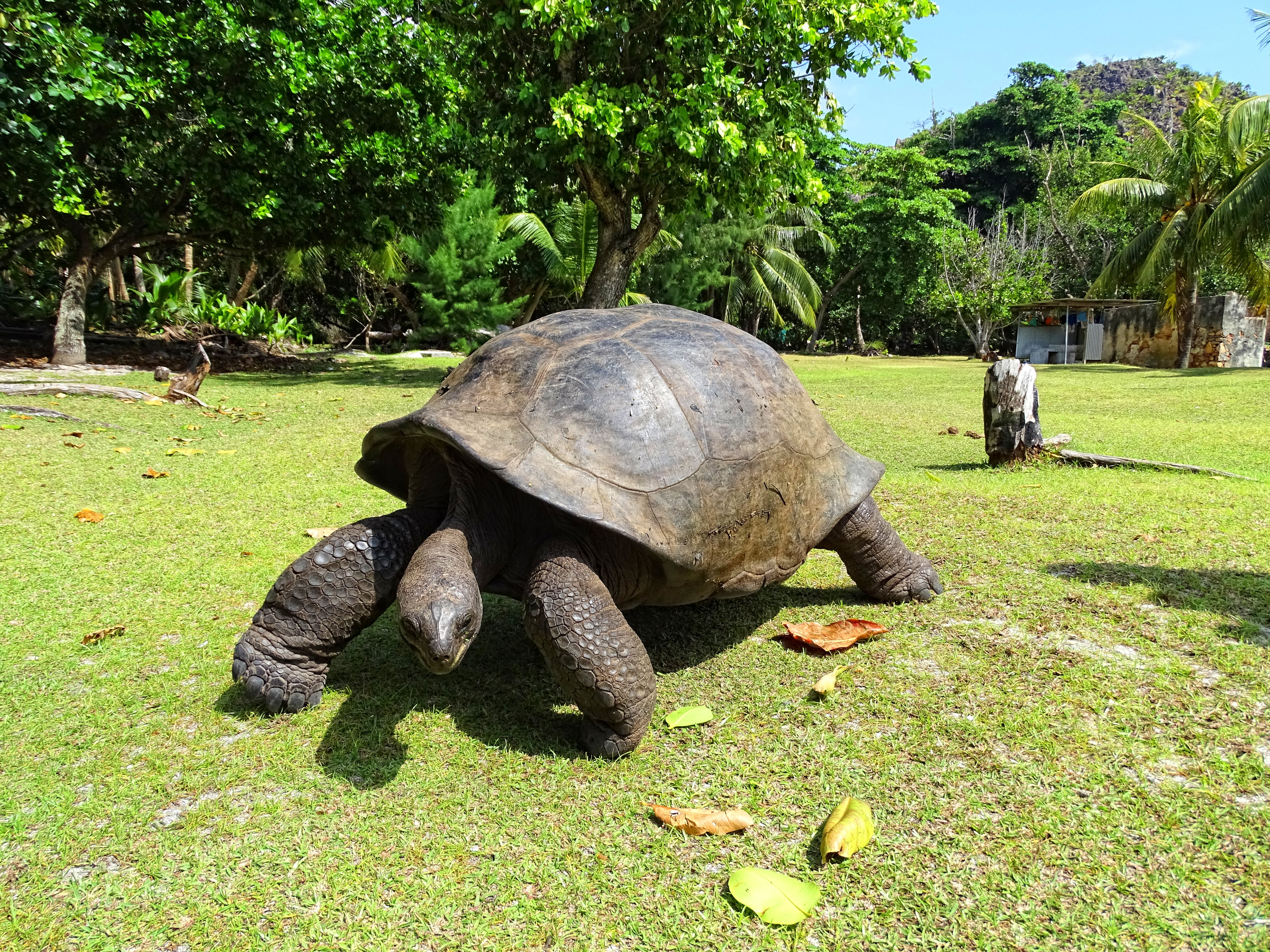
Aldabra giant tortoise living in Curieuse Marine National Park

Map of Seychelles

Map of Praslin

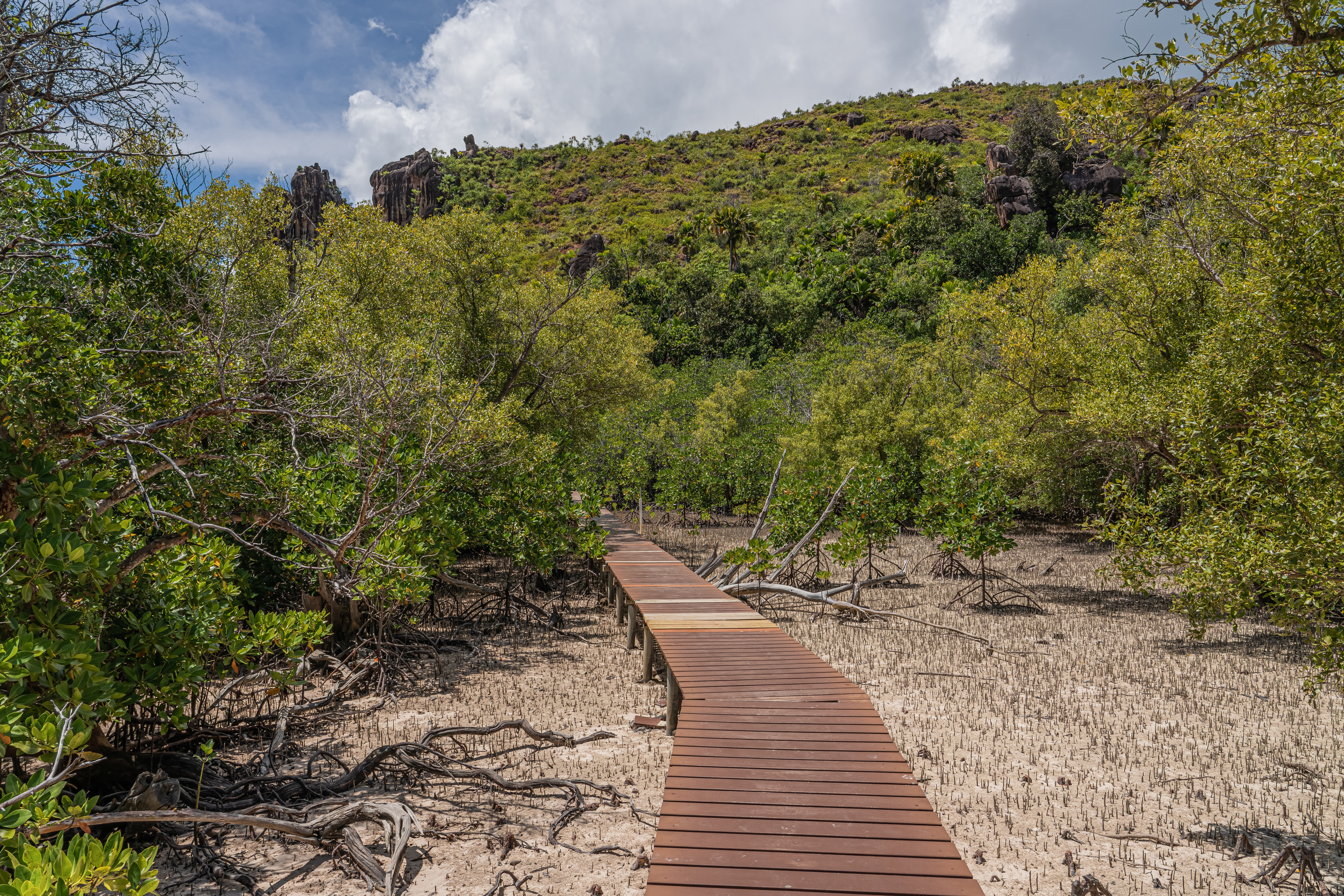
Mangroves on Curieuse
