= Xyroschoenus =

Conservation status
- Least Concern (IUCN 3.1)

Scientific classification
- Kingdom: Plantae
- Clade: Tracheophytes
- Clade: Angiosperms
- Clade: Monocots
- Clade: Commelinids
- Order: Poales
- Family: Cyperaceae
- Genus: Xyroschoenus; Larridon (2018)
- Species: X. hornei

Binomial name
- Xyroschoenus hornei (C.B.Clarke) Larridon (2018)

Synonyms
- Costularia hornei (C.B.Clarke) Kük. (1938); Lophoschoenus hornei (C.B.Clarke) Stapf (1914); Schoenus hornei C.B.Clarke (1894), nom. cons.; Tetraria hornei (C.B.Clarke) T.Koyama (1961)

Genus of flowering plants

Xyroschoenus hornei is a species of flowering plant belonging to the family Cyperaceae. It is a perennial sedge endemic to the Seychelles. It is the sole species in genus Xyroschoenus. It is native to the islands of Mahé, Silhouette, Praslin, and Curieuse, where it grows in the forest understory.
