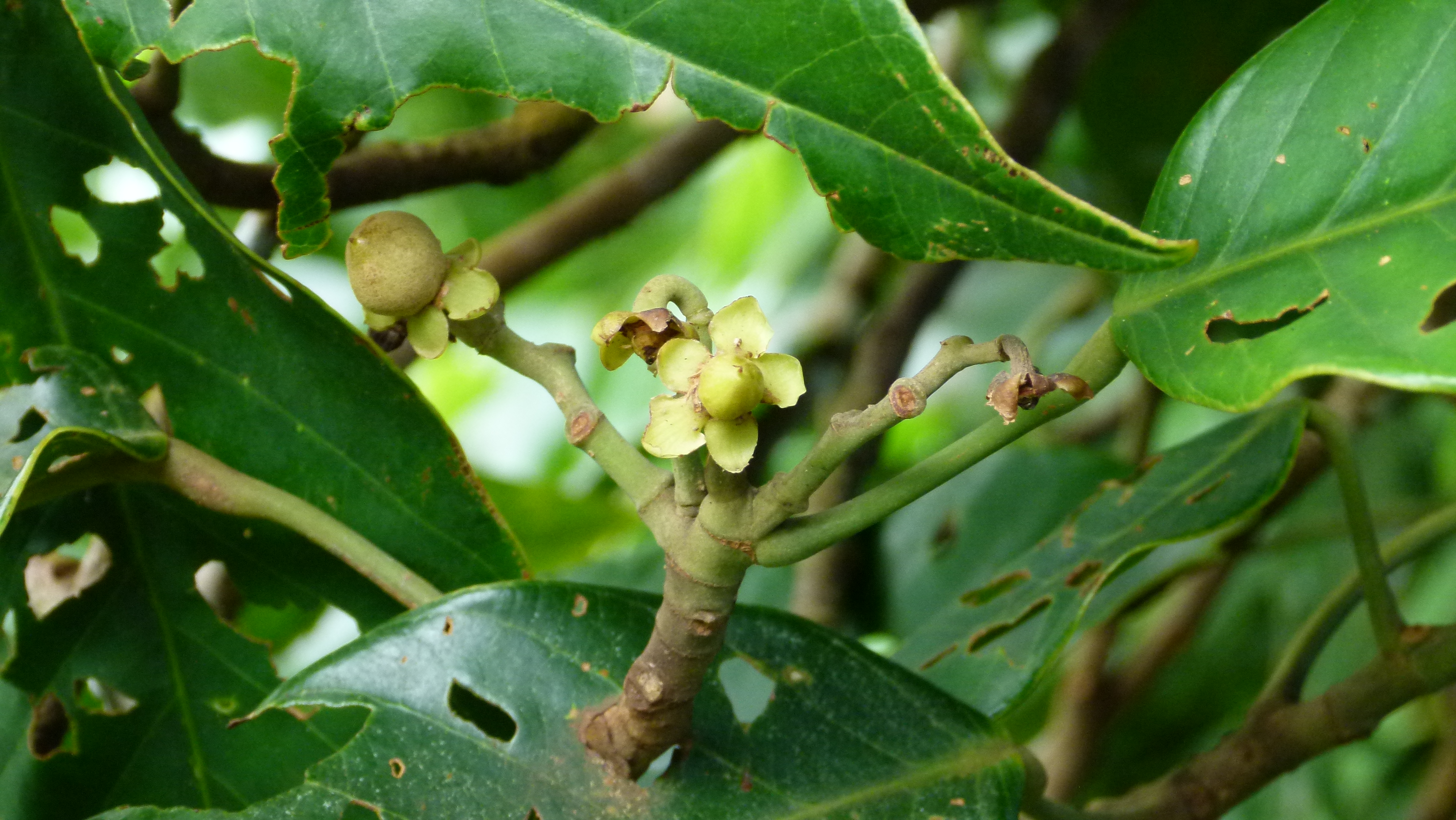

Conservation status
- Critically Endangered (IUCN 3.1)

Scientific classification
- Kingdom: Plantae
- Clade: Tracheophytes
- Clade: Angiosperms
- Clade: Eudicots
- Clade: Rosids
- Order: Malvales
- Family: Dipterocarpaceae
- Subfamily: Dipterocarpoideae
- Genus: Vateriopsis; F.Heim
- Species: V. seychellarum

Binomial name
- Vateriopsis seychellarum (Dyer) F.Heim

Synonyms
- Vateria seychellarum Dyer ex Baker

= Vateriopsis =

Genus of trees

Vateriopsis seychellarum is a species of plant in the family Dipterocarpaceae, and is the only species in the genus Vateriopsis. It is endemic to Seychelles. It has been labeled as a critically endangered species due to climate change.
