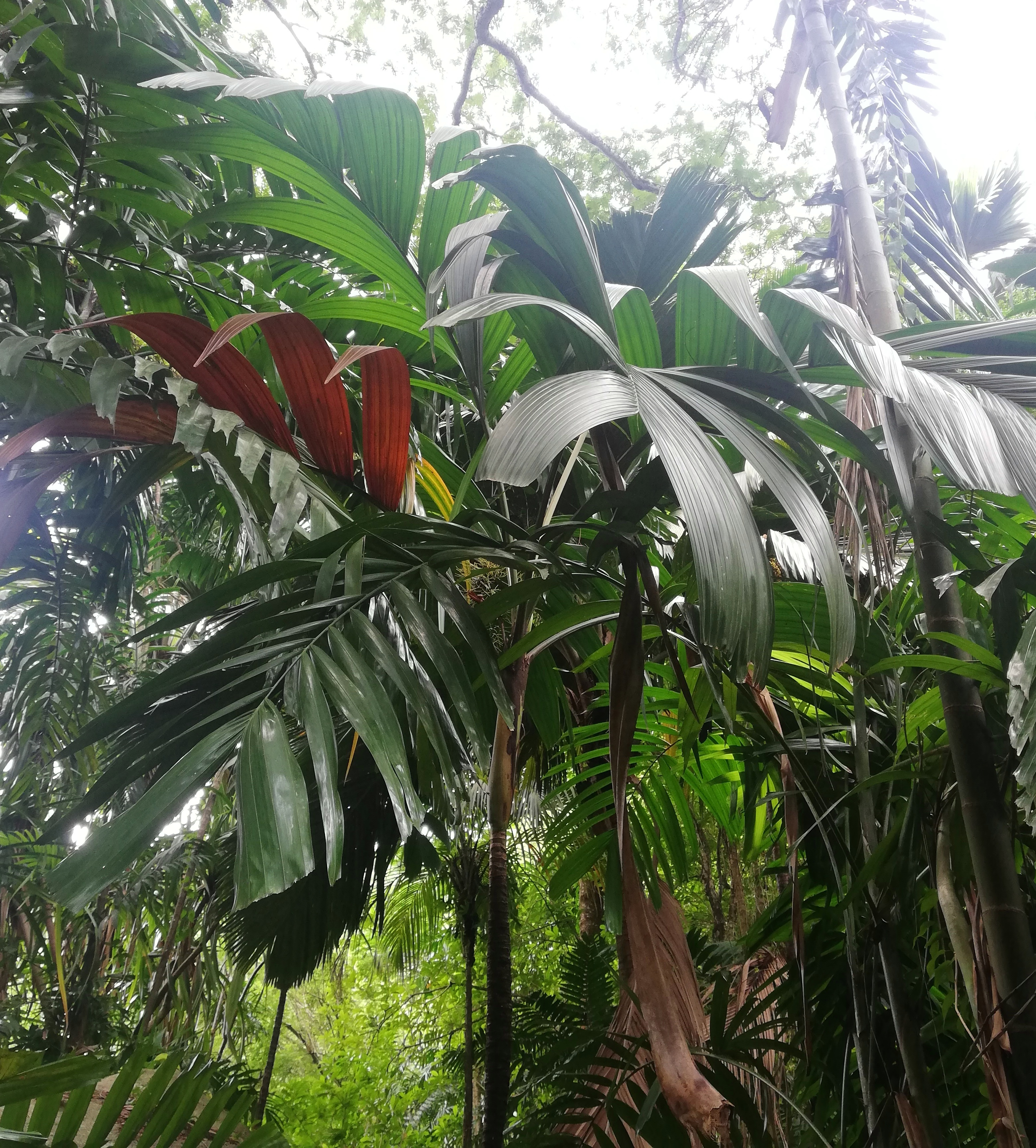

Conservation status
- Near Threatened (IUCN 3.1)

Scientific classification
- Kingdom: Plantae
- Clade: Tracheophytes
- Clade: Angiosperms
- Clade: Monocots
- Clade: Commelinids
- Order: Arecales
- Family: Arecaceae
- Subfamily: Arecoideae
- Tribe: Areceae
- Subtribe: Verschaffeltiinae
- Genus: Roscheria; H.Wendl. ex Balf.f.
- Species: R. melanochaetes

Binomial name
- Roscheria melanochaetes H.Wendl.

= Roscheria =

Species of plant

Roscheria is an endangered, monotypic genus of flowering plant in the palm family. The genus is named for Albrecht Roscher, a 19th-century German explorer, and the epithet for its single species R. melanochaetes derives from Latin and Greek meaning 'black' and 'bristle', alluding to the spines covering the trunks. They naturally occur on the Mahé and Silhouette Islands of Seychelles where they grow in mountainous rainforest and are threatened by habitat loss.

== Description ==
Roscheria melanochaetes is a slow-growing palm. The trunk reaches 8 m in height at 8 cm in diameter, usually straight, featuring distinctive rings near the crown. The trunks exhibit rings of black spines at each stem node, but this feature is most pronounced in young plants; as the plants age they grow fewer and fewer trunk spines, or none at all. Spines are also present on the crownshaft and petioles and these persist into maturity.

The crownshaft is 3 m tall, light green in color, covered in brown scales, especially nearing the top. The crownshaft bulges in its center and holds 12–16 pinnate leaves, 1–2 m long on 15–20 cm petioles. The leaves are distinct in that the individual leaflets exhibit enormous variation; some have a single rib while others have several. They can be broad, narrow, pointed apices, while others are obliquely truncated. The leaves are light to bright green on top and dull green to brown underneath; but for the bifid apices, juvenile leaves are undivided and pink to red in color.

Unlike most crown-shafted species, the inflorescence in R. melanochaetes emerges from the leaf axil rather than beneath the shaft. The much-branched panicle is 1–2 m with unisexual flowers of both sexes. Fruit matures to a 1 cm red drupe with one seed.

== Cultivation ==
These plants will not tolerate drought or cold. Growing naturally in rain forest understory, they also require shade when young, as well as moist, humus rich soil. These particulars usually make the plant difficult to cultivate, even in tropical areas.
