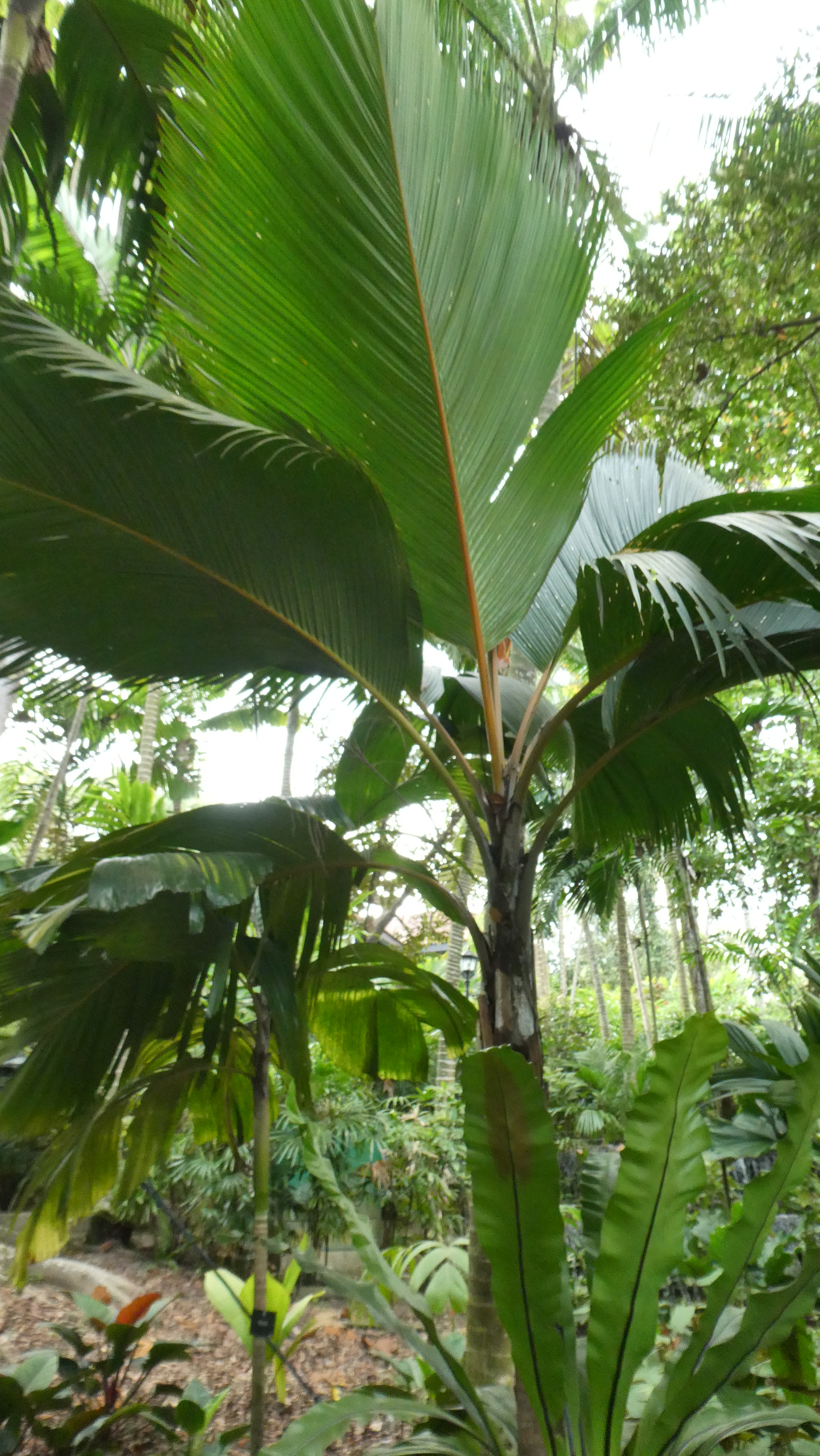
- Phoenicophorium borsigianum

Conservation status
- Least Concern (IUCN 3.1)

Scientific classification
- Kingdom: Plantae
- Clade: Tracheophytes
- Clade: Angiosperms
- Clade: Monocots
- Clade: Commelinids
- Order: Arecales
- Family: Arecaceae
- Subfamily: Arecoideae
- Tribe: Areceae
- Subtribe: Verschaffeltiinae
- Genus: Phoenicophorium; H.Wendl.
- Species: P. borsigianum

Binomial name
- Phoenicophorium borsigianum (K.Koch) Stuntz

= Phoenicophorium =

Genus of palms

Phoenicophorium, the thief palm, is a monotypic genus of flowering plant in the family Arecaceae. The sole species is Phoenicophorium borsigianum.

It is endemic to the Seychelles, being fairly widespread on the larger islands of the group, such as Mahé, Silhouette, Praslin, and La Digue.

It is found in forests, but is one of only a few native plants in the Seychelles that can colonise dry and eroded areas, as it is capable of withstanding full sunlight and periods of drought.

A palm growing in the Royal Botanic Gardens, Kew in 1857 was stolen, giving rise to the common name of 'thief palm'.

== Description ==
This palm is a fairly tall, solitary tree, with long leaves extending from the trunk. The stems are heavily ringed with leaf scars, formed by the loss of leaves, and bear black spines on younger plants.

The leaves can reach up to two metres in length; they have a crinkled appearance due to the prominent veins, and are split at the ends with orange-edged serrations.

The leaf stalks themselves may be up to half a metre long and are also armed with black spines. Both male and female flowers are borne on the same tree on an inflorescence that emerges below the crown. Small, oval fruits develop, which are orange in colour and may be up to 1.5 cm long.

The leaves of the thief palm provide shelter for geckos and invertebrates as the pleated surface acts as an effective litter trap thus providing cover for small animals. Locals use the large, dried leaves for thatching.

== Threats ==
This palm is adaptable and is able to colonise disturbed habitat; however, some populations may be threatened by fire (on Praslin), development, or invasive species. The harvesting of leaves is generally carried out in a semi-sustainable manner although local over-exploitation may occur.

== Conservation ==
Significant populations are protected in the Morne Seychellois National Park, and the Praslin National Park. The Silhouette Conservation Project of the Nature Protection Trust of Seychelles manages the substantial population on Silhouette where this species is used in active habitat restoration programmes.
