= Northia seychellana =

Conservation status
- Vulnerable (IUCN 2.3)

Scientific classification
- Kingdom: Plantae
- Clade: Tracheophytes
- Clade: Angiosperms
- Clade: Eudicots
- Clade: Asterids
- Order: Ericales
- Family: Sapotaceae
- Subfamily: Sapotoideae
- Genus: Northia; Hook.f.
- Species: N. seychellana

Binomial name
- Northia seychellana Hook.f.

Synonyms
- Northea Hook.f., spelling variation; Northia hornei Pierre; Mimusops hornei M.M.Hartog; Northia confusa Hemsl.; Northia brevitubulata Lecomte

Species of flowering plant

Northia is a genus of plants in the family Sapotaceae.

The name was first published by Joseph Dalton Hooker, in Hooker's Icones Plantarum (Sep 1884), in his description of Northia seychellana. The spelling was given as Northia on the plate, but the variant Northea in the text. Hooker gave the genus name in honour of the botanical illustrator and painter, Marianne North. It has very large seeds, up to 8 cm (3 in) long, and nearly as wide.

Northia seychellana (common name capucin) is the only species accepted in the genus. It is endemic to the Seychelles Islands. A few other species were formerly included in Northia but have been moved to Manilkara:

Formerly included

- Northia fasciculata - Manilkara fasciculata - Indonesia, Philippines, New Guinea
- Northia hoshinoi - Manilkara hoshinoi - Pohnpei
- Northia vitiensis - Manilkara vitiensis - Fiji
