= Praslin National Park and surrounding areas Important Bird Area =

National park in the Seychelles

Coordinates: 04°20′S 55°44′E

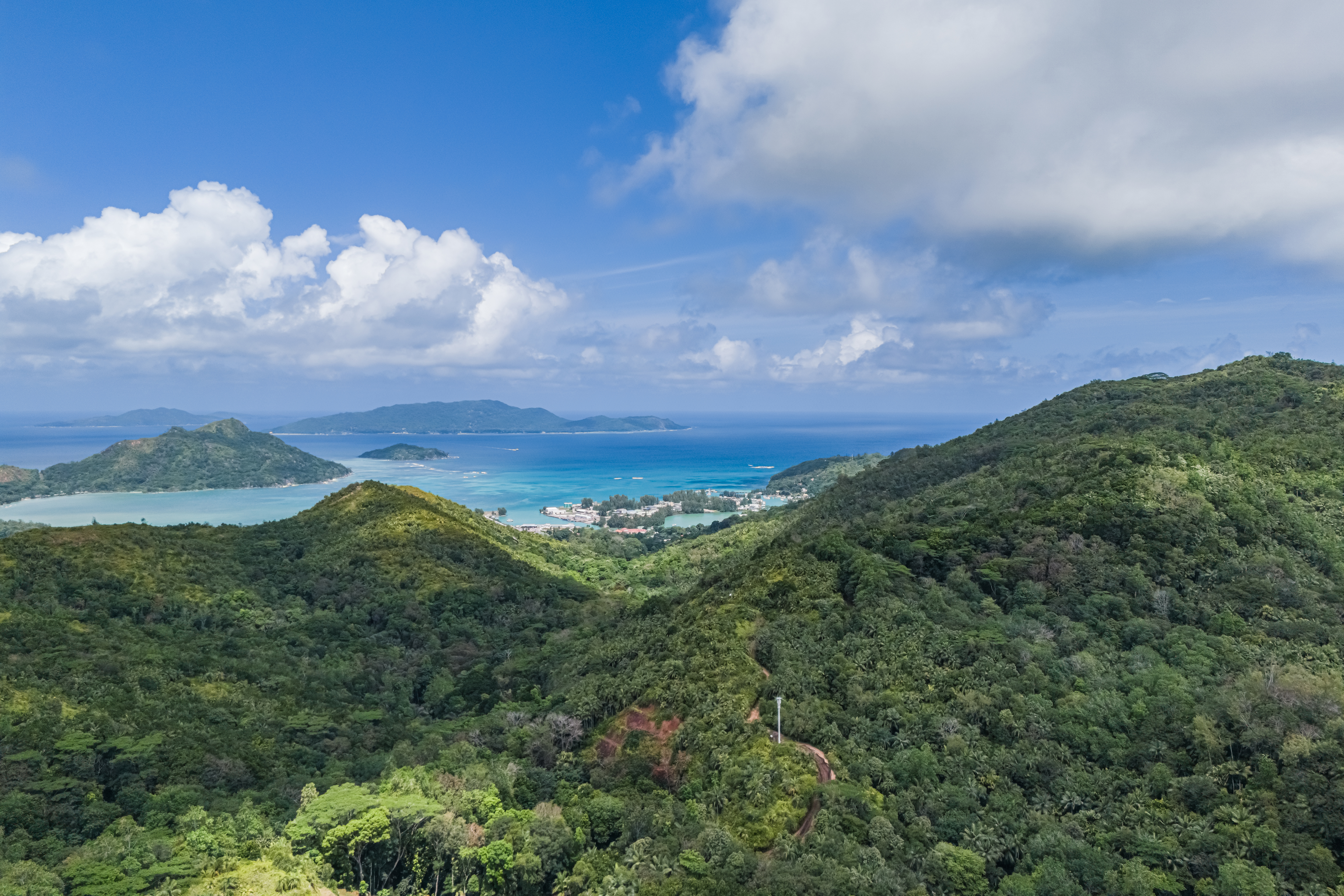
Aerial view of the National Park

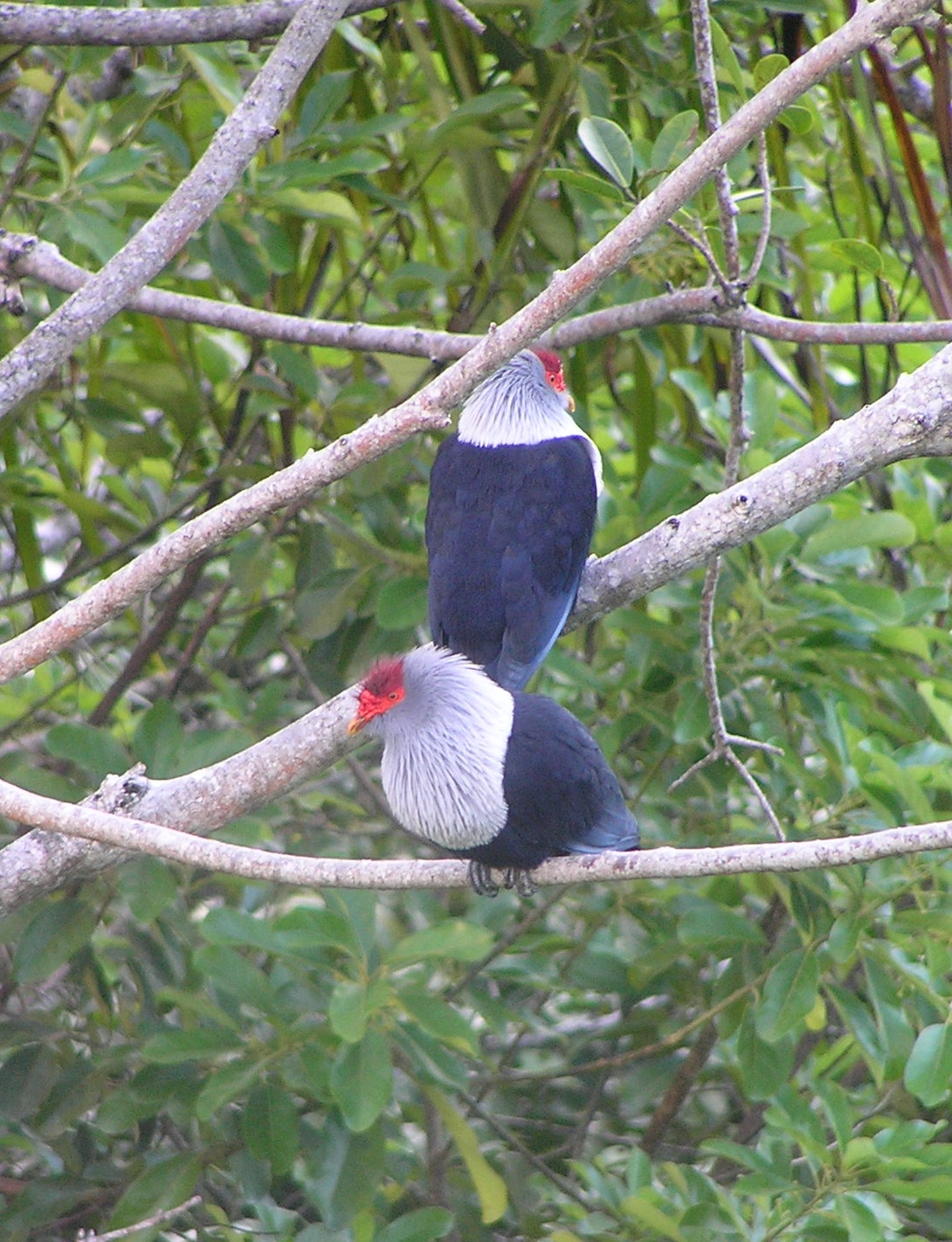
The IBA is an important site for Seychelles blue pigeons

The Praslin National Park and surrounding areas Important Bird Area lies in the southern part of the island of Praslin in the Seychelles archipelago of the western Indian Ocean.

== Description ==
The 700 ha Important Bird Area (IBA) extends from sea-level to the highest point of the island at an elevation of 367 m. It includes the 330 ha Praslin National Park as well as additional land to the south-east. The hill-slopes of the site are mainly covered by mixed secondary forest containing a high proportion of native plants, notably all six of Seychelles’ endemic palm species. It includes the palm forest of the World Heritage listed Vallée de Mai, as well as many small streams and waterfalls. The south-eastern part of the site is drier, characterised by boulders and caves amongst scrub vegetation.

=== Fauna ===
The site was identified as an IBA by BirdLife International because it supports populations of Seychelles kestrels, Seychelles blue pigeons, Seychelles swiftlets, Seychelles bulbuls and Seychelles sunbirds. Reptiles and amphibians found at the site include the Seychelle Islands tree frog, six caecilians, four geckos, two skinks and two snakes, all of which are endemic. Hawksbill turtles nest on the beaches and green turtles feed along the coast. Most of the Praslin population of the Seychelles fruit bat roosts in the IBA.
