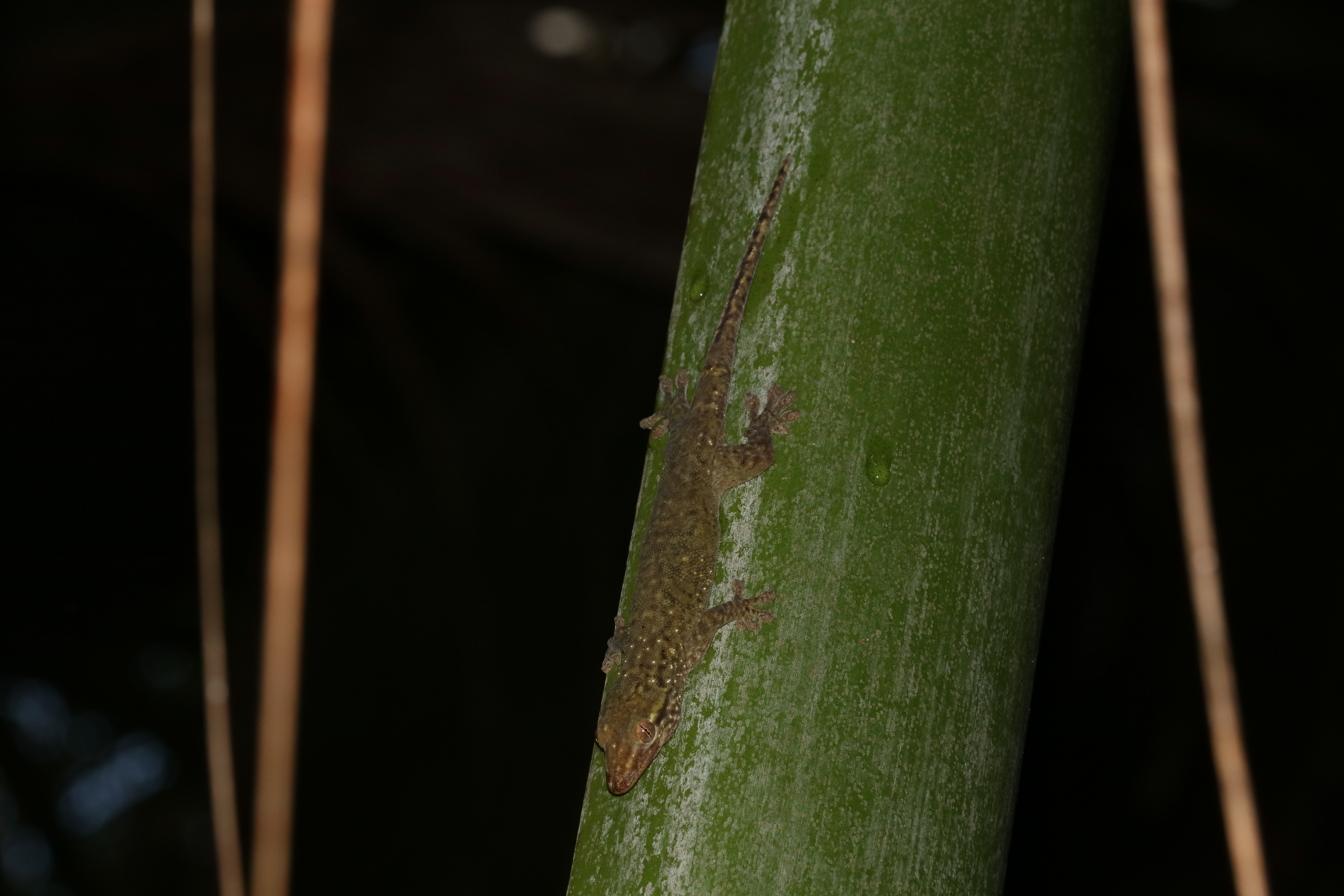
- Ailuronyx tachyscopaeus on a palm leaf

Conservation status
- Near Threatened (IUCN 3.1)

Scientific classification
- Kingdom: Animalia
- Phylum: Chordata
- Class: Reptilia
- Order: Squamata
- Suborder: Gekkota
- Family: Gekkonidae
- Genus: Ailuronyx
- Species: A. tachyscopaeus

Binomial name
- Ailuronyx tachyscopaeus Gerlach & Canning, 1996
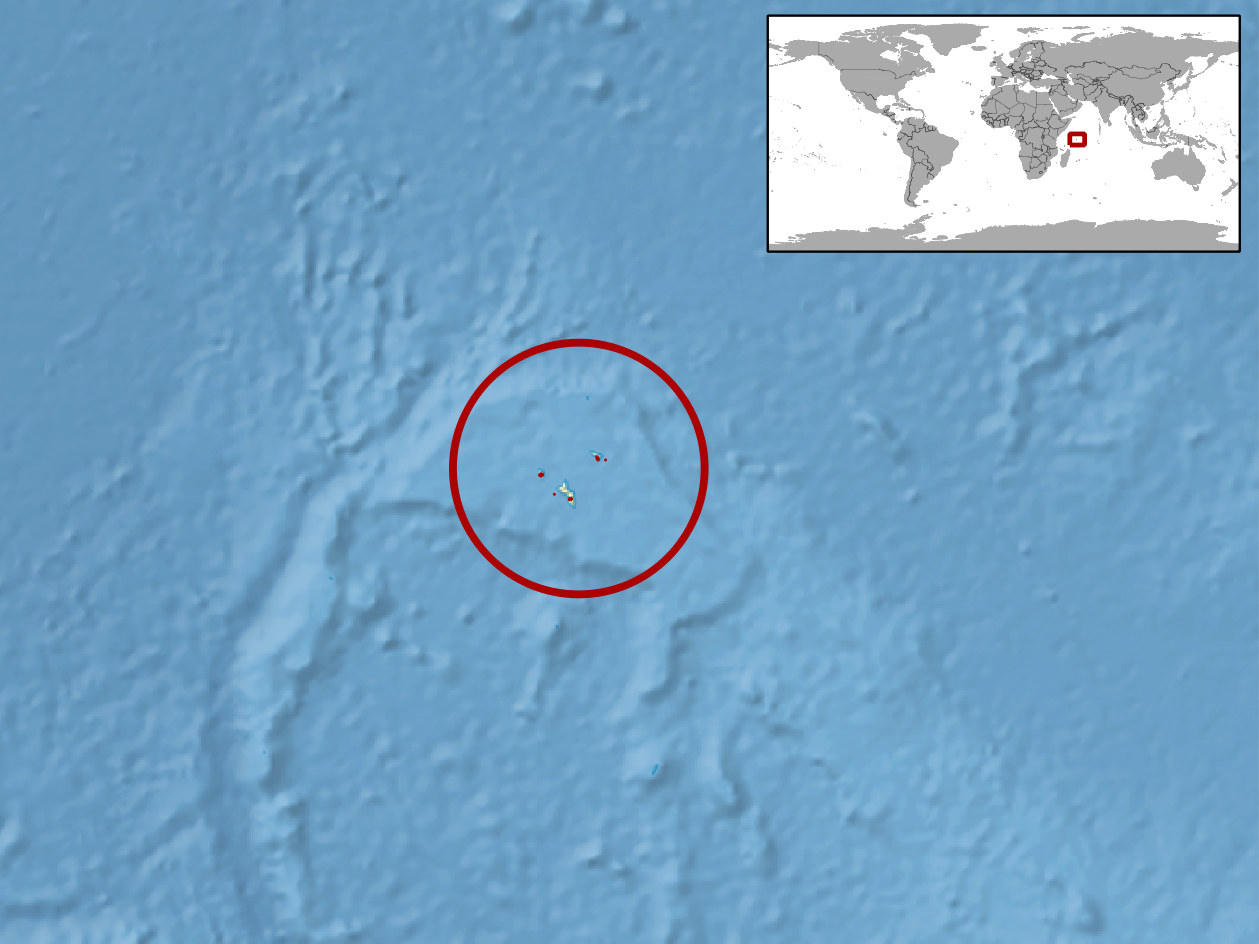

= Dwarf bronze gecko =

Species of lizard

The dwarf bronze gecko (Ailuronyx tachyscopaeus) is a species of lizards in the family Gekkonidae endemic to Seychelles.

The dwarf bronze gecko is an arboreal species found in low-growing vegetation in woodland, usually in association with palms where it can reach high densities. It can also occur in coconut plantations and live in buildings. It is an adaptable species, but its range is small. It occurs in the Praslin National Park. Adults can grow to 84 mm (3.3 in) in snout–vent length. It is oviparous and the eggs are glued to palm leaves.
