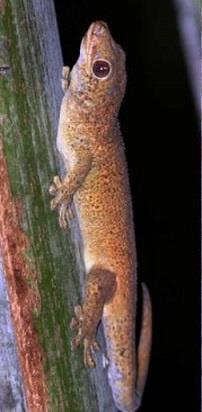

Conservation status
- Least Concern (IUCN 3.1)

Scientific classification
- Kingdom: Animalia
- Phylum: Chordata
- Class: Reptilia
- Order: Squamata
- Suborder: Gekkota
- Family: Gekkonidae
- Genus: Ailuronyx
- Species: A. seychellensis

Binomial name
- Ailuronyx seychellensis (Duméril & Bibron, 1834)
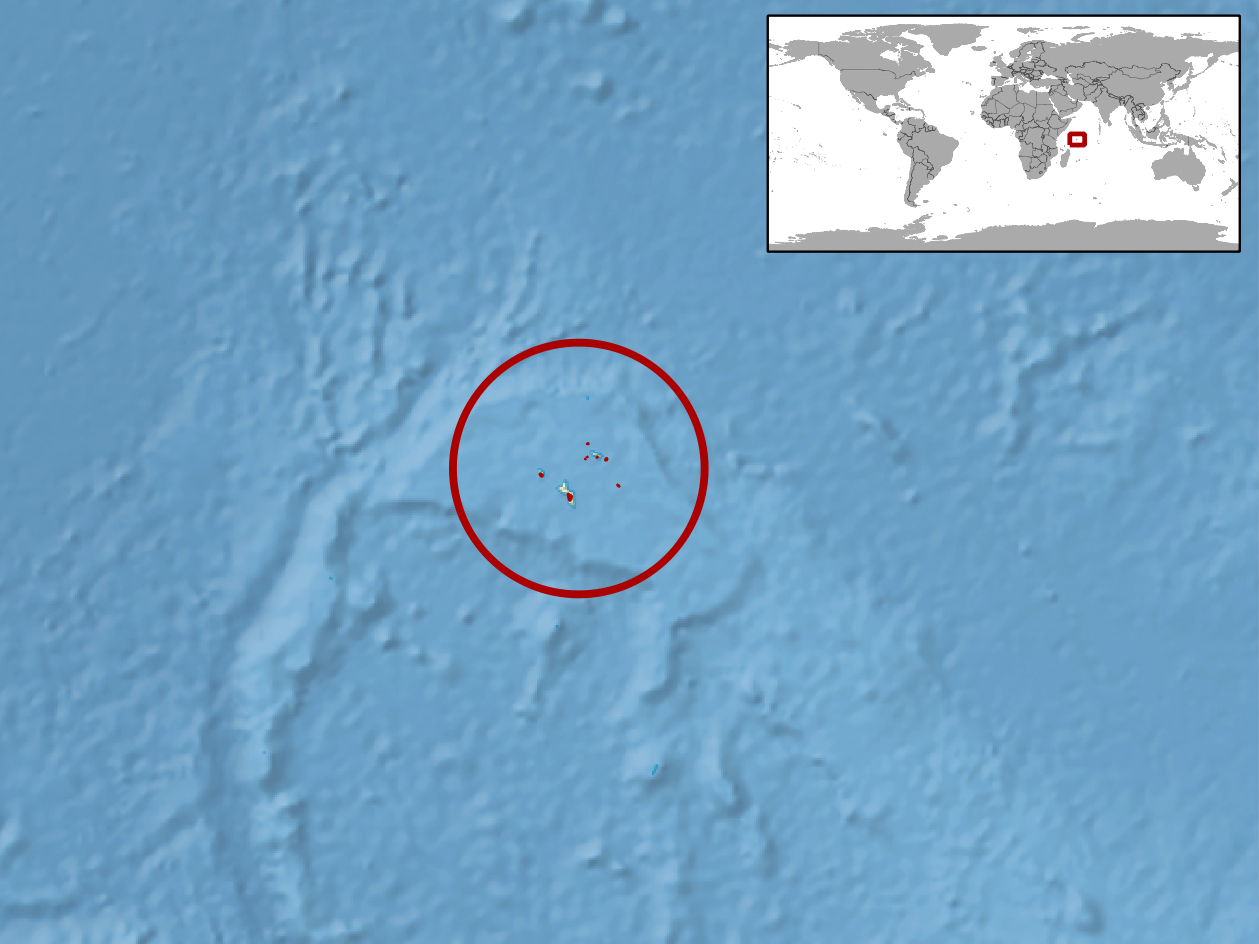

= Seychelles bronze gecko =

Species of lizard

The Seychelles bronze-eyed gecko (Ailuronyx seychellensis), also known as Seychelles bronze gecko, is a species of lizard in the family Gekkonidae endemic to Seychelles.

Its natural habitats are subtropical or tropical dry forests, subtropical or tropical moist lowland forests, plantations, rural gardens, and heavily degraded former forests. It is threatened by habitat loss.

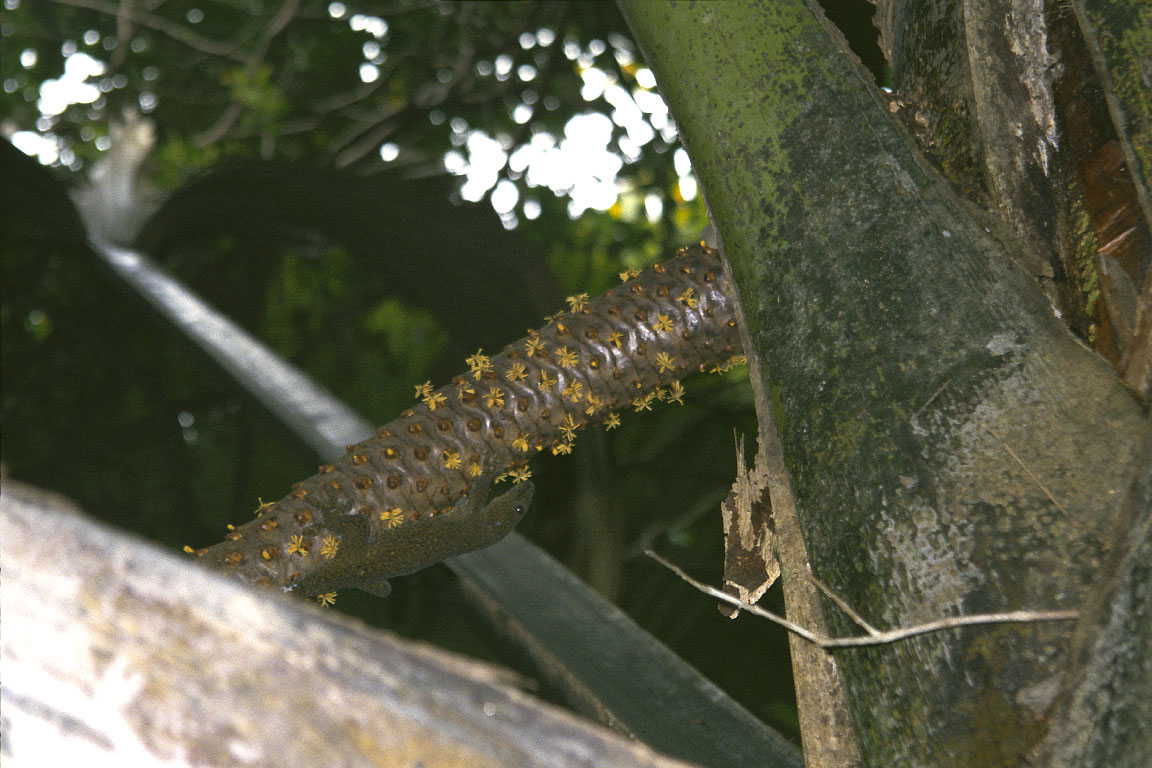
Seychelles bronze gecko on a male coco de mer in Valle de Mai, Praslin, Seychelles
