= Chauve Souris, Mahé =

Chauve Souris Island
Nickname: Bat Island
- Location within Seychelles

Geography
- Location: Seychelles, Indian Ocean
- Coordinates: 4°44′20″S 55°27′48″E
- Archipelago: Inner Islands, Seychelles
- Adjacent to: Indian Ocean
- Total islands: 1
- Major islands: Chauve Souris
- Area: 0.003 km^{2} (0.0012 sq mi)
- Length: 0.05 km (0.031 mi)
- Width: 0.05 km (0.031 mi)
- Coastline: 0.1 km (0.06 mi)
- Highest elevation: 9 m (30 ft)

Administration
- Seychelles
- Group: Inner Islands
- Sub-Group: Granitic Seychelles
- Sub-Group: Mahe Islands
- Districts: Baie Lazare

Demographics
- Population: 0 (2014)
- Pop. density: 0/km^{2} (0/sq mi)
- Ethnic groups: Creole, French, East Africans, Indians.

Additional information
- Time zone: SCT (UTC+4)
- ISO code: SC-06
- Official website: www.seychelles.travel/en/discover/the-islands/

Chauve Souris is an island in Seychelles, lying 400 m west of Anse La Mouche on the island of Mahé. The island is a rocky granite island covered with tropical forest. There is also a Chauve Souris island near the northern coast of the island of Praslin.

== Image gallery ==
Map 1

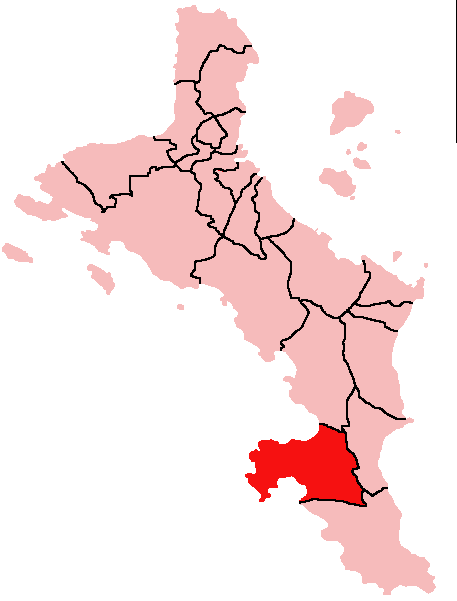
District Map
