= Vallée de Mai =

Protected area, Seychelles

Vallée de Mai Nature Reserve
UNESCO World Heritage Site
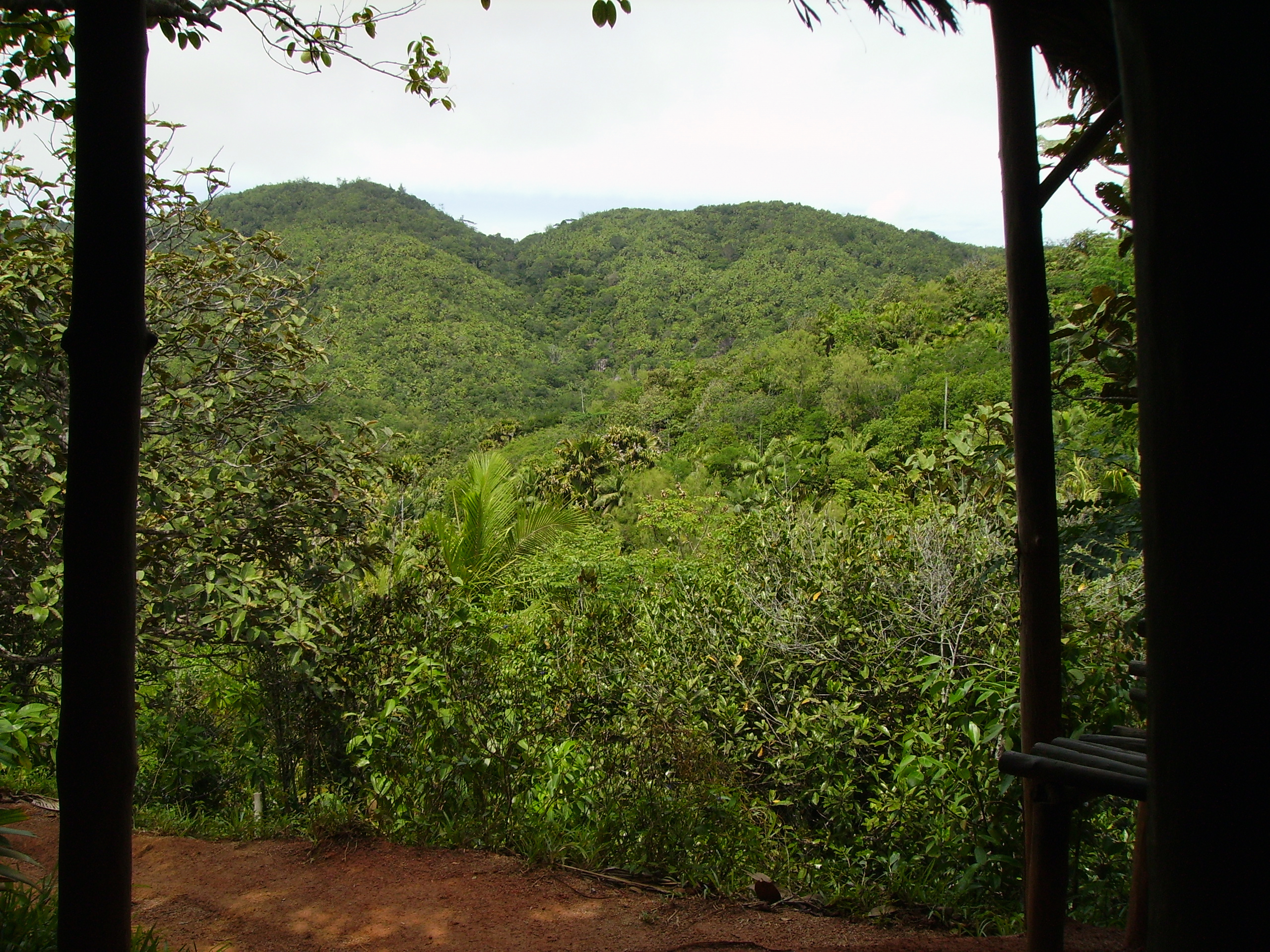

- Location within Seychelles Location within Indian Ocean
- Location: Praslin, Seychelles
- Criteria: Natural: (vii), (viii), (ix), (x)
- Reference: 261
- Inscription: 1983 (7th Session)
- Area: 19.5 ha (48 acres)
- Website: seychelles.travel/en/explore/attractions/1906
- Coordinates: 4°19′45″S 55°44′15″E

Vallée de Mai Nature Reserve ("May Valley") is a nature park on the island of Praslin in the Seychelles. It consists of a well-preserved palm forest, flagship species made up of the island endemic coco de mer, as well as five other endemic palms. In 1983, it was inscribed as a UNESCO World Heritage Site, ranking as one of the world's smallest natural properties on the list at just 19.5 hectares (48 acres).

The coco de mer (Lodoicea maldivica), a monocot tree in the Arecaceae (palm family), has the largest seeds (double nut seed) of any plant in the world. Also unique to the park is its wildlife, including birds such as the rare Seychelles black parrot, mammals, crustaceans, snails, and reptiles.

There has been a determined effort to eliminate all the introduced exotic species of plants from the area but this has not been successful in eliminating coffee, pineapple, and ornamental palms thus far. This forest, with its peculiar plant and animal species, is a relict from the time when the supercontinent of Gondwana was divided into smaller parts, leaving the Seychelles islands between the present day Madagascar and India. As of July 2025, the reserve is managed and maintained by Seychelles Islands Foundation.

== Geography ==
The reserve is in the middle of the Praslin Island which is the second largest island in Seychelles, where the highest mountain, Fond Azore, rises to a height of 373 metres (1,224 ft). Praslin is 37 square kilometres (14 sq mi) in area 11–5.5 kilometres (6.8–3.4 mi). It is located to northeast of Mahe, about 45 kilometres (28 mi) away It is the lower region of a valley near the head of a stream. It covers an area of a 19.5 ha and is in a virgin state, and is traced to the prehistoric times.

The geological formation is of granite as is the entire island; called as a "microcontinent", its evolution is not of volcanic or coraline origin as is the other islands in the Indian Ocean.

== Legend ==
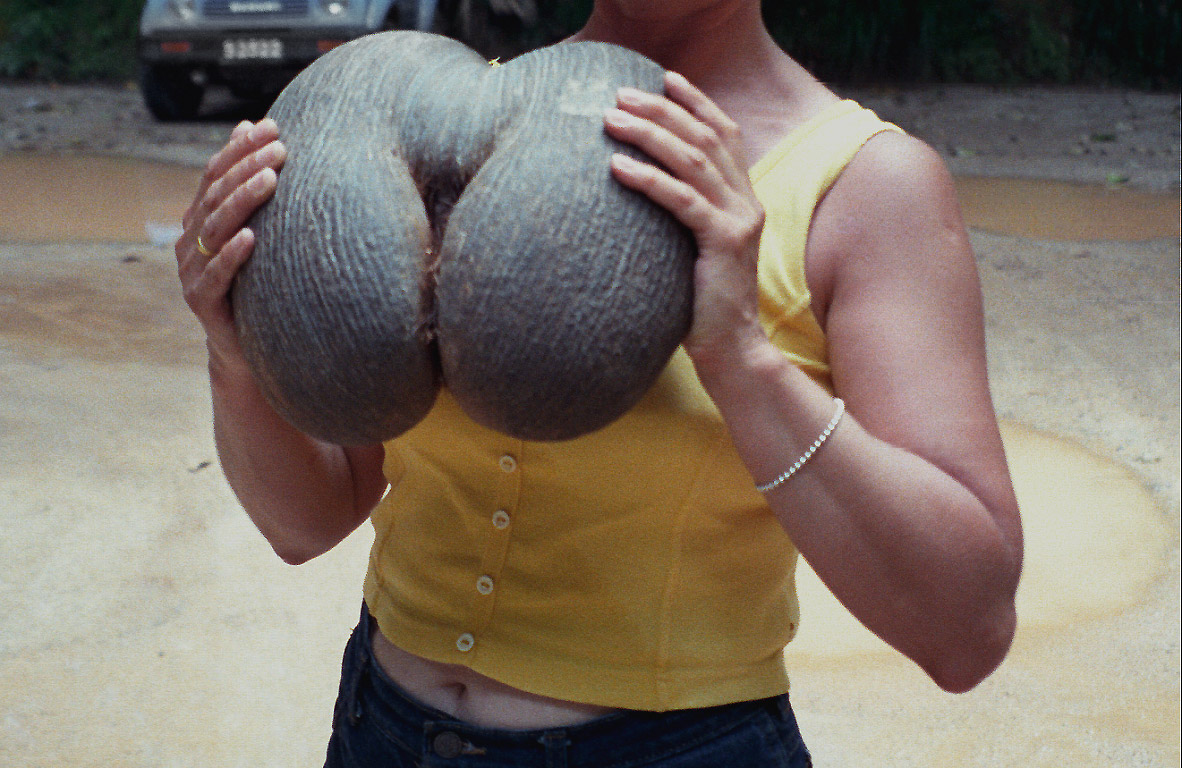
The double nut of coco de mer

The British General Charles George Gordon propagated a myth in the 19th century after he visited the island on a military mission in 1881. Based on a Kabbalistic review of the Book of Genesis, he visioned Vallée de Mai as the Garden of Eden. He had said that he had corroborative proof to support this. His theory was that the palm tree was the tree of knowledge representing both good and evil, and that the breadfruit tree introduced into the island, was the tree of life. He even went to the extent of marking the exact location of the Garden of Eden on the island as the ‘'Coco-de-mer" valley. Only in this reserve, apart from the endemic coco de mer (which he considered as the forbidden fruit due to its reputed aphrodisiac quality), are all of Seychelles' endemic palm species found together. His observation was that the peculiar suggestive shape of its fruits was to have "caused the plague of our forefathers in the Garden of Eden".

His observation was contested by another writer H. Watley Estridge who pointed out to Gordon that the 10 centimetres (3.9 in) thick husk of the fruit was impossible to have been bitten through by Eve, to which Gordon had no plausible answer. The endemic black parrot almost exclusively nests in the dead standing trunks of this palm.

== History ==
The park was an undisturbed virgin forest until the 1930s. The locale got the status of Nature Reserve under the Wild Birds Protection (Nature Reserves) Regulation S. I. 27/1696, on 18 April 1966. This was followed by changing the status to a National Park for better conservation and preservation actions under the National Parks and Nature Conservancy Act (Cap. 159) S.I. No. 57 of 1979, Praslin National Park (Designation) Order of 1979, and the Cocooode- Management Decree 1978.

Inscribed by UNESCO in 1983 under Criterion (vii), (viii),(ix), and (x), Vallée de Mai is one of the organization's smallest natural World Heritage Sites.

== Flora ==
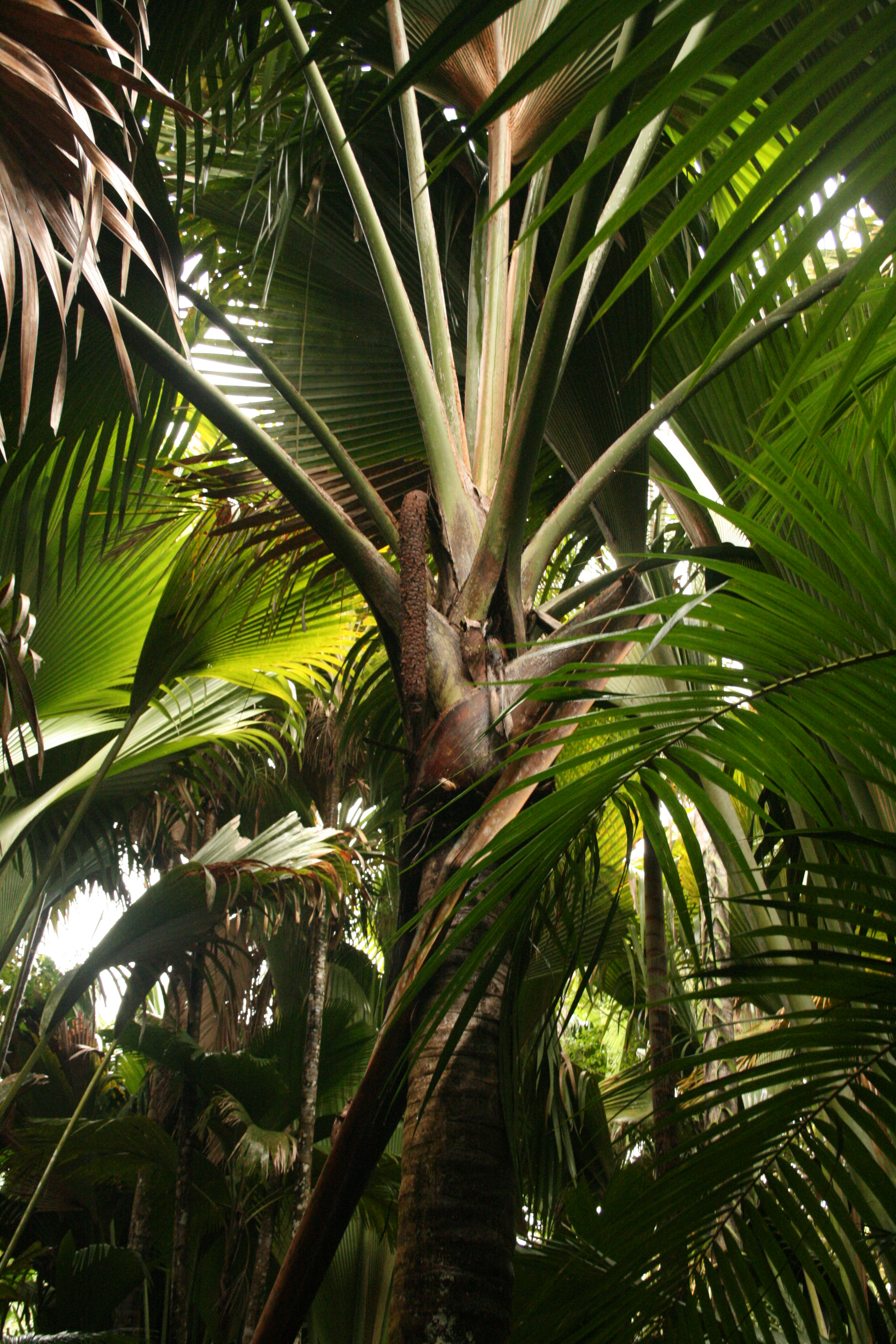
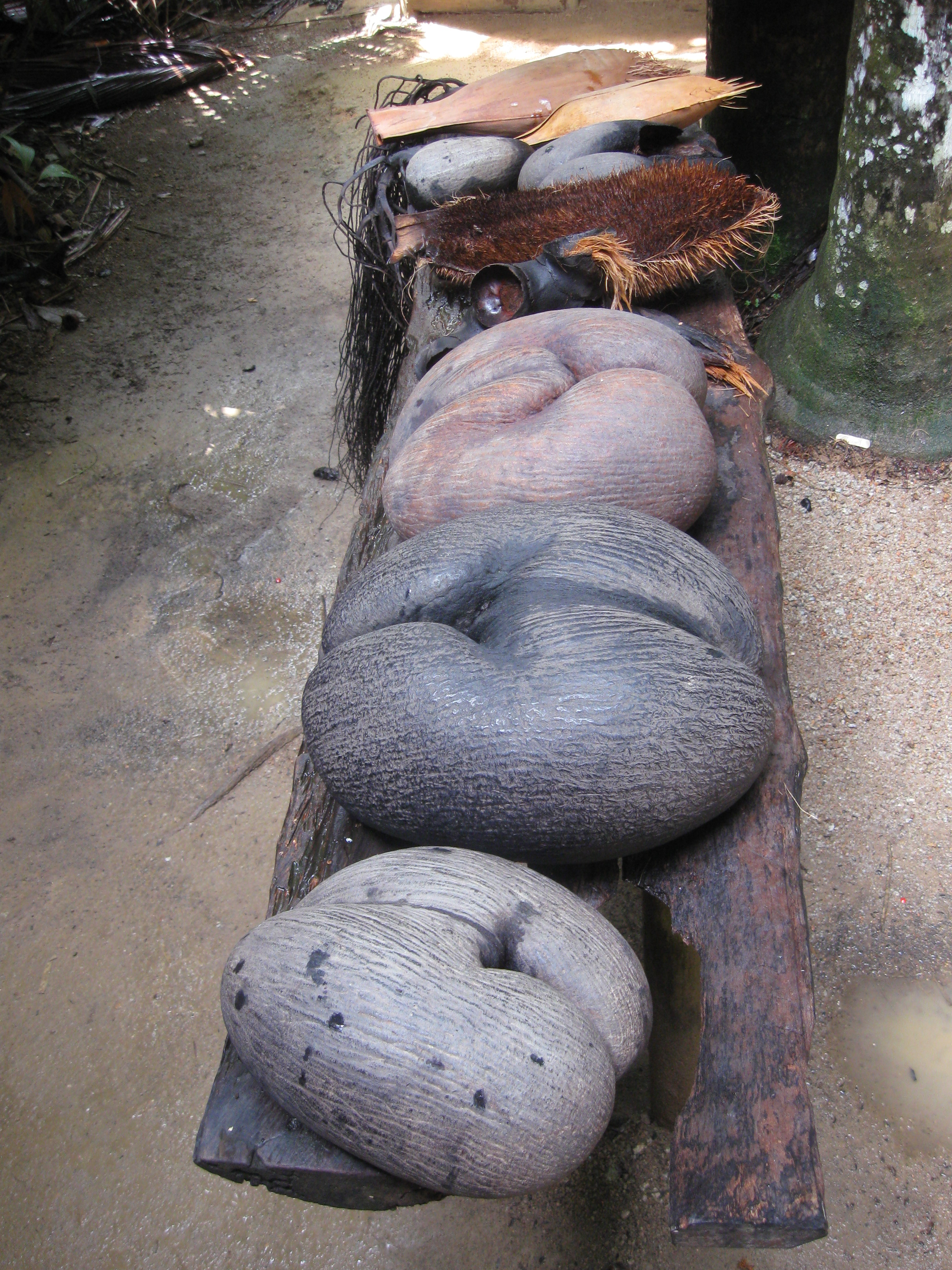
Left: coco de mer male flower tree. Right: double nut of palm of the largest size in the world

The park is the habitat for endemic coco-de-mer, which is reported as the "flagship species of global significance" growing to a height of 25–34 metres (82–112 ft). It is fan-shaped with leaves 7–10 metres (23–33 ft) long and 4.5 metres (15 ft) wide, and its petioles (stems) are 4 metres (13 ft) long. The tree bears the largest double nut with the largest seed, among the species of the plant biodiversity found in the world; the weight of its largest fruit was 42 kilograms (93 lb). This tree is made up of stilt roots and has its canopy formed by leaves. The roots and the trunk are not easily distinguishable and they bear fruits of round and oval shape.

There are five other endemic palm species; millionaire's salad (Deckenia nobilis), thief palm (Phoenicophorium borsigianum), Seychelles stilt palm (Verschaffeltia splendida) latanier millepattes (Nephrosperma vanhoutteanum) and latanier palm (Roscheria melanochaetes). These six species of palms are not only unique to this reserve but also to the Seychelles, and are not found anywhere else in the Indian Ocean. The forest is dense with Pandanus screw palms and broad leaf trees. Chrysobalanus icaco Cocoplum is also reported. Some amount of supplementation has occurred in the plantation of these species of palms with the only intent of maintaining the ecosystem.

There are some 4000 palm trees in the park (5,000 is also mentioned of equal number of male and female species). Two other endemic trees in the park are Dillena furruginea also known as bwa rouz and Northia hornei or the Kapisen. Takamaka trees are the entrance to the park and when they flower Seychelles sun birds feed on the nectar of the flowers. Shy tenrec have been introduced into the park from Madagascar.

== Fauna ==
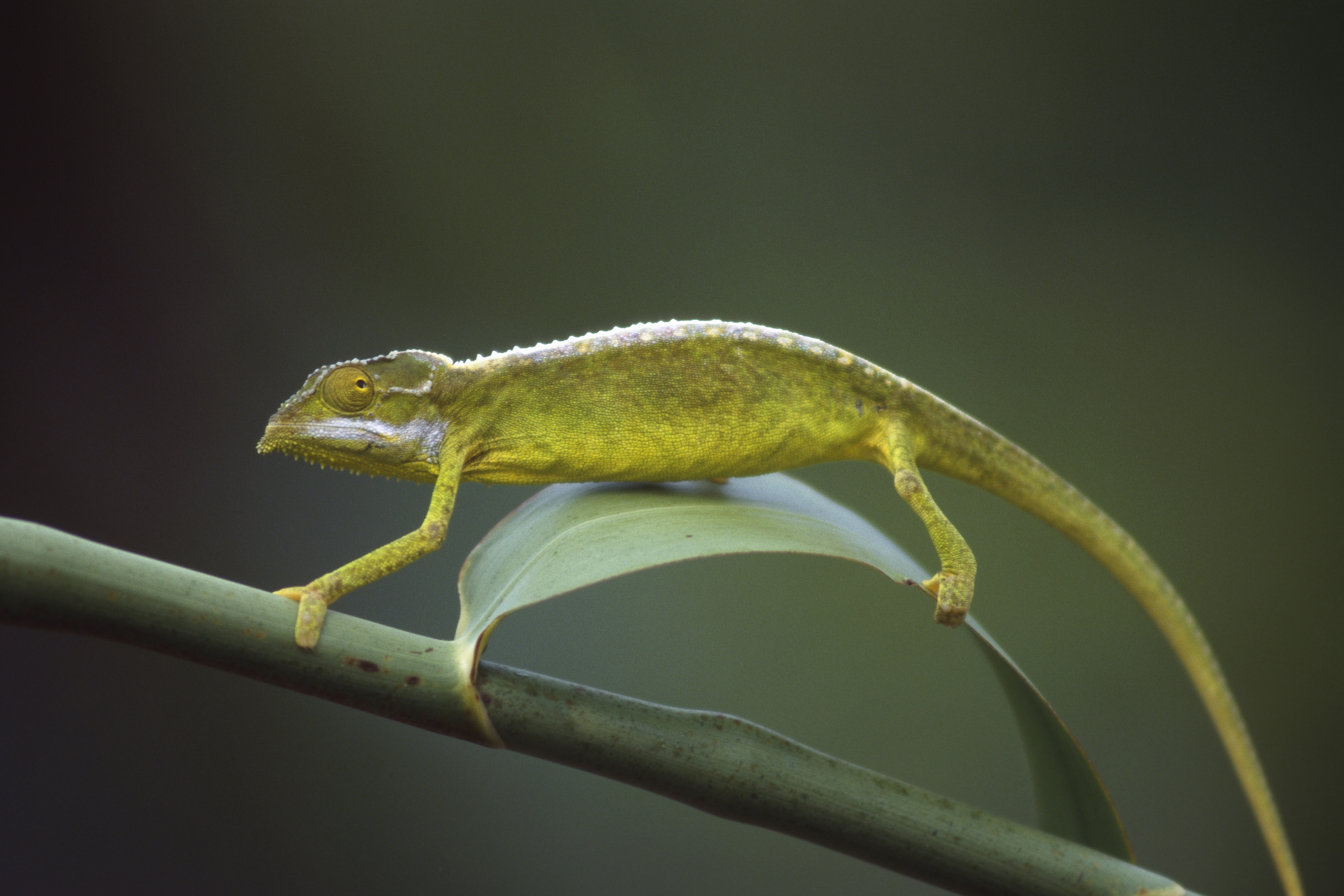
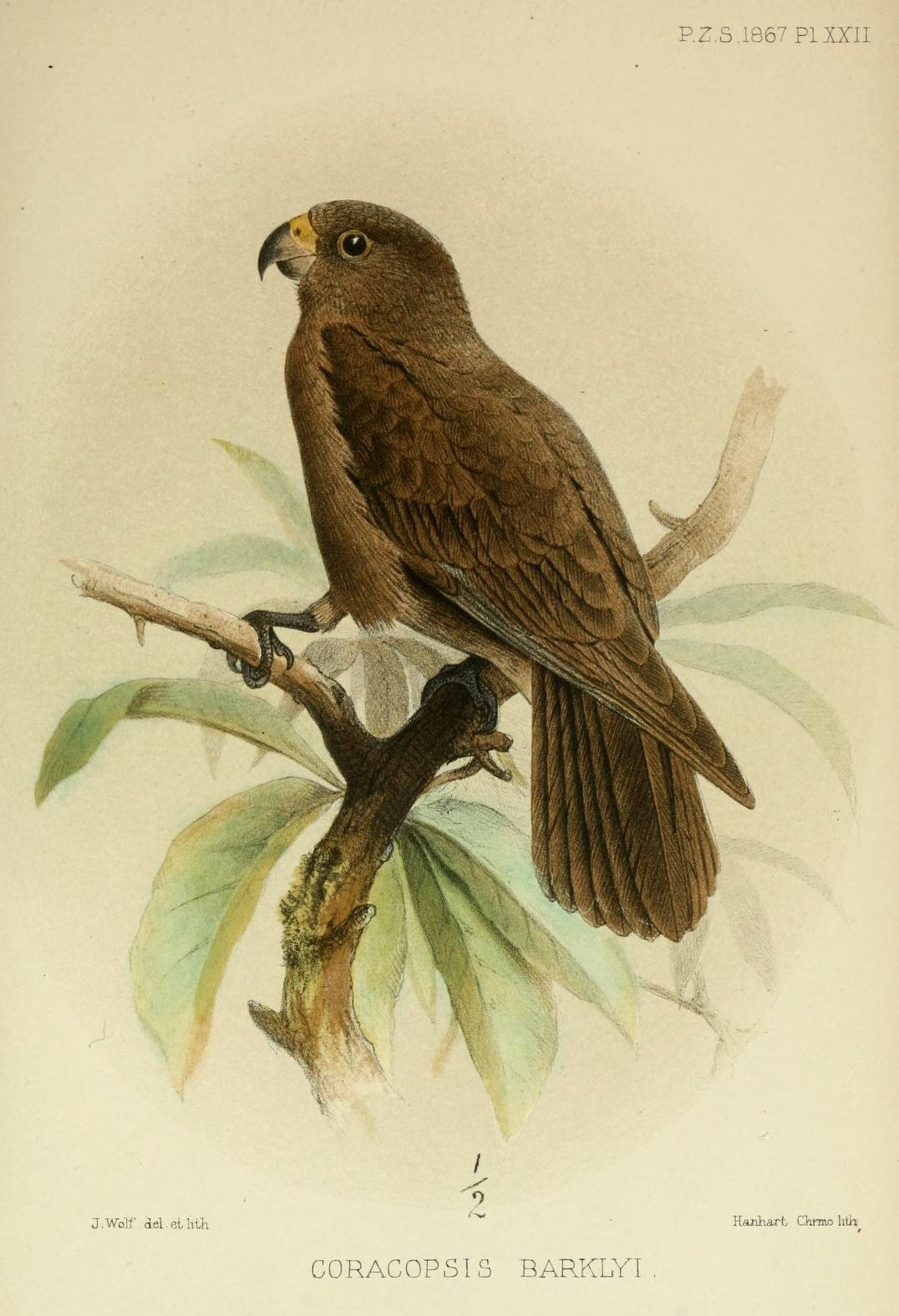
Left: tiger chameleon. Right: Seychelles black parrot (Coracopsis barklyi)

The prominent avifauna, both endemic and global species, with the palm trees as their habitat, are: the Seychelles black parrot (Coracopsis barklyi) (called an "enigmatic bird" that feeds on the fruits of the palm trees and they are akin to the vasa parrots of Madagascar), Alectroenas pulcherrimus (Seychelles blue pigeon); Hypsipetes crassirostris (Seychelles bulbul); Nectarinia dussumieri (Seychelles sunbird); Collocalia francica (Mascarene swiftlet); and Falco araea (Seychelles kestrel).

Other animals are Archaius tigris (tiger chameleon); Trachylepis seychellensis (Seychelles skink); Mabuya wrightii (Wright's skink); Scelotes braueri; Pamelaescincus gardineri (Gardiner's burrowing skink) (skinks are seen on the floor of the park); Ailuronyx seychellensis (Seychelles bronze gecko); caecilians and tree frogs. Phelsuma astriata (Seychelles small day gecko); and Phelsuma sundbergi (Seychelles giant day gecko). Reptile species are; Boaedon geometricus (Seychelles house snake); Lycognathophis seychellensis (Seychelles wolf snake); and Ramphotyphlops braminus (blind snake). Six species of caecilians, a group of worm-like amphibians, are reported from the deep moist soil layers of the park. Seychelles treefrogs (Tachycnemis seychellensis) are seen hugging the tree leaves.

Mollusca found in the park are Praslin snail (Pachnodus paslinus) which has a twirled and pointed shell, and the large Stylodonta studeriana. They are found to feed on the palm coco de mer; the male feeds on the flowers on the catkin of the male coco de mer.

The endemic golden panchax (Pachypanchax playfairi) is the only freshwater fish endemic to the Seychelles. There are also several freshwater crustaceans and other invertebrates in the park.

== Bibliography ==
- Mair, Lyn; Beckley, Lynnath (2012). Seychelles. Bradt Travel Guides. pp. 126–. ISBN 978-1-84162-406-8.
- Coe, Malcolm James (1998). A Fragile Eden: Portraits of the Endemic Flowering Plants of the Granitic Seychelles. Princeton University Press. pp. 24–. ISBN 978-0-691-04817-8.
