= Anse Georgette =

Beach in Praslin island, Seychelles

Coordinates: 4.294959948820925°S 55.68093251855003°E

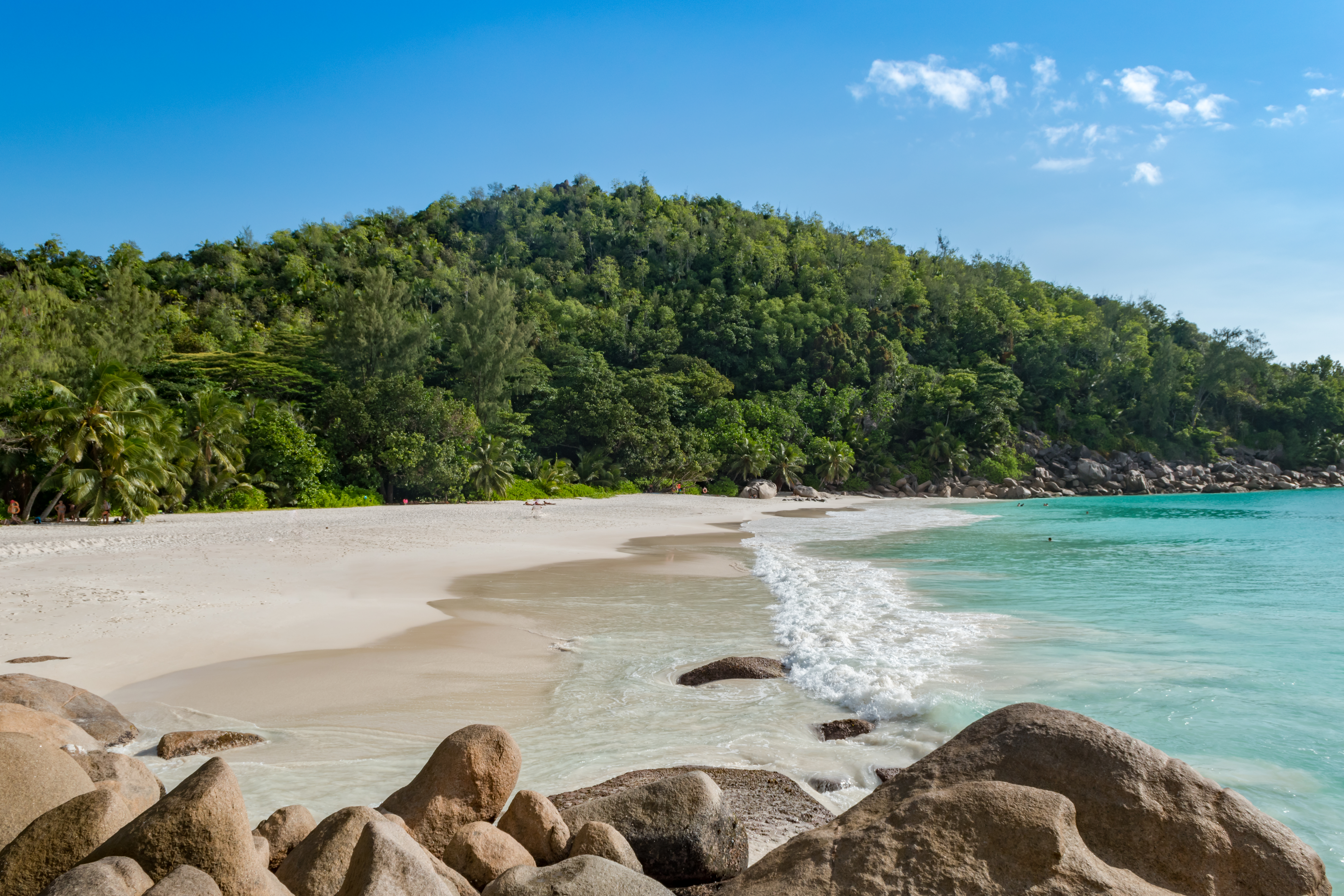
- Anse Georgette, April 2017 Anse Georgette, April 2017
- Location: Praslin, Seychelles
- Coast: Indian Ocean
- Type: Rural, natural sandy beach
- Total length: 0.5 km (0.31 mi)
- Maximum width: 20 m (66 ft)
- Orientation: north west
- Notable landmarks: Constance Lémuria
- Governing authority: Seychelles National Parks Authority

Anse Georgette is a beach situated in the northwestern coast of Praslin, Seychelles. It is ranked among the top 10 best beaches in the world for 2024.

== Overview ==
The beach remains completely untouched and preserved in its natural state, surrounded by takamaka trees and edged with massive granite boulders.

In 2011, the Seychelles Maritime Safety Authority implemented a temporary ban on entering the water and swimming at Anse Georgette due to a series of shark attacks in the adjoining Anse Lazio.

== Location ==
The beach is situated within the private grounds of the Constance Lémuria Resort. Although access is restricted, non-resort guests can visit with prior permission. Also, it can be accessed by hiking from the nearby Anse Lazio or by a boat.

== In media ==
- In 2024, UAE-based The National ranked it 8th among the top 50 best beaches in the world.
