= Chauve Souris, Praslin =

Island in Seychelles

Chauve Souris Island
Nickname: Jeanette Island
- Location within Seychelles

Geography
- Location: Seychelles, Indian Ocean
- Coordinates: 4°18′36.7″S 55°44′44.7″E
- Archipelago: Inner Islands, Seychelles
- Adjacent to: Indian Ocean
- Total islands: 1
- Major islands: Chauve Souris
- Area: 0.01 km^{2} (0.0039 sq mi)
- Length: 0.15 km (0.093 mi)
- Width: 0.05 km (0.031 mi)
- Coastline: 0.35 km (0.217 mi)
- Highest elevation: 10 m (30 ft)

Administration
- Seychelles
- Group: Inner Islands
- Sub-Group: Granitic Seychelles
- Sub-Group: Praslin Islands
- Districts: Baie Sainte Anne
- Largest settlement: Chauve Souris (pop. 2)

Demographics
- Population: 2 (2014)
- Pop. density: 200/km^{2} (500/sq mi)
- Ethnic groups: Creole, French, East Africans, Indians.

Additional information
- Time zone: SCT (UTC+4)
- ISO code: SC-07
- Official website: www.seychelles.travel/en/discover/the-islands/

Chauve Souris is an island in Seychelles, lying 400 m northeast of the island of Praslin. Another nearby island - Saint-Pierre Island is located immediately in the north. The island is a granite island covered with tropical forest. Fauna is limited to the likes of skinks, geckos and limited birdlife that chiefly use the island as a roost.

The island is privately owned. Chauve Souris Island has a small resort: Club Vacanze Seychelles. There is also a Chauve Souris island near the western coast of the island of Mahé.

== Tourism ==
Today, the island's main industry is tourism.

== Image gallery ==
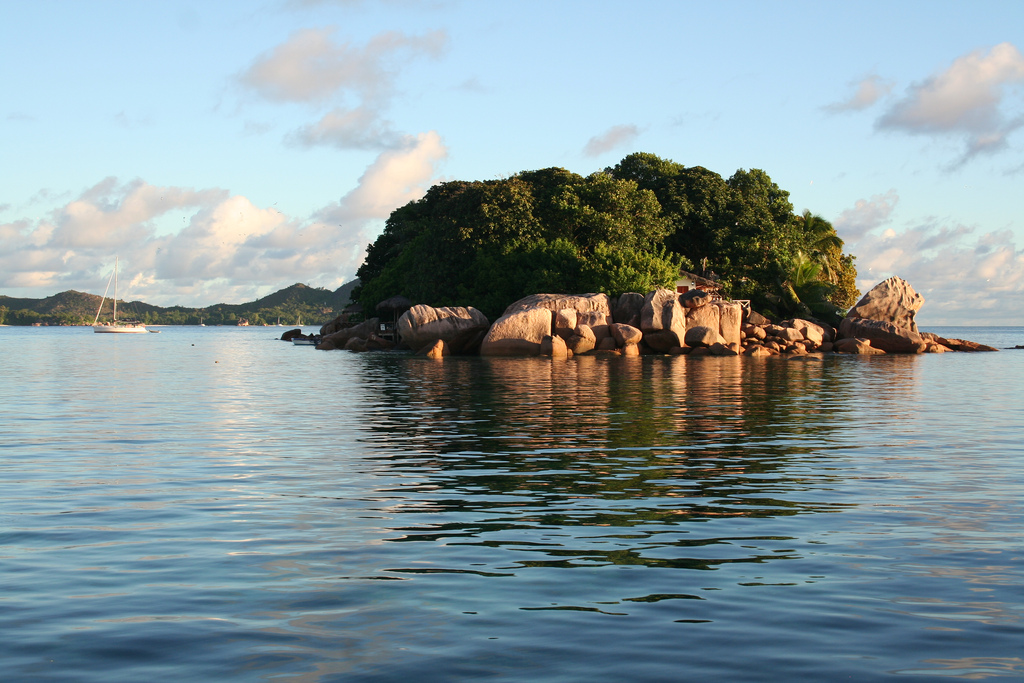
Image 1

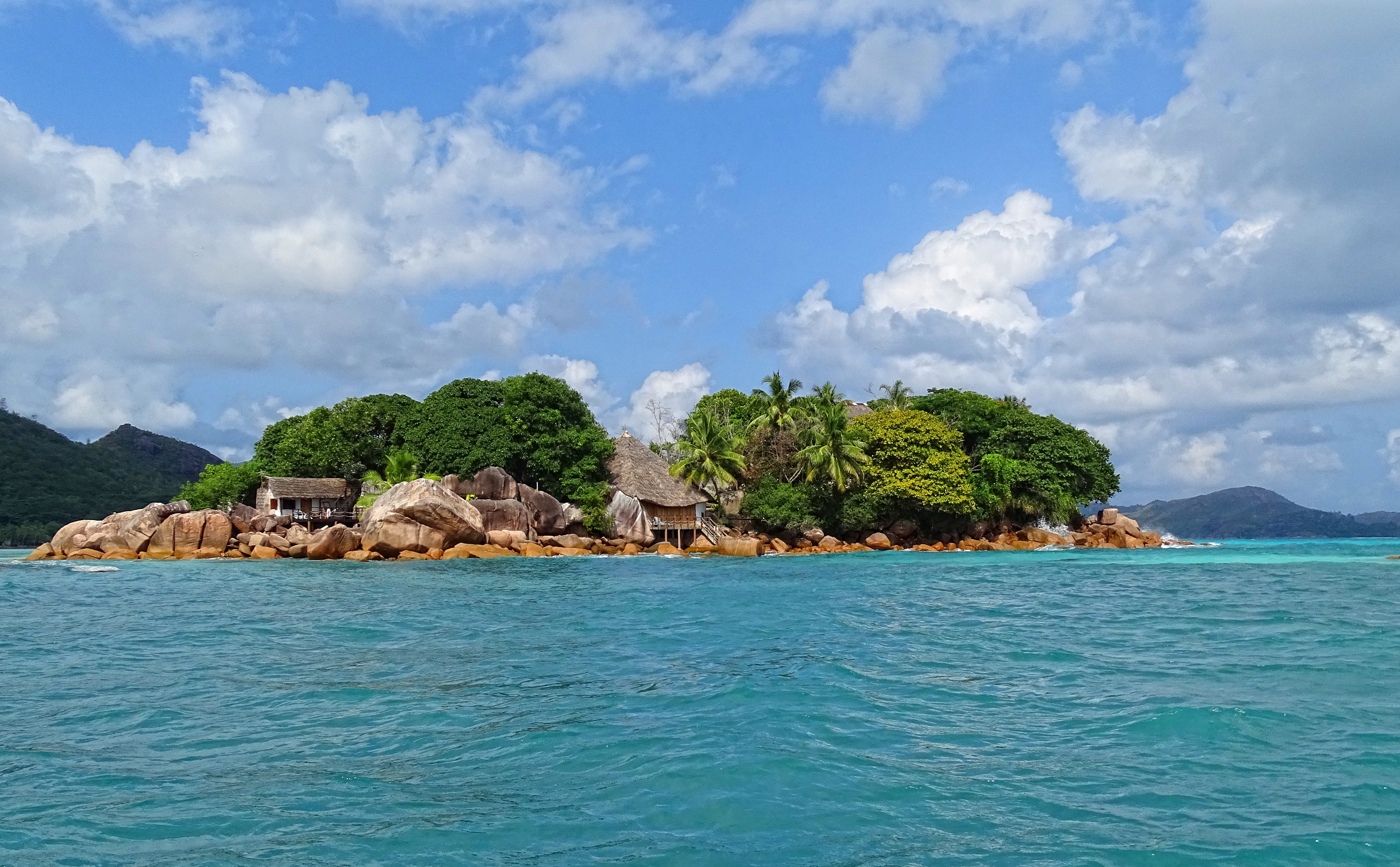
Image 2

Map 1

Map 2

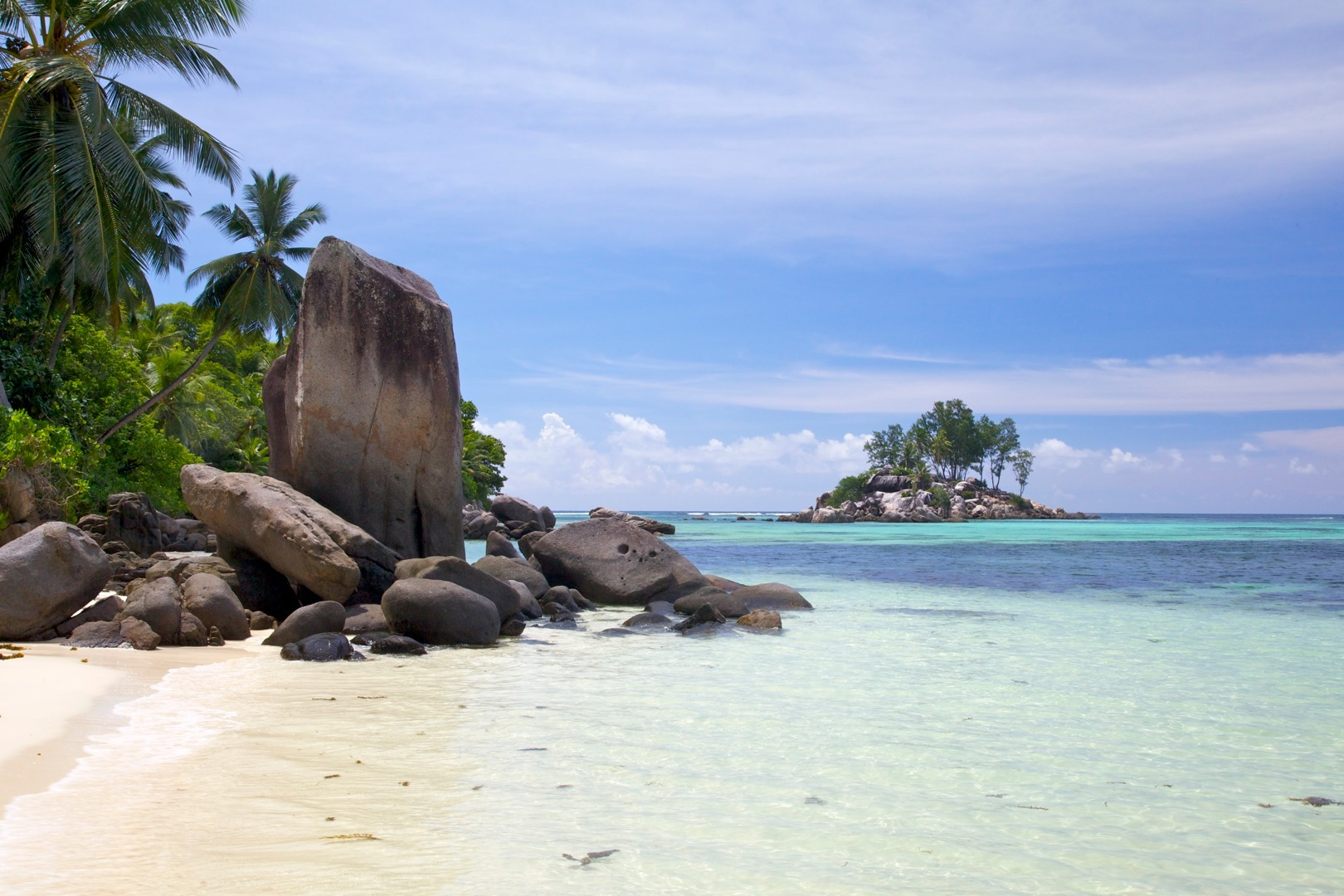
Island viewed from Anse Royal on Praslin
