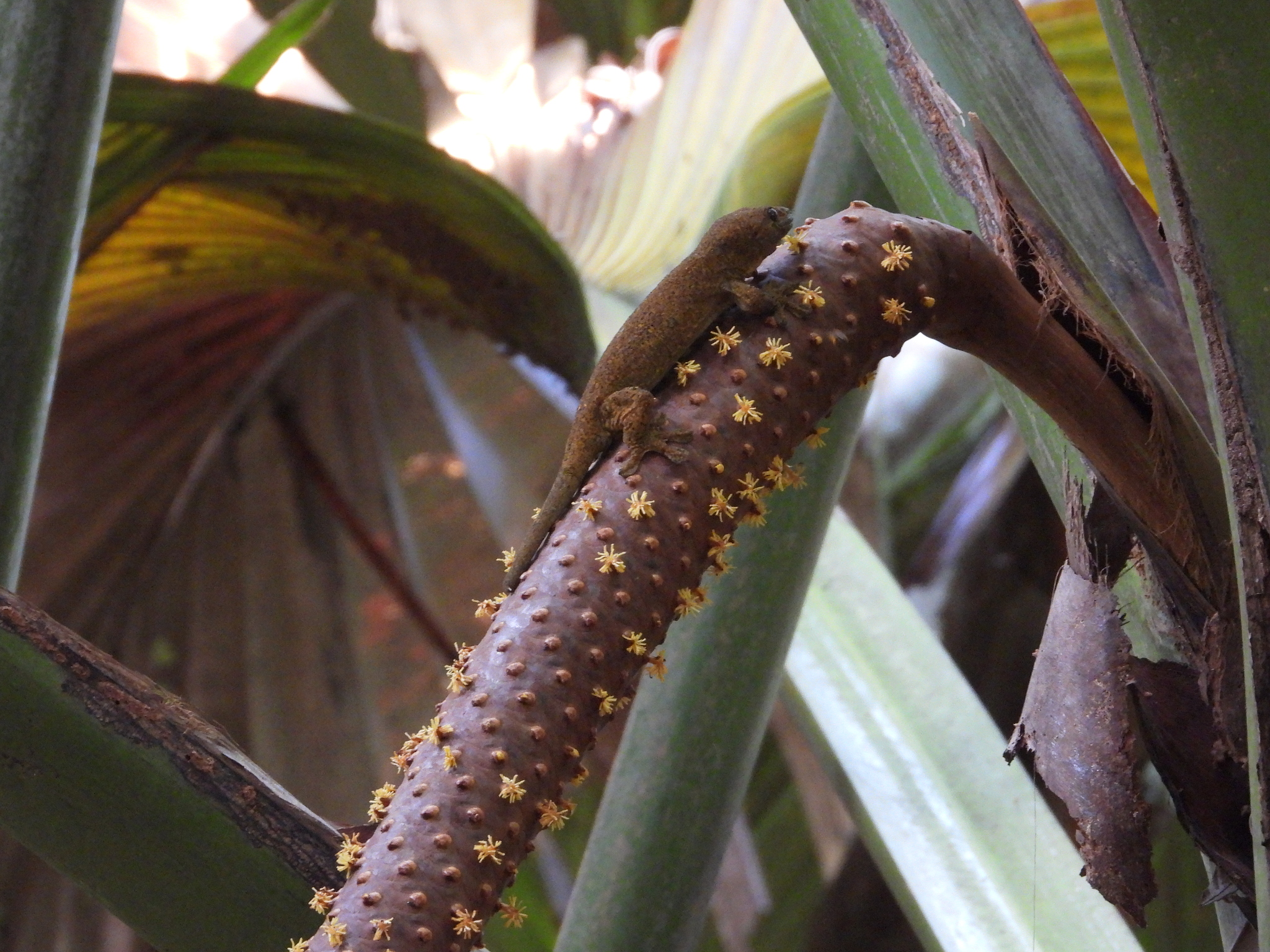

Conservation status
- Critically Endangered (IUCN 3.1)

Scientific classification
- Kingdom: Animalia
- Phylum: Chordata
- Class: Reptilia
- Order: Squamata
- Suborder: Gekkota
- Family: Gekkonidae
- Genus: Ailuronyx
- Species: A. trachygaster

Binomial name
- Ailuronyx trachygaster (Duméril & Bibron, 1851)
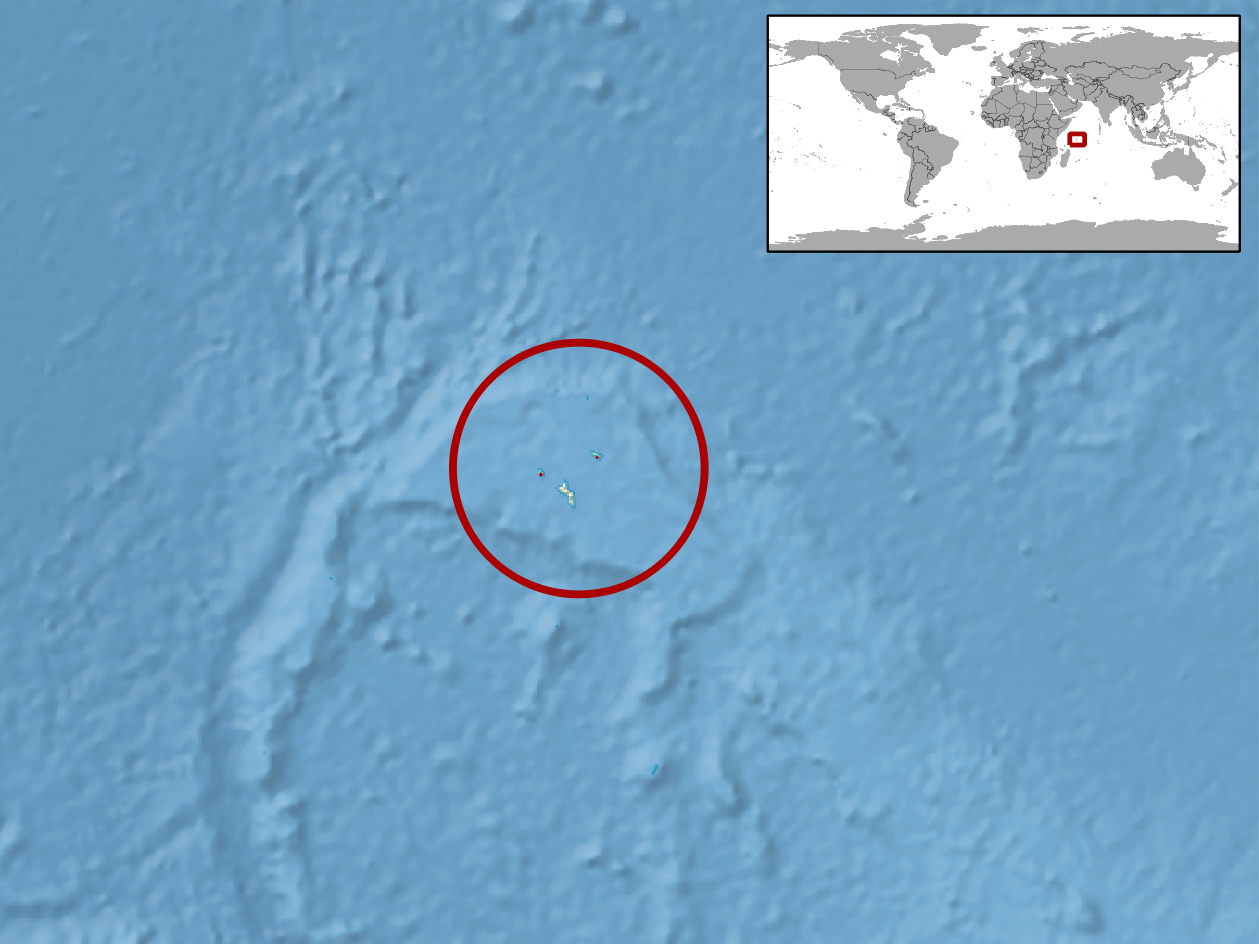

= Giant bronze gecko =

Species of lizard

The giant bronze gecko (Ailuronyx trachygaster) is a species of lizard in the family Gekkonidae endemic to Seychelles.

Its natural habitats are subtropical or tropical dry forests and subtropical or tropical moist lowland forests. It is threatened by habitat loss.
