= Ailuronyx =

Scientific classification
- Domain: Eukaryota
- Kingdom: Animalia
- Phylum: Chordata
- Class: Reptilia
- Order: Squamata
- Infraorder: Gekkota
- Family: Gekkonidae
- Subfamily: Uroplatinae
- Genus: Ailuronyx; Fitzinger, 1843
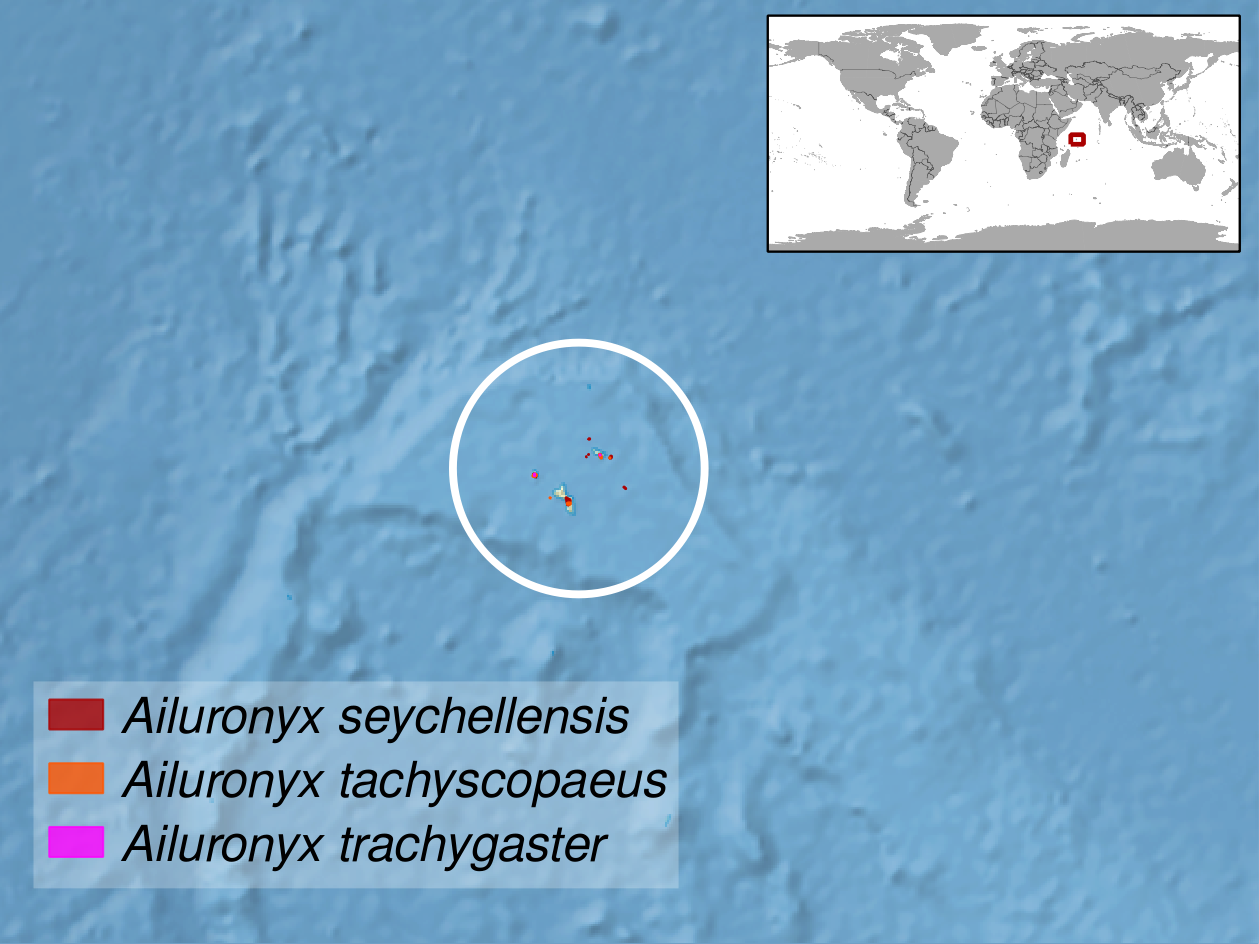

Genus of lizards

Ailuronyx is a small genus of geckos from Seychelles, commonly known as skin-sloughing geckos. They have a reputation for delicacy and especially for shedding strips of skin if handled.

== Classification of genus Ailuronyx ==
- Seychelles bronze gecko, A. seychellensis
- Dwarf bronze gecko, A. tachyscopaeus
- Giant bronze gecko or yellow gecko, A. trachygaster
