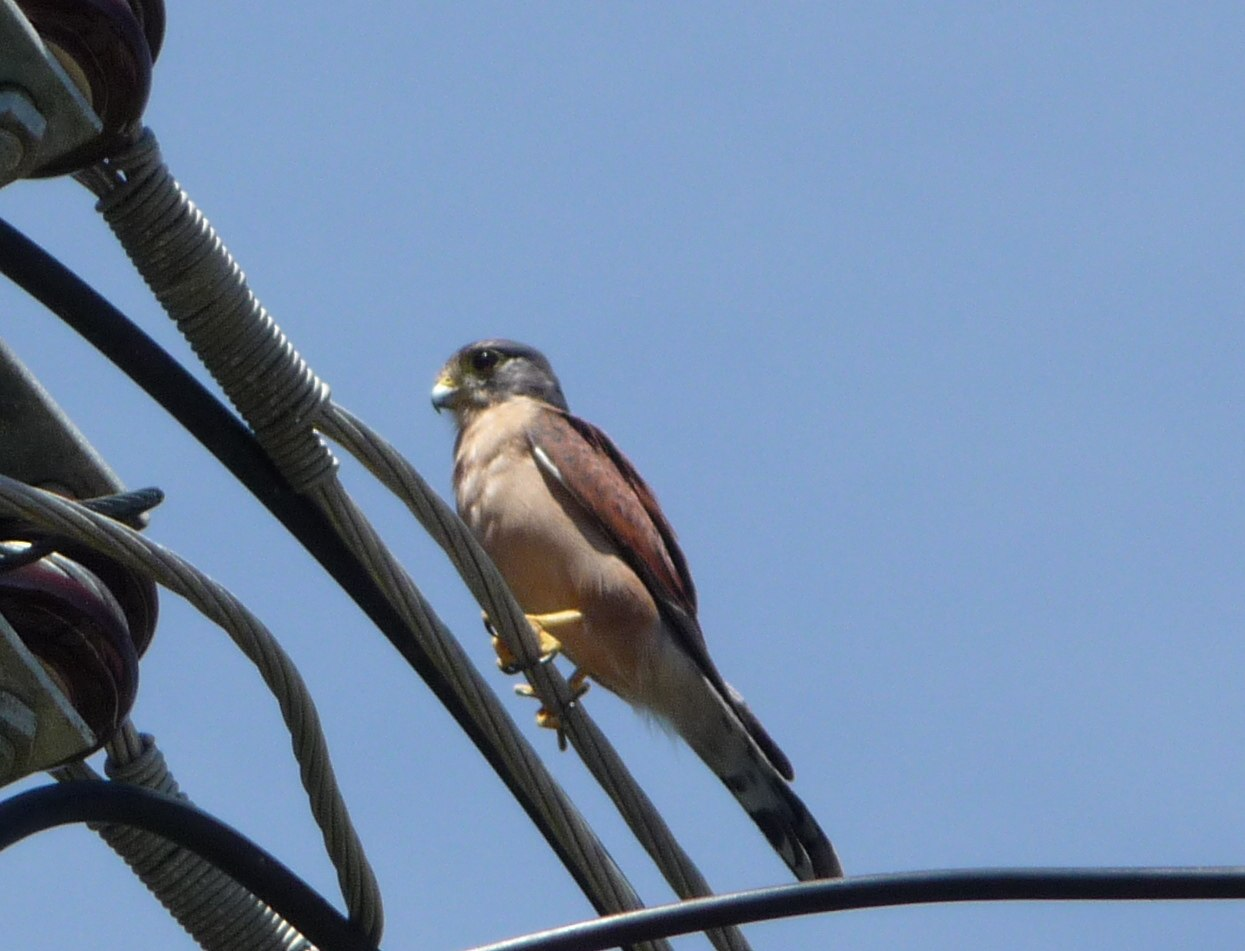

Conservation status
- Vulnerable (IUCN 3.1)
- CITES Appendix I

Scientific classification
- Kingdom: Animalia
- Phylum: Chordata
- Class: Aves
- Order: Falconiformes
- Family: Falconidae
- Genus: Falco
- Species: F. araeus

Binomial name
- Falco araeus (Oberholser, 1917)

Synonyms
- Falco araea

= Seychelles kestrel =

Species of bird

The Seychelles kestrel (Falco araeus) is a small bird of prey belonging to the genus Falco in the falcon family, Falconidae. It is endemic to the Seychelles Islands where it is the only breeding bird of prey. It is known in Seychellois Creole as the katiti after its loud, shrill call.

== Description ==
It is the smallest of the kestrels, 18–23 cm long with a wingspan of 40–45 cm. The wings are fairly short and rounded. The adult male's upperparts are reddish brown with black spots while the underparts are unspotted and buff. The head and rump are dark blue-grey. The tail is blue-grey with black bars. The bill is dark and the feet and cere are yellow. Females are similar to the males in appearance but are a little larger and paler. Immature birds have a brown, streaked head, spots on the breast and a buff tip to the tail.

== Ecology ==
It can be seen in forest, scrub and farmland and around rock faces and houses. It rarely hovers, instead feeding by sitting on an exposed perch and waiting for prey to pass, then swooping down to catch it. Lizards, particularly green day geckos (Phelsuma) and skinks (Mabuya), make up 92% of its diet and it will also take small birds, frogs, rats and insects.

The breeding territory covers just 40 hectares, the smallest of any bird of prey. Breeding occurs from August to October. The nest site is on a cliff, tree or building. It is a simple scrape with no nest material used. Two or three eggs are laid; they are white with brown markings and are incubated for 28–31 days. The young birds fledge after 35–42 days and then remain with their parents for another 14 weeks.

== Conservation ==
The species has a population of about 800 birds and is classified as vulnerable. Lowland nests have a high failure rate of about 70–80%. It probably bred throughout the granitic central Seychelles in the past but is currently known to breed only on Mahé, Silhouette, North Island, Praslin and some small adjacent islands. It was reintroduced to Praslin in 1977.

Threats are thought to include habitat loss due to logging, housing development and fires as well as predation and competition by introduced species. Rats, cats and barn owls have reduced the lizard population on which the kestrels depend and they may take eggs and chicks. Barn owls and common mynas have occupied many suitable nest sites.

Persecution by humans is now rare. In the past, kestrels were killed because they were thought to take chickens and because they were considered to be an omen of death.
