= Anse Lazio =

Beach situated in the northwest of Praslin Island, Seychelles

Coordinates: 4°17′37″S 55°42′06″E

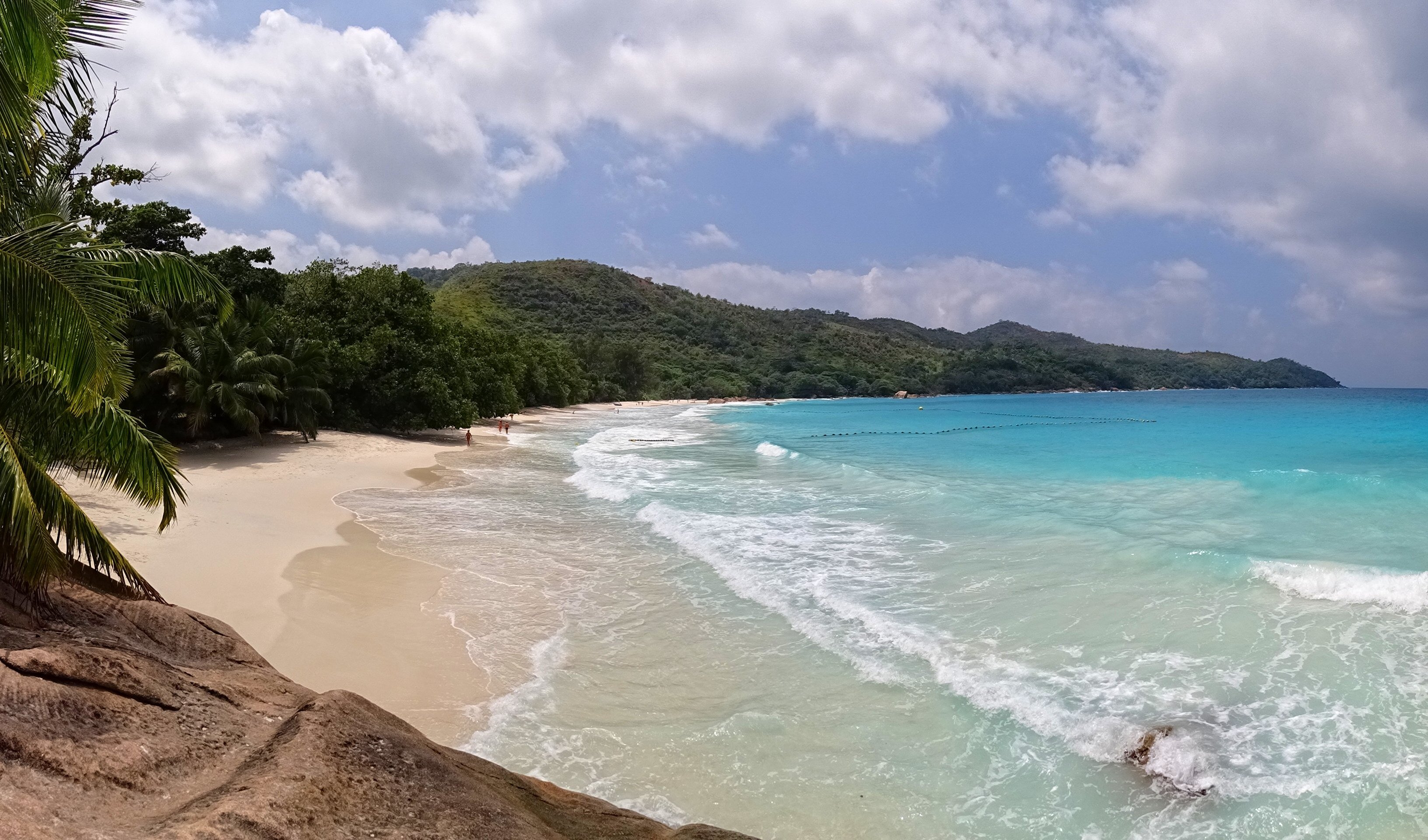
Anse Lazio seen from north-east

Anse Lazio is a beach situated in the northwest of Praslin Island, Seychelles, considered by Lonely Planet to be the "best beach on Praslin", and one of the "best in the archipelago".

== Location ==
Located to the northeast of Madagascar, east of Zanzibar and south of Socotra, in the middle of the Indian Ocean, it has clear water and scenery that can be perceived as beautiful, which attracts a large portion of Praslin's tourists.

The beach is bordered by large granite boulders. However, unlike other beaches in the Seychelles, Anse Lazio is not protected by a coral reef.

As of 2024, Anse Lazio is designated as a non-motorized beach.

== Incidents ==
Two deadly shark attacks occurred inside the Anse Lazio bay in August 2011, creating a media frenzy. The last previously known shark attack in the Seychelles was recorded in 1963. After 5 years, the safety nets were removed by the Seychelles Maritime Safety Authority.

== In media ==
- In 2016, CNN ranked Anse Lazio at number 4 in its world's top 10 beaches list.
