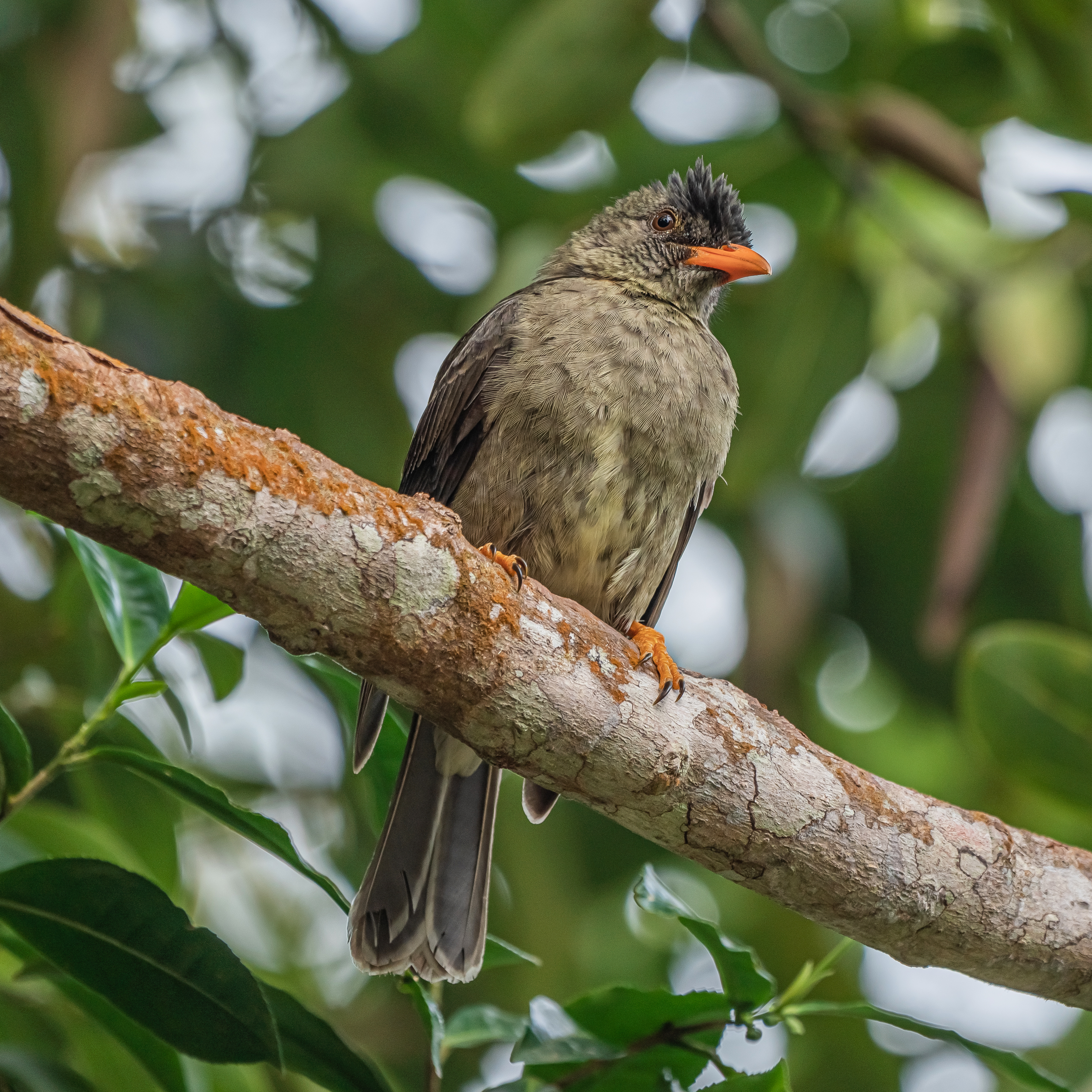

Conservation status
- Least Concern (IUCN 3.1)

Scientific classification
- Kingdom: Animalia
- Phylum: Chordata
- Class: Aves
- Order: Passeriformes
- Family: Pycnonotidae
- Genus: Hypsipetes
- Species: H. crassirostris

Binomial name
- Hypsipetes crassirostris Newton, E, 1867

= Seychelles bulbul =

Species of bird

The Seychelles bulbul (Hypsipetes crassirostris) is a member of the bulbul family of passerine birds. It is a common endemic species of the Seychelles, breeding on Mahé, Praslin, La Digue and Silhouette as well as some smaller islands.

== Taxonomy and systematics ==
Alternative names for the Seychelles bulbul include the Seychelles black bulbul and thick-billed bulbul. The species is very closely related to both the Grand Comoro bulbul and the Moheli bulbul.

== Behaviour and ecology ==
The Seychelles bulbul is social, living in pairs, family groups or small flocks in forest and woodland from the sea to the granitic mountains. The Seychelles bulbul is monogamous and territorial in the breeding season. The territory is about 200 m (660 ft) in diameter. It is defended against other bulbuls and potential predators with loud alarm calls, and even large intruders, including man, can be mobbed. A helper, probably a previous offspring, is tolerated but not allowed to approach the nest.

=== Breeding ===
The breeding season of this bird usually begins at the start of the monsoon, around October to January, although breeding can occur at any time. It builds a circular nest out of palm fibres, leaves, twigs and moss in a forked tree branch, usually 10 m or more above the ground. Two whitish eggs with spots are usually laid per season, although in most cases only one chick is successfully raised to fledging age. Incubation lasts for 15 days and fledging occurs 21 days after hatching, but young fledglings will accompany adults after fledging, possibly to learn foraging skills.

=== Food and feeding ===
The species is omnivorous, taking fruit, flowers, eggs, and insects gleaned from foliage or hawked during short flights. They are very aggressive towards other bird species, chasing away birds as large as green-backed herons from areas in which they are feeding.
