= Praslin =

Island in the Seychelles, Somali Sea

Praslin Island
Nickname: Ile de Palmes
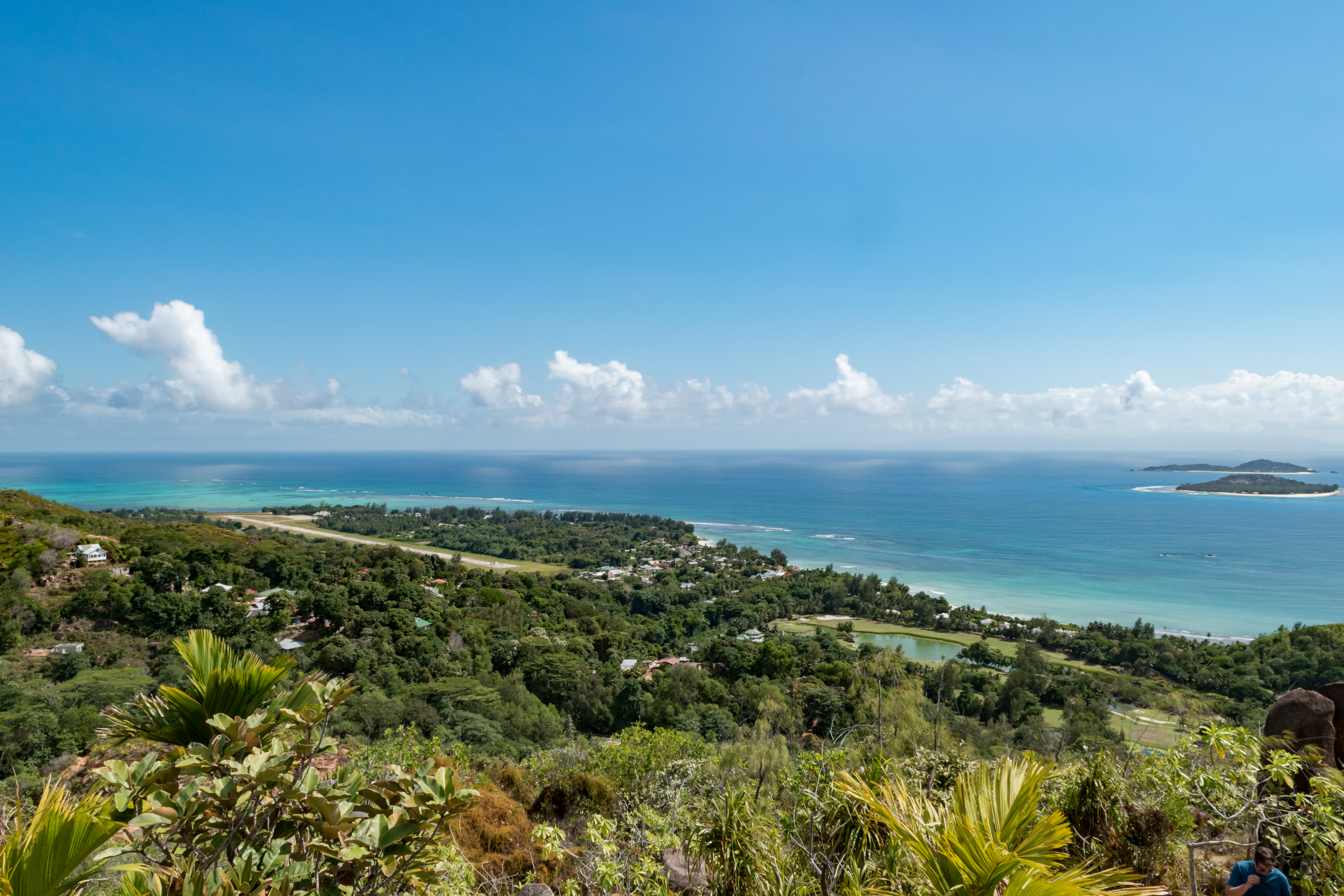

- Map of Praslin

- Location in Seychelles

Geography
- Location: Seychelles, Indian Ocean
- Coordinates: 4°19′48″S 55°44′48″E
- Archipelago: Inner Islands, Seychelles
- Adjacent to: Indian Ocean
- Total islands: 1
- Major islands: Praslin
- Area: 38.52 km^{2} (14.87 sq mi)
- Length: 12 km (7.5 mi)
- Width: 4.6 km (2.86 mi)
- Coastline: 46 km (28.6 mi)
- Highest elevation: 367 m (1204 ft)
- Highest point: Mont Azore

Administration
- Seychelles
- Group: Inner Islands
- Sub-Group: Granitic Seychelles
- Sub-Group: Praslin Islands
- Districts: Split
- Largest settlement: Baie Sainte Anne (pop. 2500)

Demographics
- Population: 7,553 (2014)
- Ethnic groups: Creole, French, East Africans, Chinese, Indians.

Additional information
- Time zone: SCT (UTC+4)
- ISO code: SC-07,14
- Official website: Official Site

Praslin (French pronunciation: [pʁalɛ̃]) is the second largest island (38.5 km^{2}) of the Inner Seychelles, lying 44 km (27 mi) northeast of Mahé. Praslin has a population of around 7,533 people and comprises two administrative districts: Baie Sainte Anne and Grand' Anse. The main settlements are the Baie Ste Anne, Anse Volbert and Grand' Anse.

== History ==
It was named Isle de Palmes by explorer Lazare Picault in 1744. During that time it was used as a hideaway by pirates and Arab merchants. In 1768 it was renamed Praslin in honor of French diplomat César Gabriel de Choiseul, duc de Praslin.

== Geography ==
Praslin is to the northeast of Mahé

Praslin is known as a tourist destination with several hotels and resorts, as well as a number of beaches such as Anse Lazio and Anse Georgette.

It has substantial tracts of tropical forests with birds such as the endemic Seychelles bulbul and the Seychelles black parrot. The Vallée de Mai Nature Preserve, established in 1979, is known for the unique coco de mer and vanilla orchids. It has been reported that General Charles George Gordon of Khartoum (1833–1885), an ardent Christian cosmologist, was convinced that Vallée de Mai was the Biblical "Garden of Eden".

Praslin is home to Praslin Island Airport, while surrounding islands include Curieuse Island, La Digue, Cousin Island, Cousine Island and Aride Island. There are a few near offshore islets including Round Island (0.193 km^{2}) and Chauve Souris (0.007 km^{2}), both of which have hotel accommodations.

A large area in the south of the island has been designated as Praslin National Park and surrounding areas Important Bird Area.

== Gallery ==
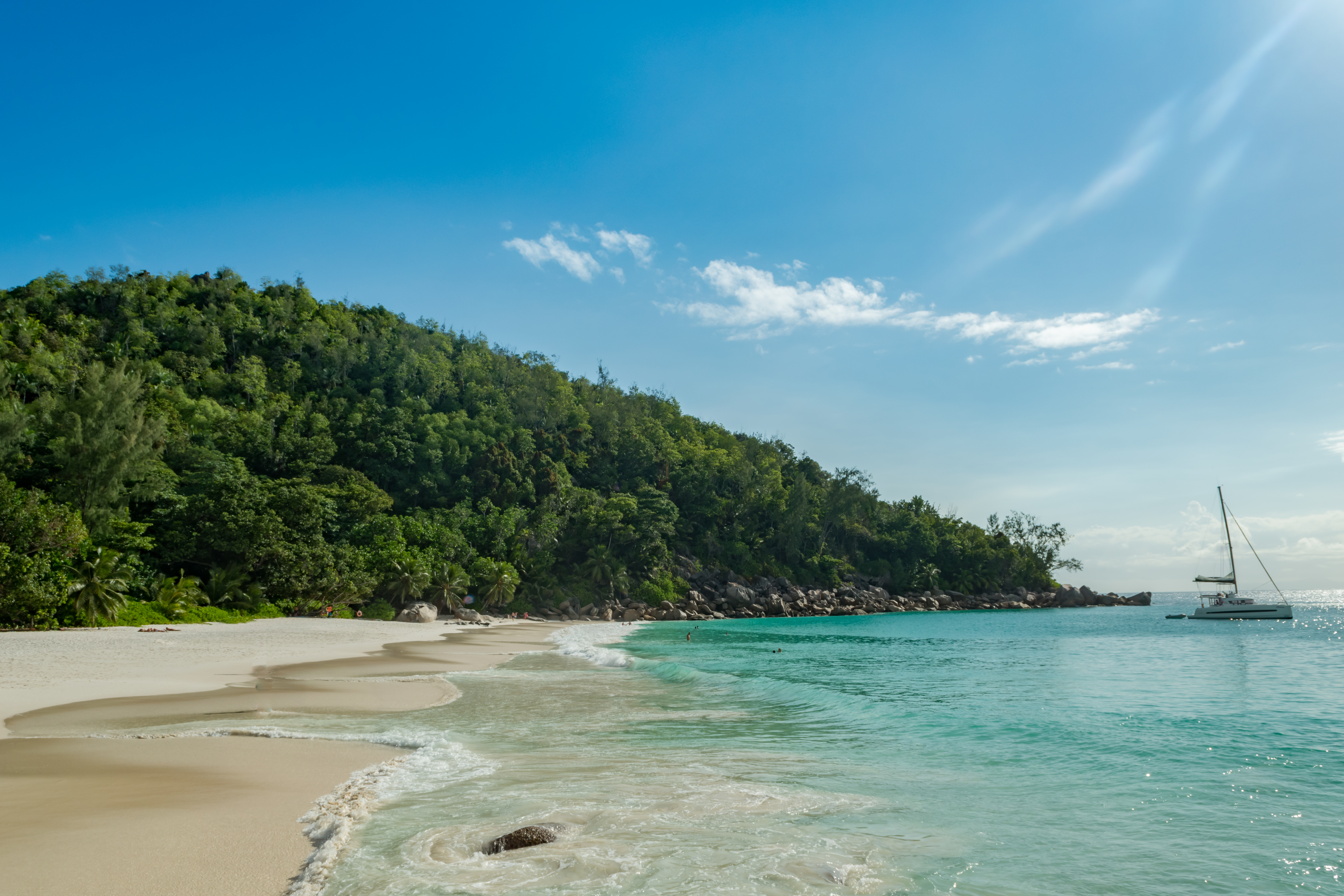
Beach Anse Georgette, Praslin

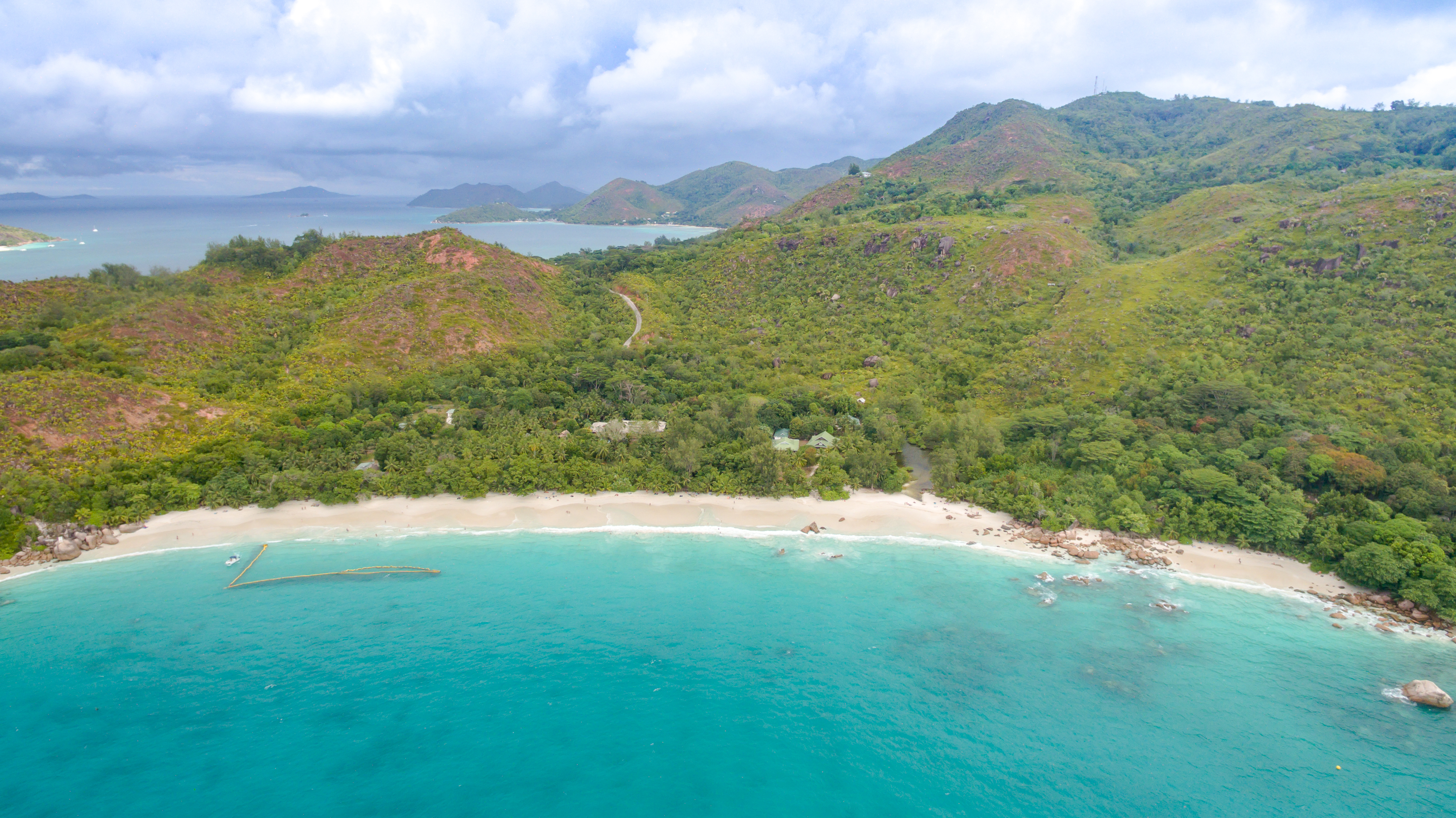
Beach Anse Lazio, Praslin

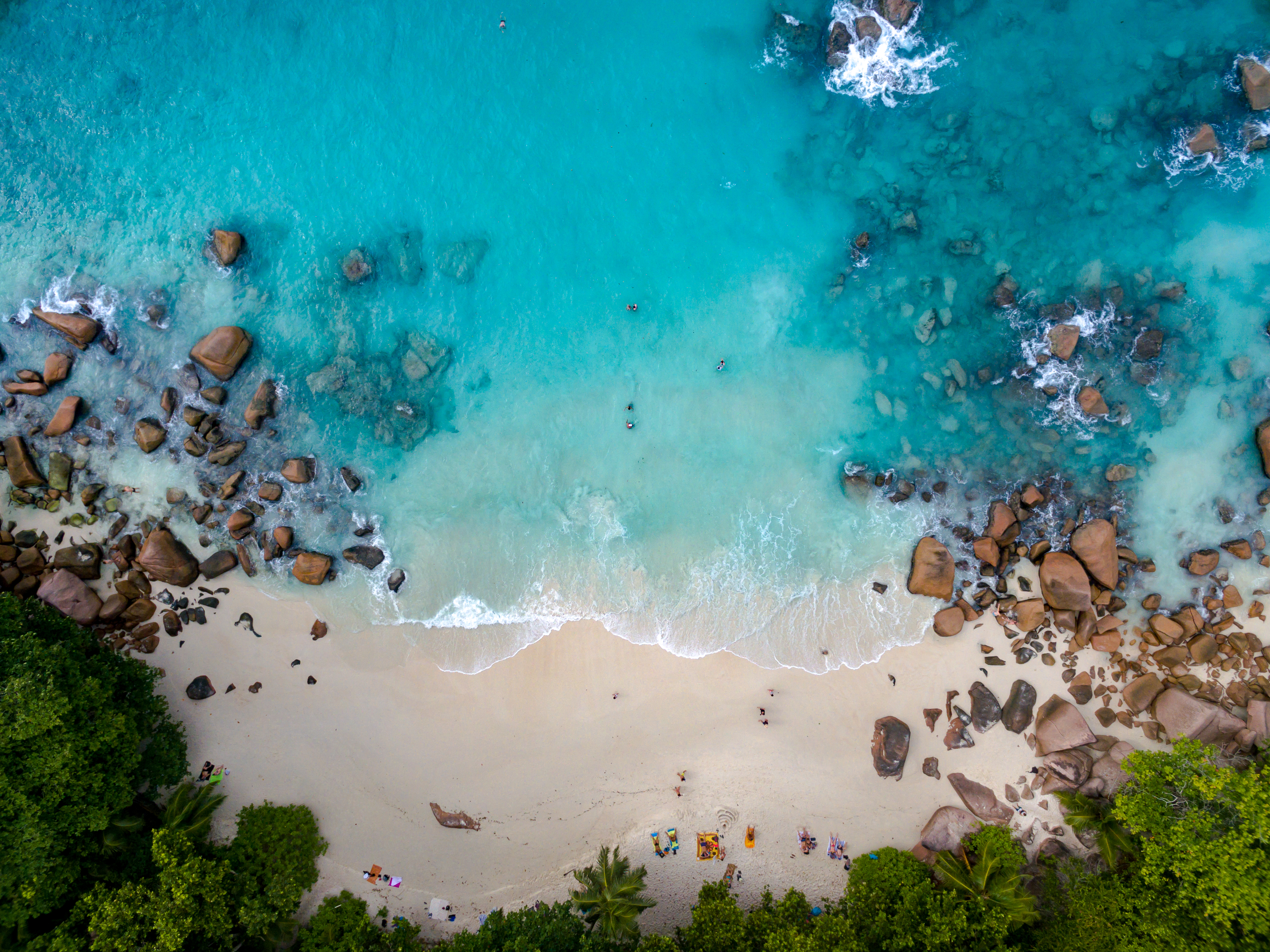
Beach Anse Lazio

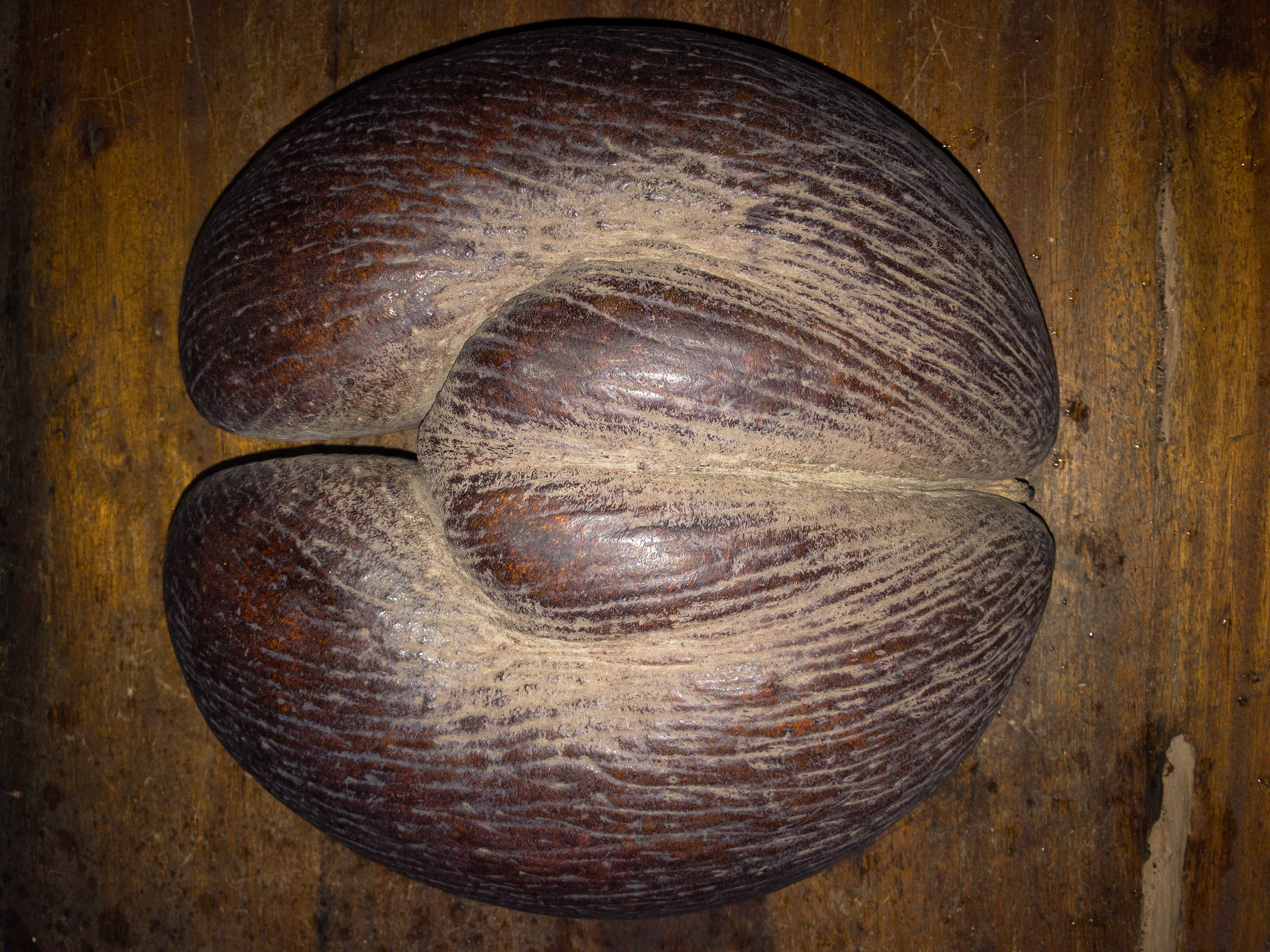
Coco de Mer from Praslin

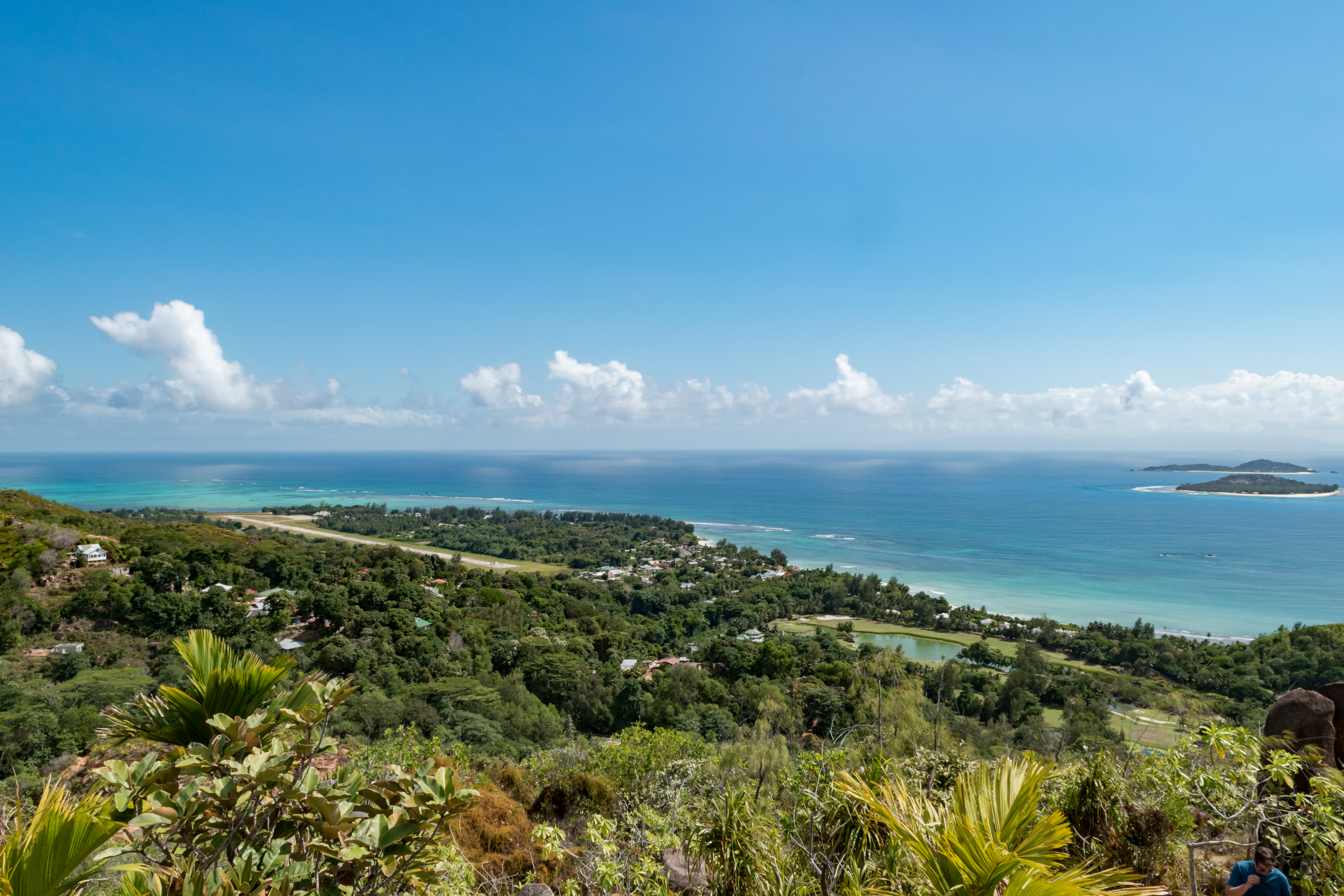
Praslin, Seychellen

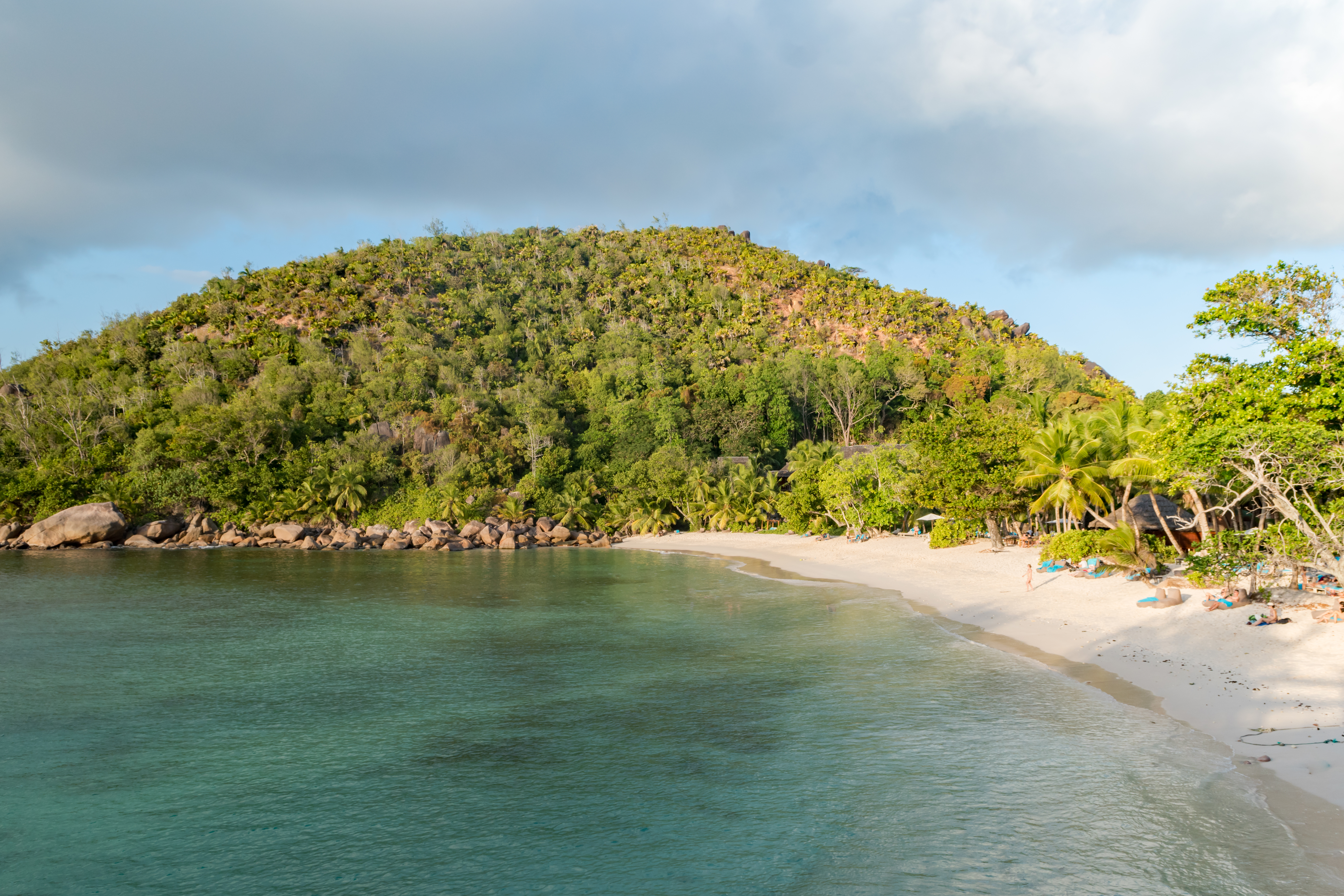
Beach Petite Anse Kerlan, Praslin

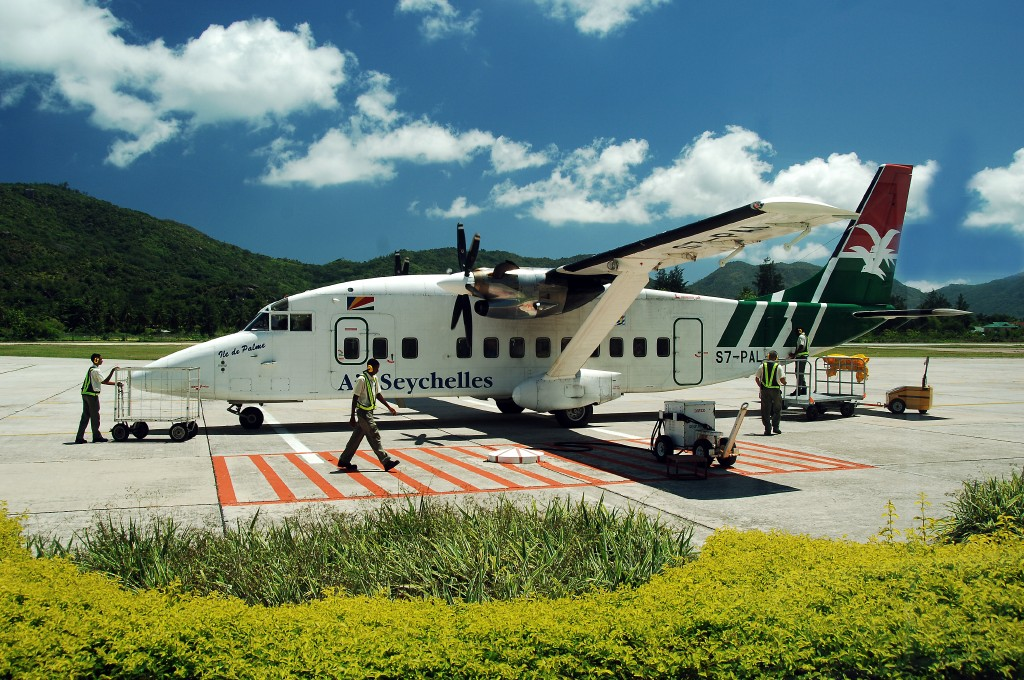
Praslin airport

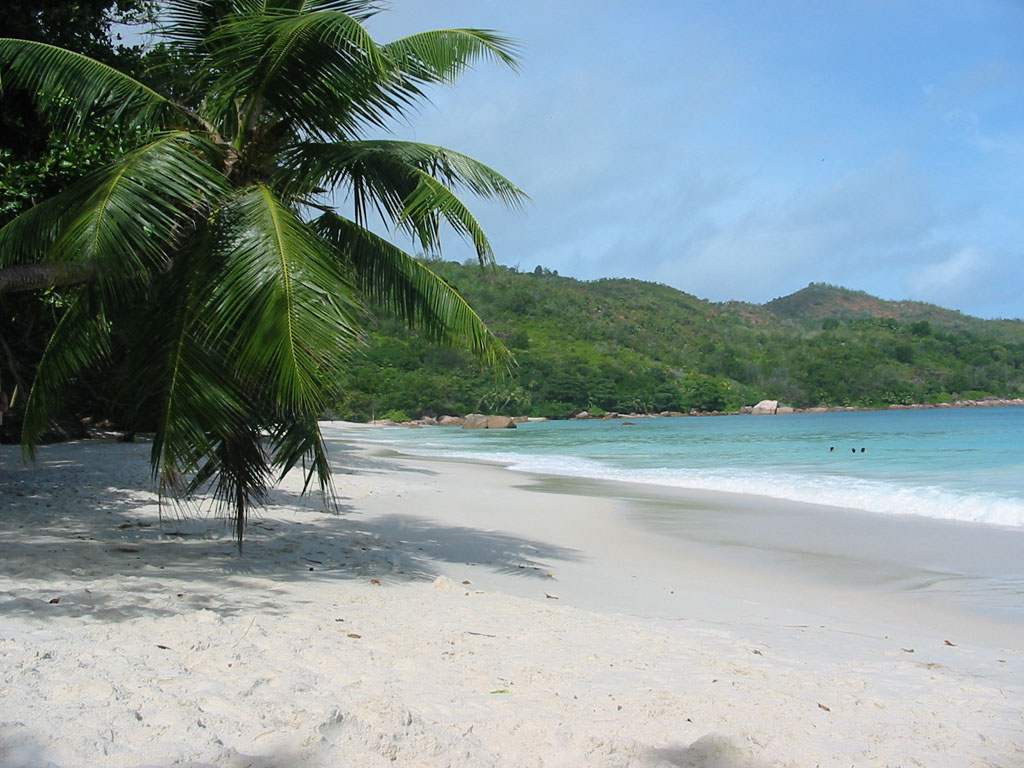
Anse Lazio Beach on Praslin

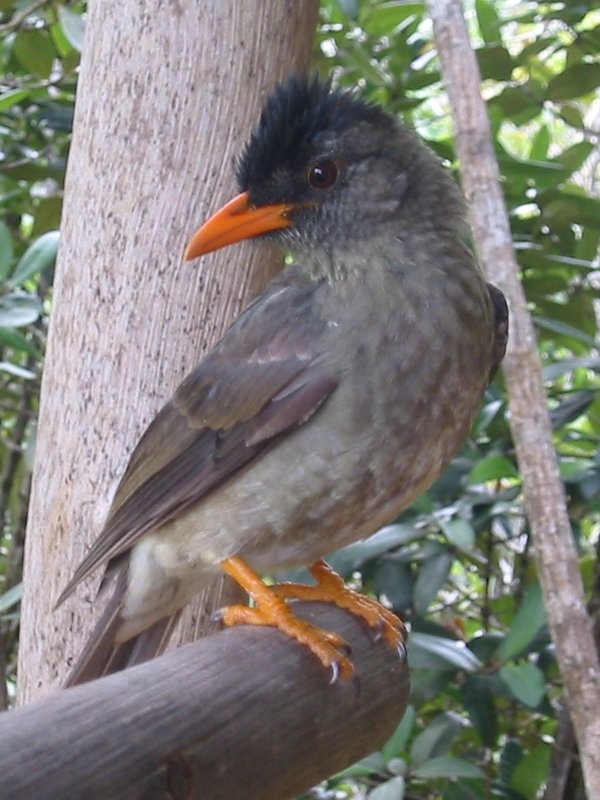
Seychelles bulbul (Hypsipetes crassirostris) on Praslin

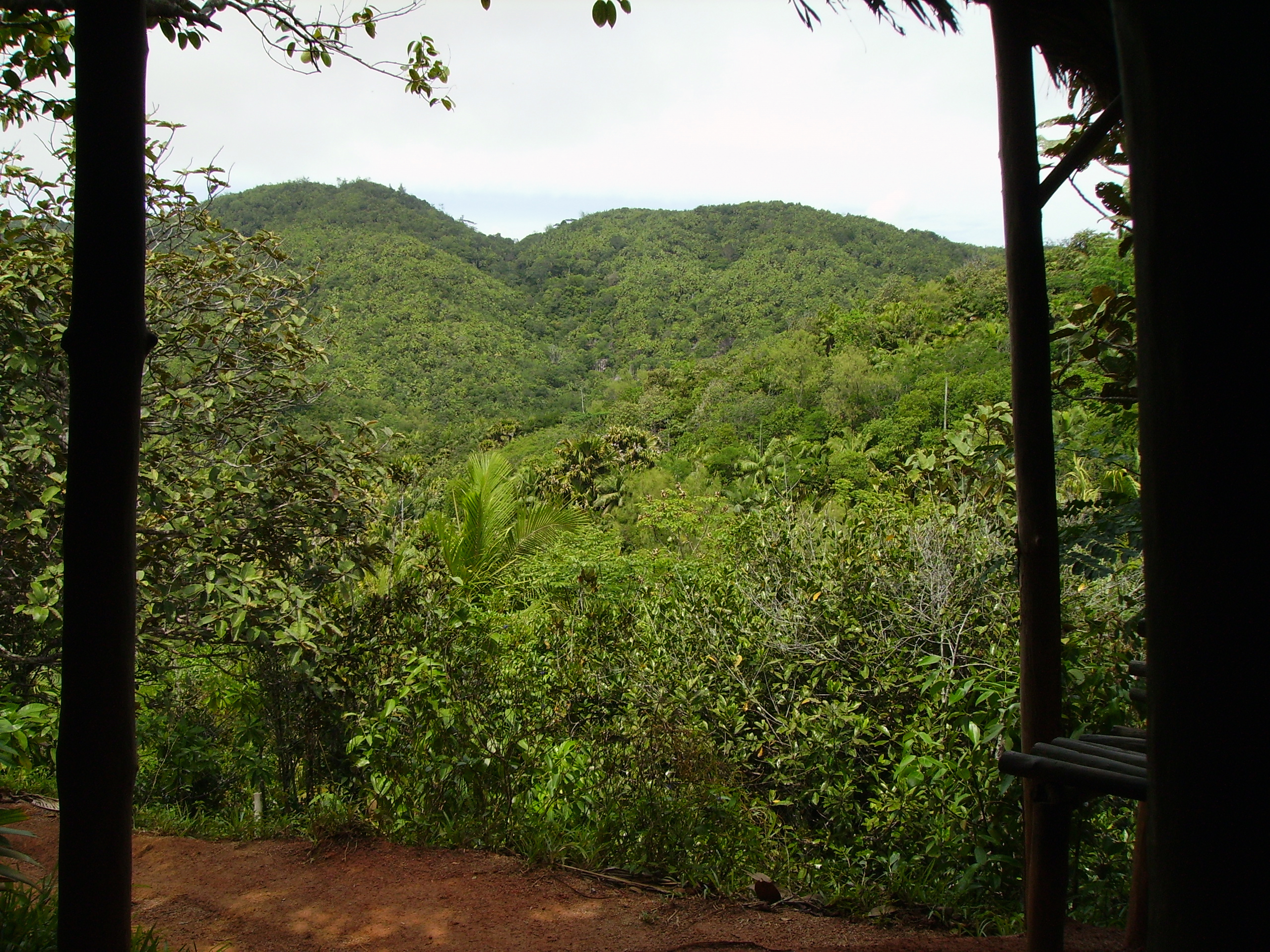
The Vallée de Mai on Praslin Island, often referred to as the Garden of Eden.

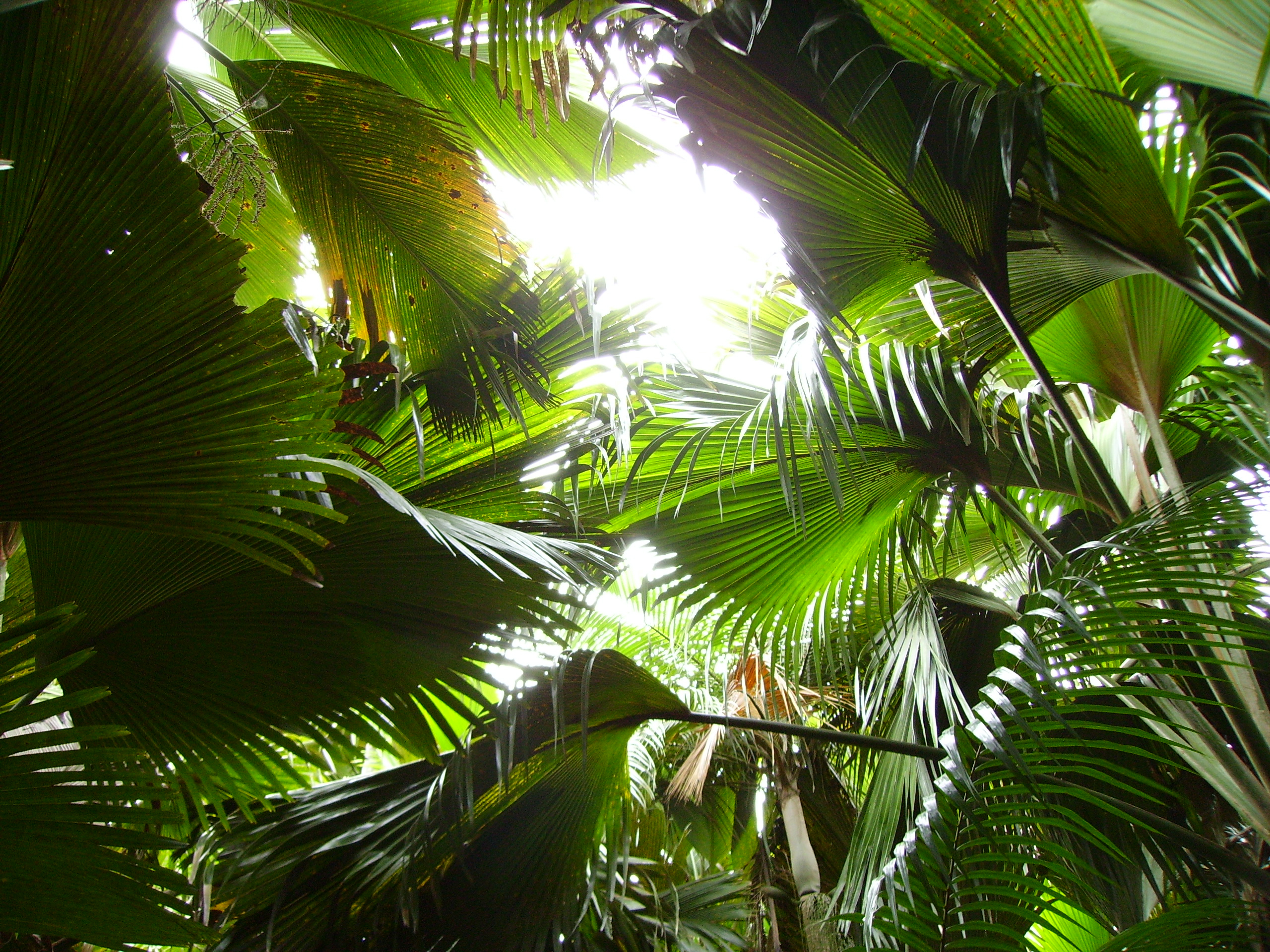
Coco de mer

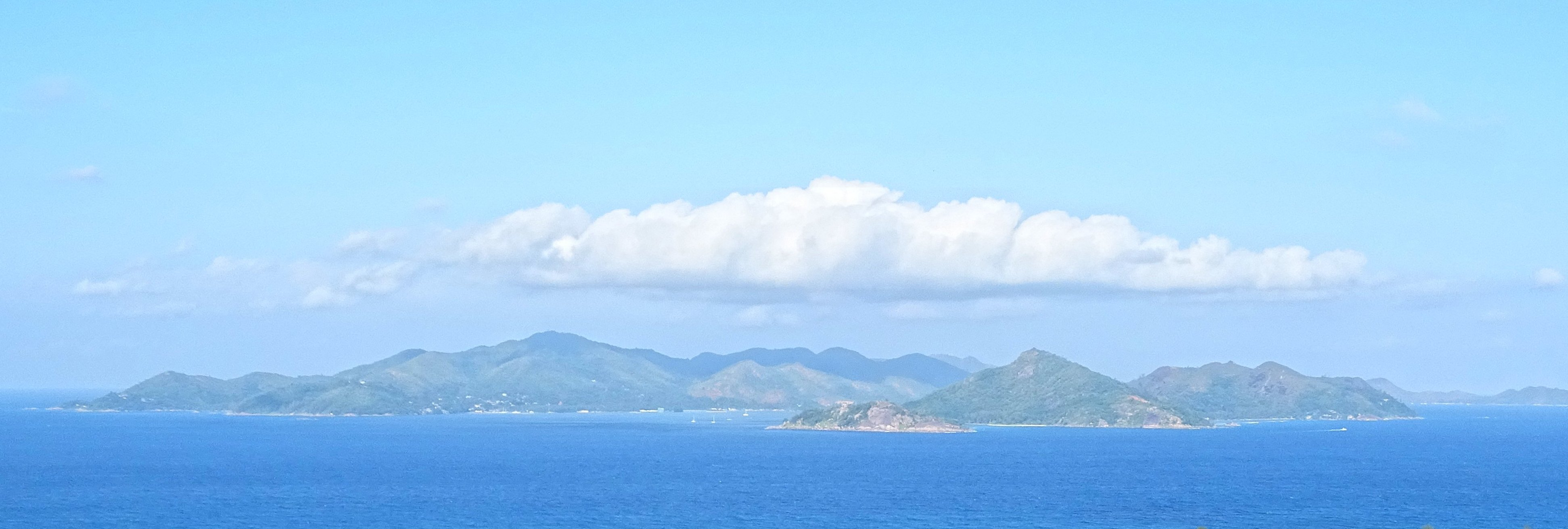
Praslin seen from the east

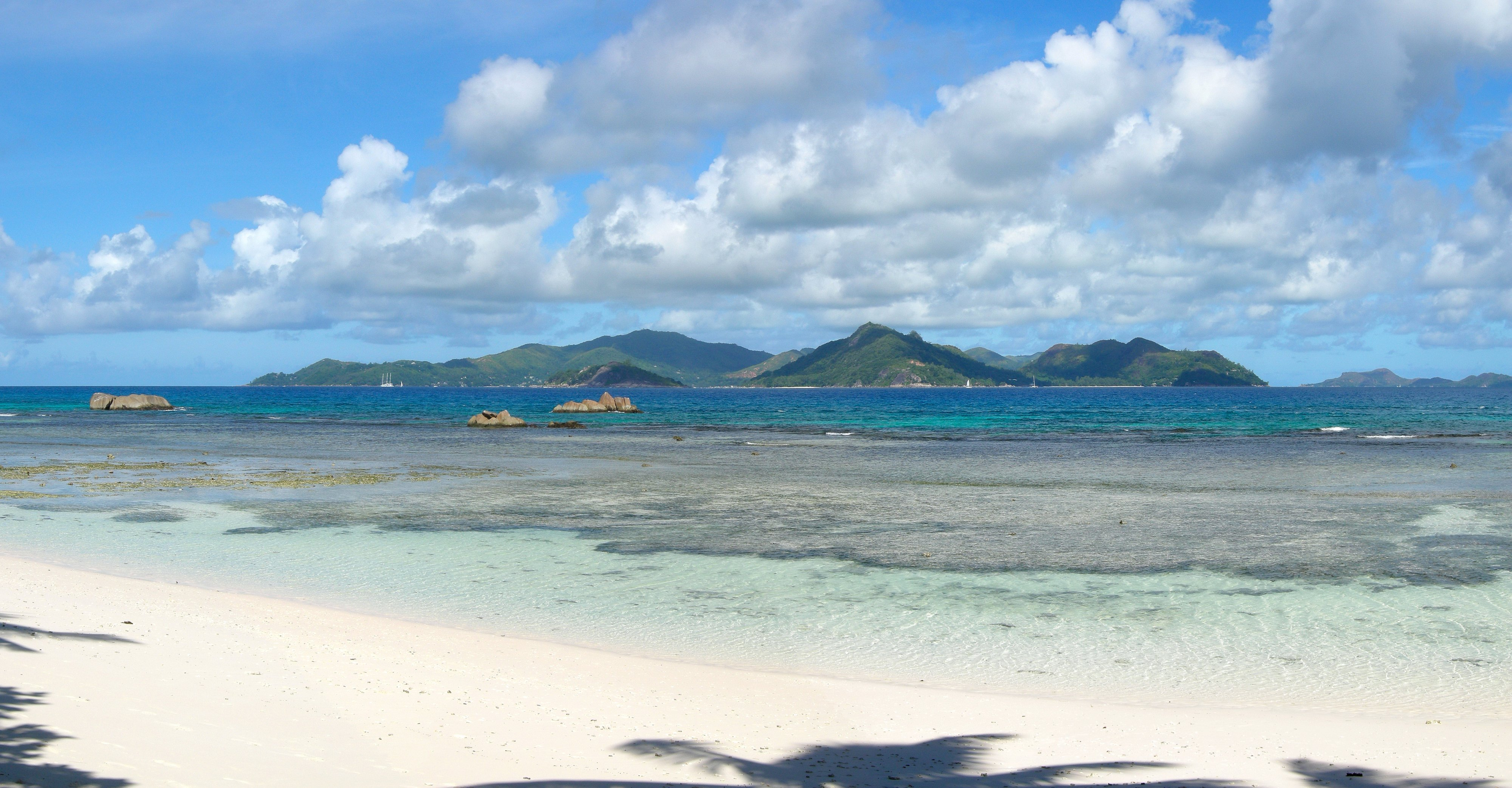
View of the second largest island of the Seychelles, Praslin, from Anse Sévère, La Digue, Seychelles
