= Nature Seychelles =

Nature Seychelles is a registered non-governmental association in Seychelles dedicated to environmental conservation. It is the national partner of BirdLife International and was formed as the replacement of Birdlife Seychelles in 1998.

It is based on Seychelles' main island, Mahé, and has a second centre on the country's second island, Praslin.

Nature Seychelles manages the Cousin Special Island Reserve, an area covering the 27 hectare Cousin Island and the waters surrounding it up to 400 metres from the high-water mark.

As the last remaining home of the near-extinct Seychelles warbler and as an important breeding site for seabirds, Cousin was purchased by the International Council for Bird Preservation (which later became BirdLife International) in 1968, and established as a nature reserve. Since then, the population of only 26 birds on Cousin Island has expanded to over 2500, with viable populations on Frégate, Cousine and Aride Island.

Conservation activities on Cousin include monitoring of the island's biodiversity, research, re-introduction of endangered species such as the Seychelles magpie-robin, ecotourism, and education. In April 2022, Nature Seychelles announced plans to developed a land-based coral farm on Praslin to produce corals that are more resilient to warming ocean temperatures.

As of December 2022, the chief executive of the NGO is Nirmal Shah.
