= Cousin Island =

Island in Seychelles

- Location within Seychelles

Geography
- Location: Seychelles, Indian Ocean
- Coordinates: 4°19′48″S 55°39′48″E
- Archipelago: Inner Islands, Seychelles
- Adjacent to: Indian Ocean
- Total islands: 1
- Major islands: Cousin
- Area: 0.34 km^{2} (0.13 sq mi)
- Length: 0.7 km (0.43 mi)
- Width: 0.5 km (0.31 mi)
- Coastline: 2.3 km (1.43 mi)
- Highest elevation: 69 m (226 ft)

Administration
- Seychelles
- Group: Inner Islands
- Sub-Group: Granitic Seychelles
- Sub-Group: Praslin Islands
- Districts: Grand'Anse Praslin
- Largest settlement: Cousin (pop. 6)

Demographics
- Population: 6 (2014)
- Pop. density: 17.6/km^{2} (45.6/sq mi)
- Ethnic groups: Creole, French, East Africans, Indians.

Additional information
- Time zone: SCT (UTC+4)
- ISO code: SC-14
- Official website: www.seychelles.travel/en/discover/the-islands/

Cousin Island is a small (29 ha) granitic island of the Seychelles, lying 2 km (1.2 mi) west of Praslin. It is a nature reserve protected under Seychelles law as a Special Reserve. It is managed by Nature Seychelles, a national nonprofit organization and Partner of BirdLife International, by which it has been identified as an Important Bird Area.

== Description ==
Map showing location of Cousin Island (red circle) in relation to Praslin.

A plateau covered with indigenous woodland extends over most of the island, which is almost encircled by a long sandy beach. The southern coast is rocky. A 69 m (226 ft) hill occupies the centre of the island's southern half. There is an area of mangroves and three small, freshwater swamps. A marine reserve, protecting coral reefs, extends 400 m (1,300 ft) into the sea from the shoreline.

== History ==
The island was formerly a coconut plantation that had been stripped of much of its native vegetation. The endemic Seychelles warbler had become almost extinct, with a population of only 26 birds. In 1968 BirdLife International, at the time known as the International Council for Bird Preservation (ICBP), bought the island and removed young coconut trees, thus allowing the native vegetation to regenerate and native fauna to recover. It was declared a special reserve in 1975.

== Flora and fauna ==
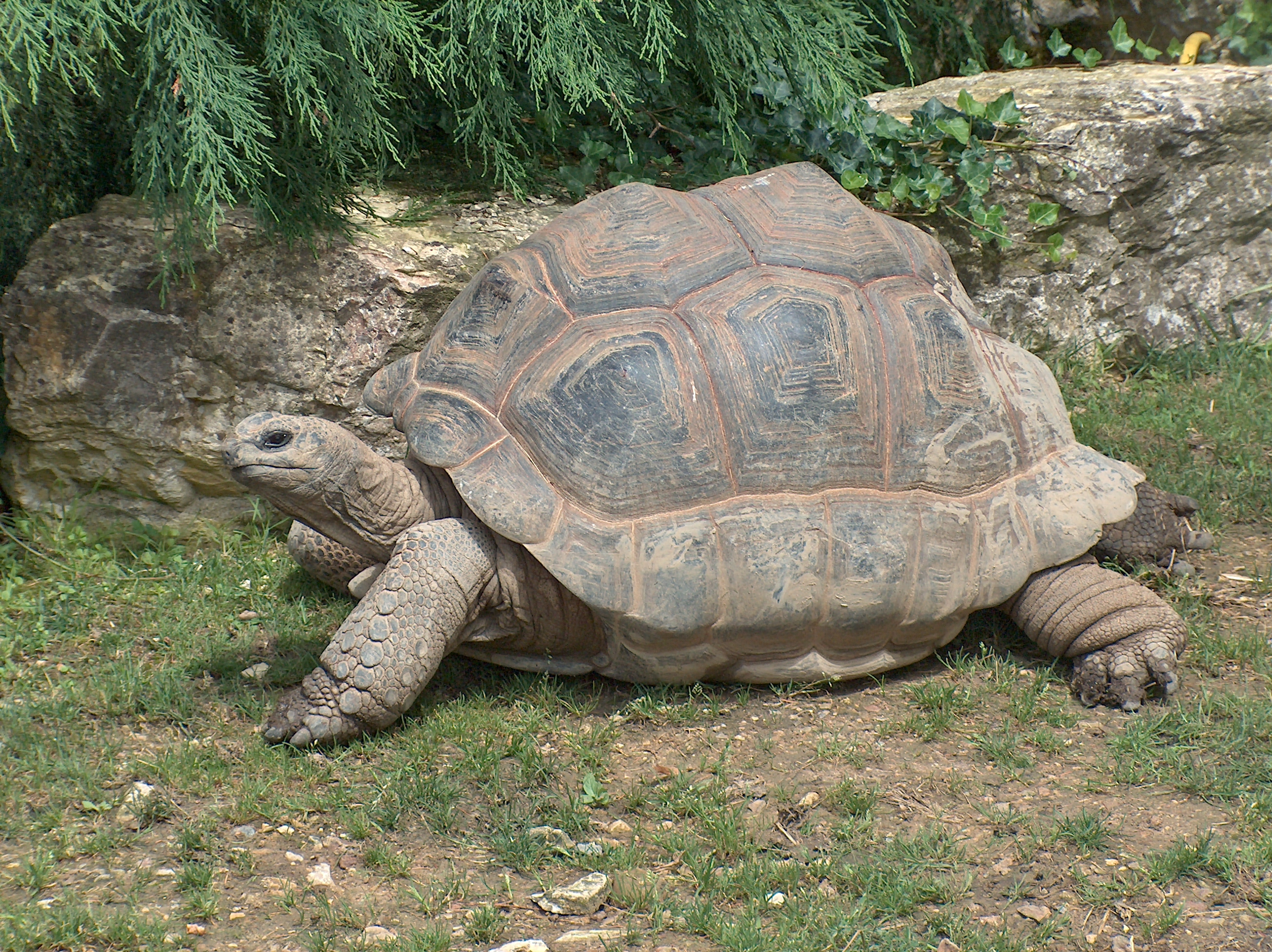
Aldabra giant tortoise

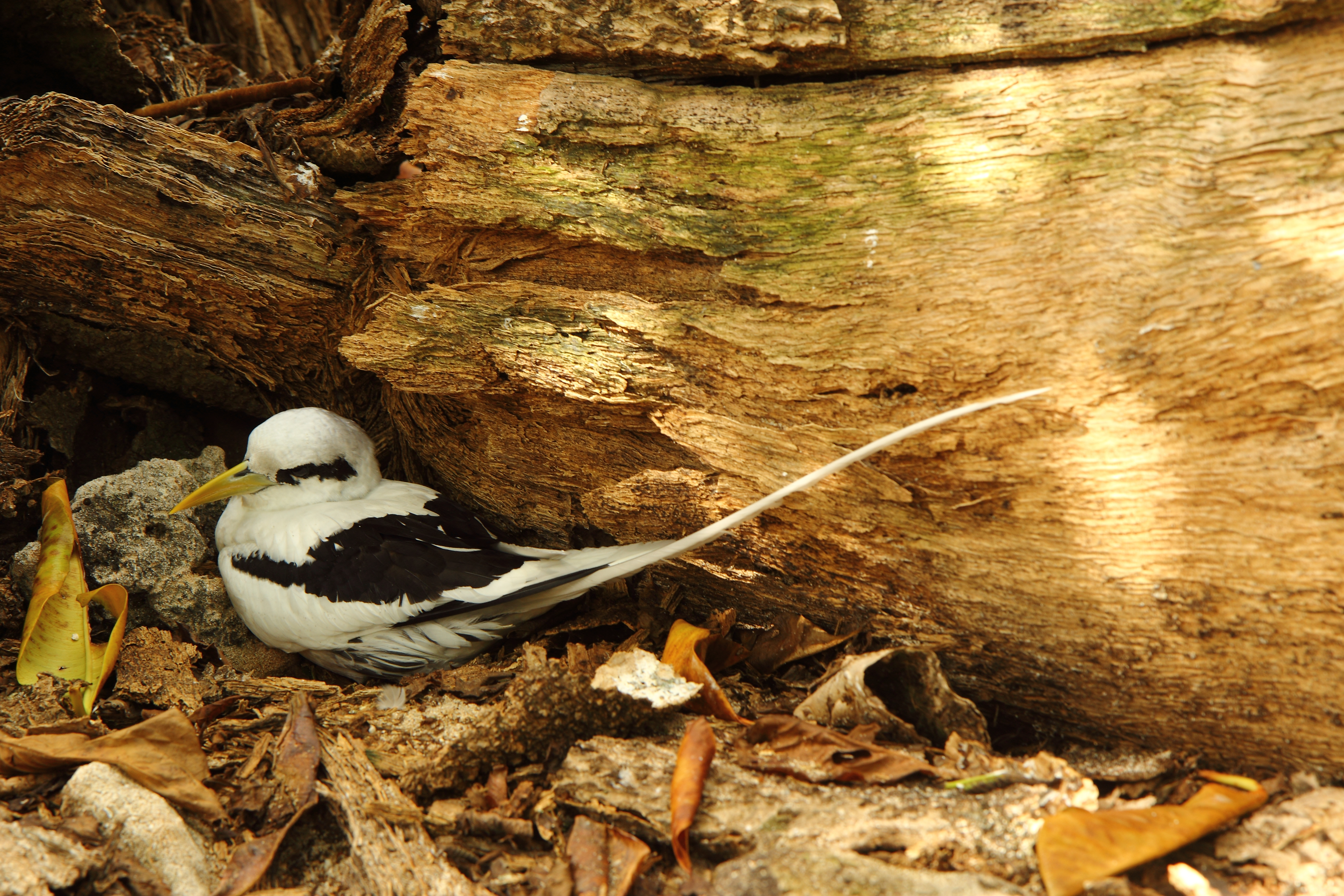
White-tailed tropicbird, one of several bird species nesting on the island

The island's woodland is dominated by Pisonia grandis, Morinda citrifolia and Ochrosia oppositifolia trees. Casuarina equisetifolia trees and Coconut palms fringe the coast. The rocky southern part of the island is characterised by Pandanus balfourii, Ficus reflexa, Ficus lutea and Euphorbia pyrifolia shrubs, with tall herbs and ferns.

There are several species of endemic Seychelles lizards on the island, the skinks Mabuya wrightii, M. seychellensis and Pamelascincus gardineri and the geckos Phelsuma astriata and Ailuronyx sechellensis, as well as a freshwater turtle Pelusios subniger and 12 Aldabra giant tortoises. It is an important nesting site for hawksbill turtles and, occasionally, green turtles. The island is free of rats. Indian hares have been introduced but are not considered harmful to the vegetation.

=== Birds ===
The island was the last refuge of the Seychelles warbler, with only 26–29 individual birds left in 1959. Following conservation efforts the population began to recover and birds were translocated to other islands. In 1999, the population on Cousin was 353 birds with 104 occupied territories. The total warbler population has since grown to some 3000 birds. The island is one of only four that host the Seychelles fody, with an estimated 800–1,200 birds in 1997. A small breeding population of Seychelles magpie-robin was established in 1995, with three pairs translocated from Frégate; in 1997, the population had increased to 25 birds in four occupied territories. Other landbirds present include the endemic Seychelles sunbird and Seychelles blue pigeon as well as the Malagasy turtle dove.

The island hosts over 300,000 nesting seabirds of seven species. A large colony, dominated by lesser noddies, but including about 1300 pairs of brown noddies, is present from May to September during the south-east monsoon. During the north-west monsoon, the hill supports a breeding colony of wedge-tailed shearwaters. Year-round breeders include white and bridled terns, white-tailed tropicbirds and some 1000–1,500 pairs of tropical shearwaters. Several hundred great and lesser frigatebirds use the island for roosting and can be seen soaring over it. Some waders are present throughout the year, the commonest being the ruddy turnstone. Common moorhens and striated herons also breed on the island.

== Conservation ==
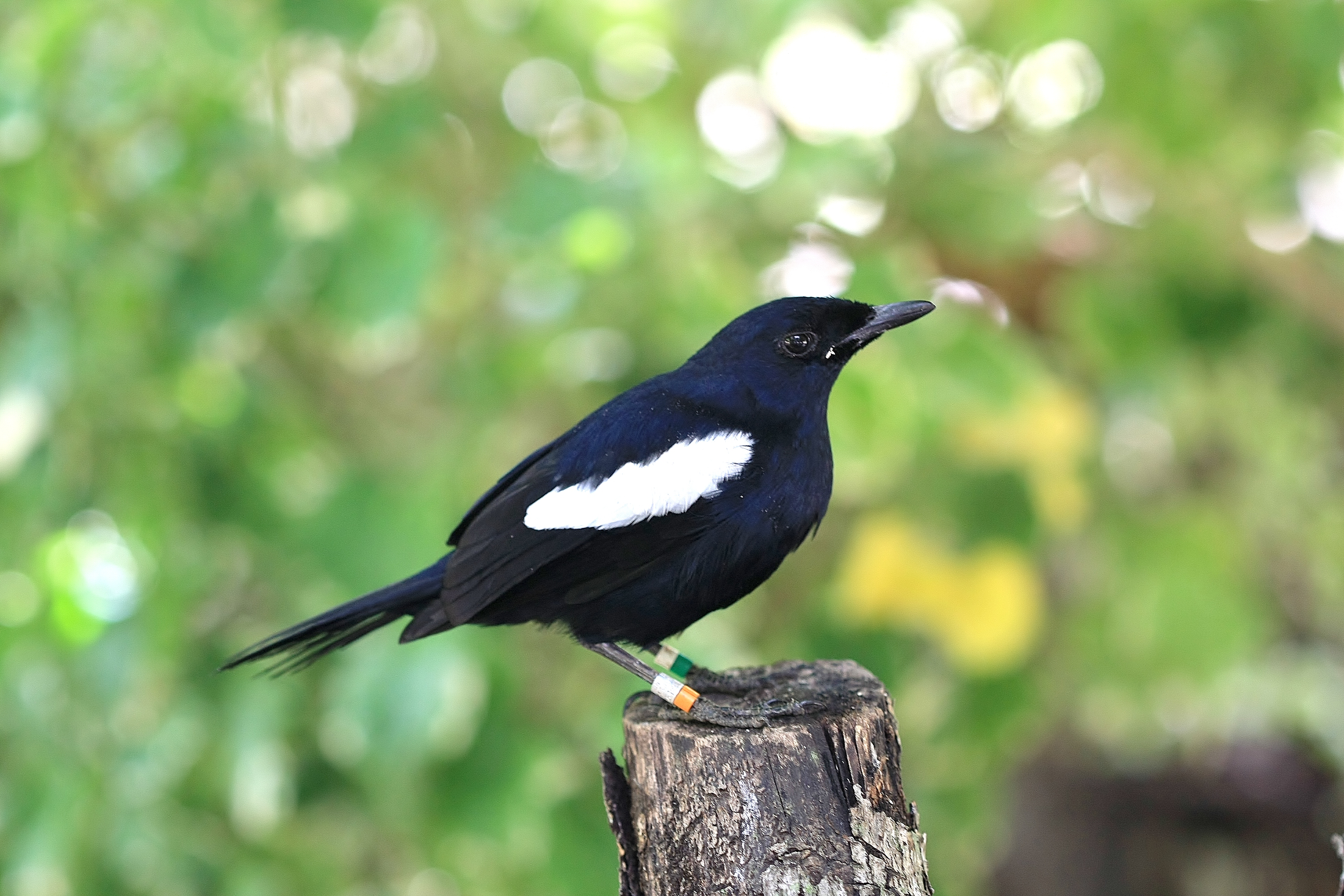
Seychelles magpie-robin, an example of successful conservation work on the island

The island is known as a site for good practice in environmental management and has been the focus of many case studies. It is used by international research organisations and universities as a research base. It is a Demonstration Site for the International Coral Reef Action Network (ICRAN). Its ecotourism program has won several prizes including the Condé Nast ecotourism award and a Tourism for Tomorrow award. It is linked to other privately owned islands that contain endemic biodiversity through the Island Conservation Centre on Praslin island, funded by a World Bank/Global Environment Facility project. The Centre aims to increase awareness of conservation efforts on Cousin and elsewhere through displays, educational programs and work with grass roots groups.

== Access ==
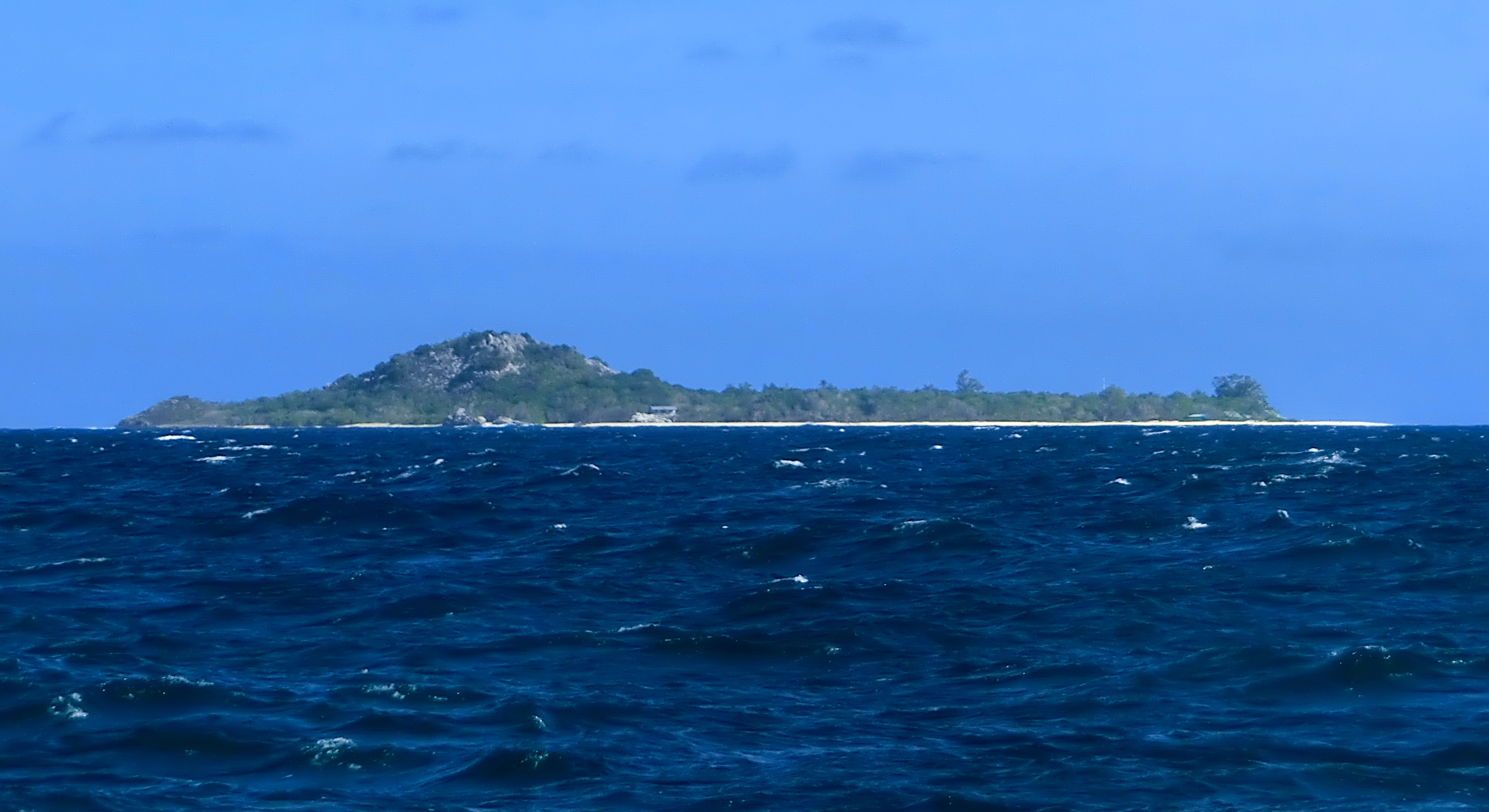
Cousin Island with its distinctive hill

The island is accessible by sea from Praslin, or the neighbouring resort island of Cousine. It is open to visitors every morning, Monday to Friday, but is closed at weekends and on public holidays.
