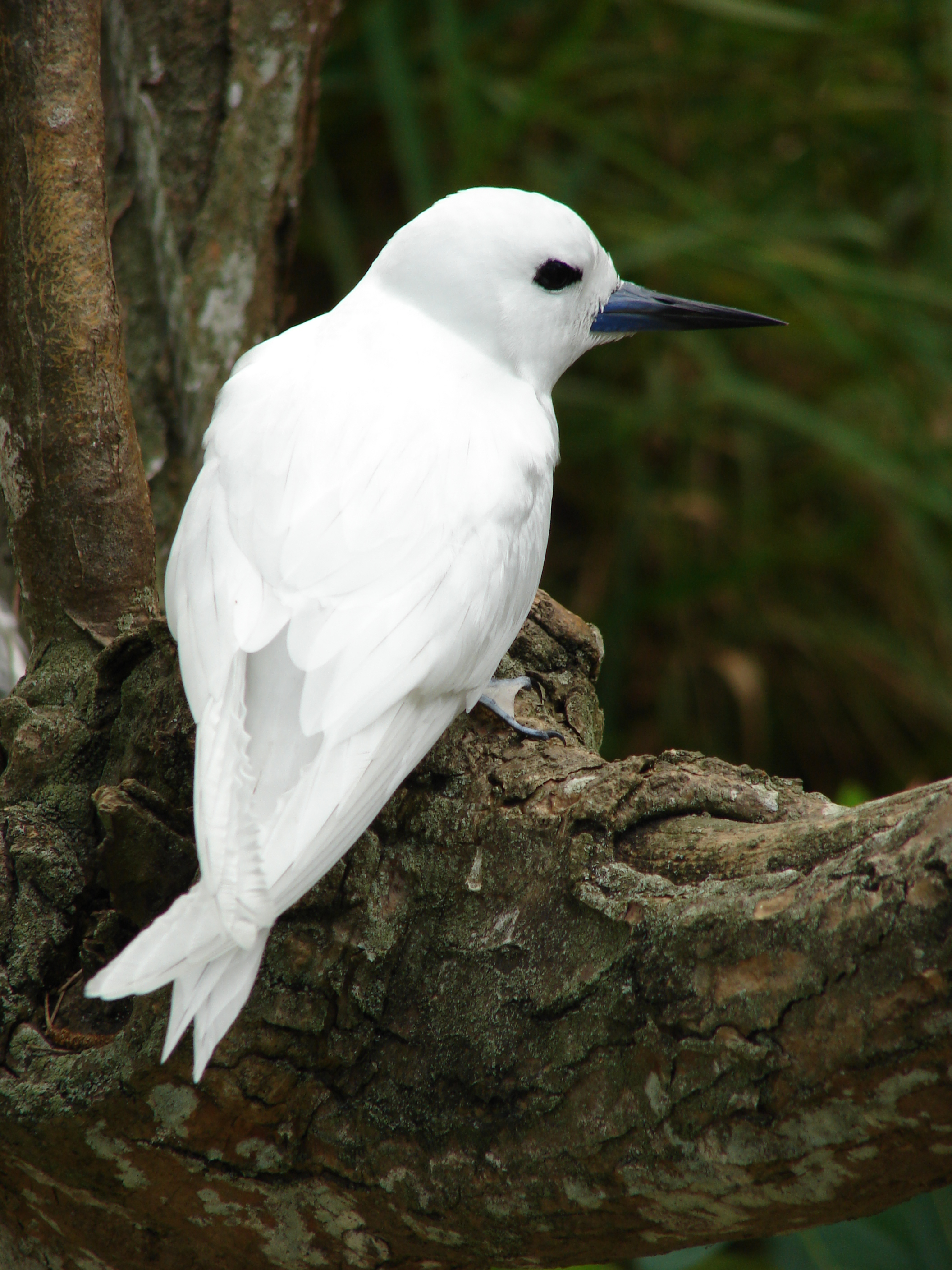

Conservation status
- Least Concern (IUCN 3.1)

Scientific classification
- Kingdom: Animalia
- Phylum: Chordata
- Class: Aves
- Order: Charadriiformes
- Family: Laridae
- Genus: Gygis
- Species: G. candida

Binomial name
- Gygis candida (Gmelin, 1789)

= Blue-billed white tern =

Species of seabird

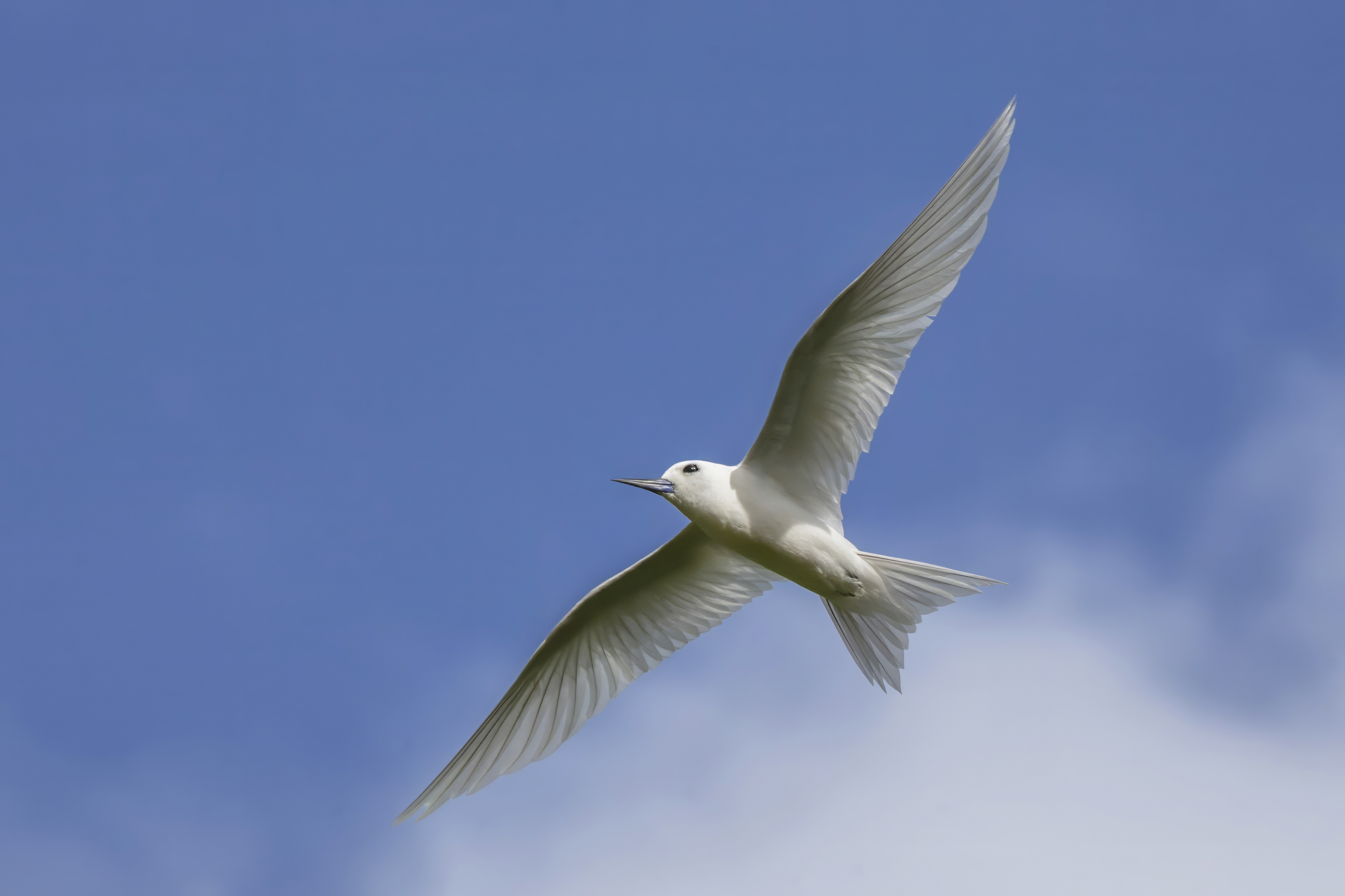
Blue-billed white tern in flight in the Cook Islands

The blue-billed white tern (Gygis candida) is a small tern found in Pacific and Indian oceans. This species was previously considered as conspecific with the Atlantic white tern (Gygis alba) and the little white tern (Gygis microrhyncha), but is now recognised as a separate species. It is known as manu-o-kū in Hawaiian. In the Cook Islands, it is known as the kakaia.

== Taxonomy ==
The blue-billed white tern was first formally described by the German ornithologist Johann Friedrich Gmelin in 1789. The species epithet is from Latin candidus (white). Among the terns, it is with the other white terns most closely related to the noddies in the genus Anous.

Two subspecies are recognised:

- Gygis candida candida (Gmelin, 1789) – tropical regions of the Indian Ocean (Seychelles, Mascarene Islands, Chagos Archipelago and Maldives) and the Pacific Ocean (Lord Howe Island, Norfolk Island, Kermadec Islands, Hawaii, Clipperton Island, Cocos Island and Malpelo Island)
- Gygis candida leucopes (Holyoak and Thibault, 1976) – Henderson Island, Pitcairn Island

== Description ==
It is a small tern, 25–30 cm (9.8–11.8 in) long, with a double-lobed tail, with both the innermost and outermost tail feathers shorter than the others, the longest being the second and third in from each side, a feature shared with the noddies but not other terns. The plumage is all-white, except for a very small black patch around the eyes; the eyes are also black. The bill is black with blue in the base, hence its name. The shape of the bill is thick and "daggerlike" with a sharp-pointed tip. The legs are slaty-blue, with yellow or white webs.

The juvenile is similar to the adult, except the body and wing feathers are fringed with pale brown, and the bill is all-black, including the base.

== Relationship with humans ==
The white tern, manu-o-kū, was named Honolulu, Hawaiʻi's official bird on April 2, 2007.

== Threats and predation ==
Giant tortoises have been observed to hunt chicks of this bird on Fregate Island in the Seychelles.
