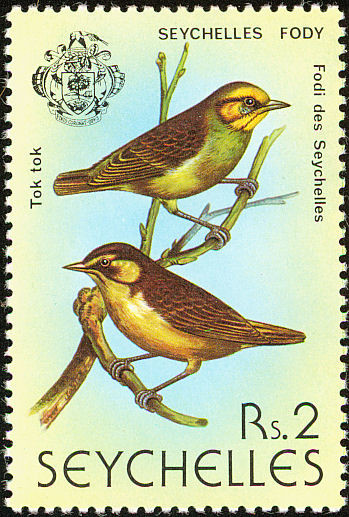
- on a 1979 stamp of Seychelles
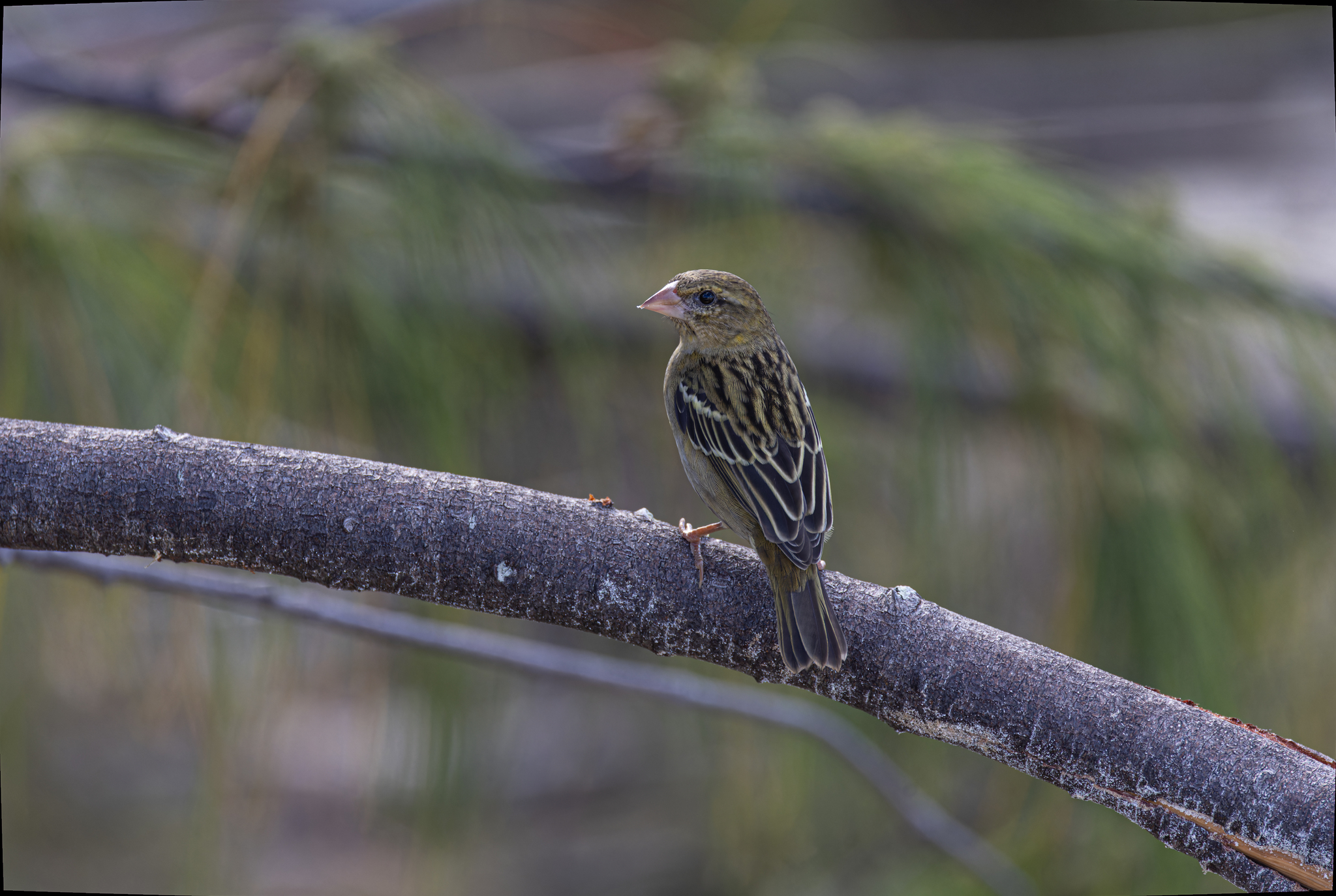

Conservation status
- Near Threatened (IUCN 3.1)

Scientific classification
- Kingdom: Animalia
- Phylum: Chordata
- Class: Aves
- Order: Passeriformes
- Family: Ploceidae
- Genus: Foudia
- Species: F. sechellarum

Binomial name
- Foudia sechellarum E. Newton, 1867

= Seychelles fody =

Species of bird

The Seychelles fody (Foudia sechellarum) is a small yellowish songbird that are native to the Seychelles islands of Cousin Island, Cousine Island, Frégate Island, and have been introduced to Aride Island, D'Arros Island and as of 2004 Denis Island. Their natural habitat is woodland, but they have adapted to living in such habitats as coconut plantations and gardens.

== Description ==
The male Seychelles fody has a yellow face in breeding plumage which the female lacks. The plumage is in general a drab olive and the beak is black. This bird grows to a length of about 12.5 cm (5 in). The female and juvenile resembles the female and juvenile red fody (Foudia madagascariensis), but can be distinguished by having upper parts with less streaking.

== Ecology ==
The Seychelles fody feeds mainly on insects and other small arthropods, as well as eating fruit, nectar and seeds. It has been known to feed on the eggs of seabirds such as the White tern. The diet includes bugs, beetles, ants and spiders. On Cousin, this bird has a clearly defined breeding season, between May and September, after which period it moults. On some other islands it seems to breed throughout the year. It shares the same habitat in the Seychelles with a related introduced species, the red fody.

== Status ==
The International Union for Conservation of Nature has recently changed the status of the bird from "endangered" to "near threatened" due to successful conservation efforts by Nature Seychelles. Presently it is estimated that there are approximately 3500 Seychelles fodies. Introductions, by relocating birds to predator-free islands, have helped the birds to increase their numbers and newly introduced birds to the island of Aride managed three breeding attempts in the first thirteen months they were there.
