= FRK =

FRK may refer to:

- Federation of Russian Canadians
- Finnish Red Cross (Swedish: Finlands Röda Kors)
- Frankish language
- Frégate Island Airport, in the Seychelles
- Fructokinase
- Funmilayo Ransome-Kuti
- Fyn-related kinase
- Martin Frk (born 1993), Czech ice hockey player
