= Aride Island =

Island in Seychelles

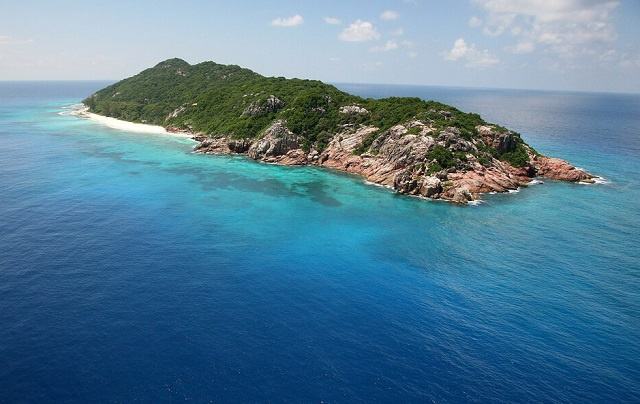

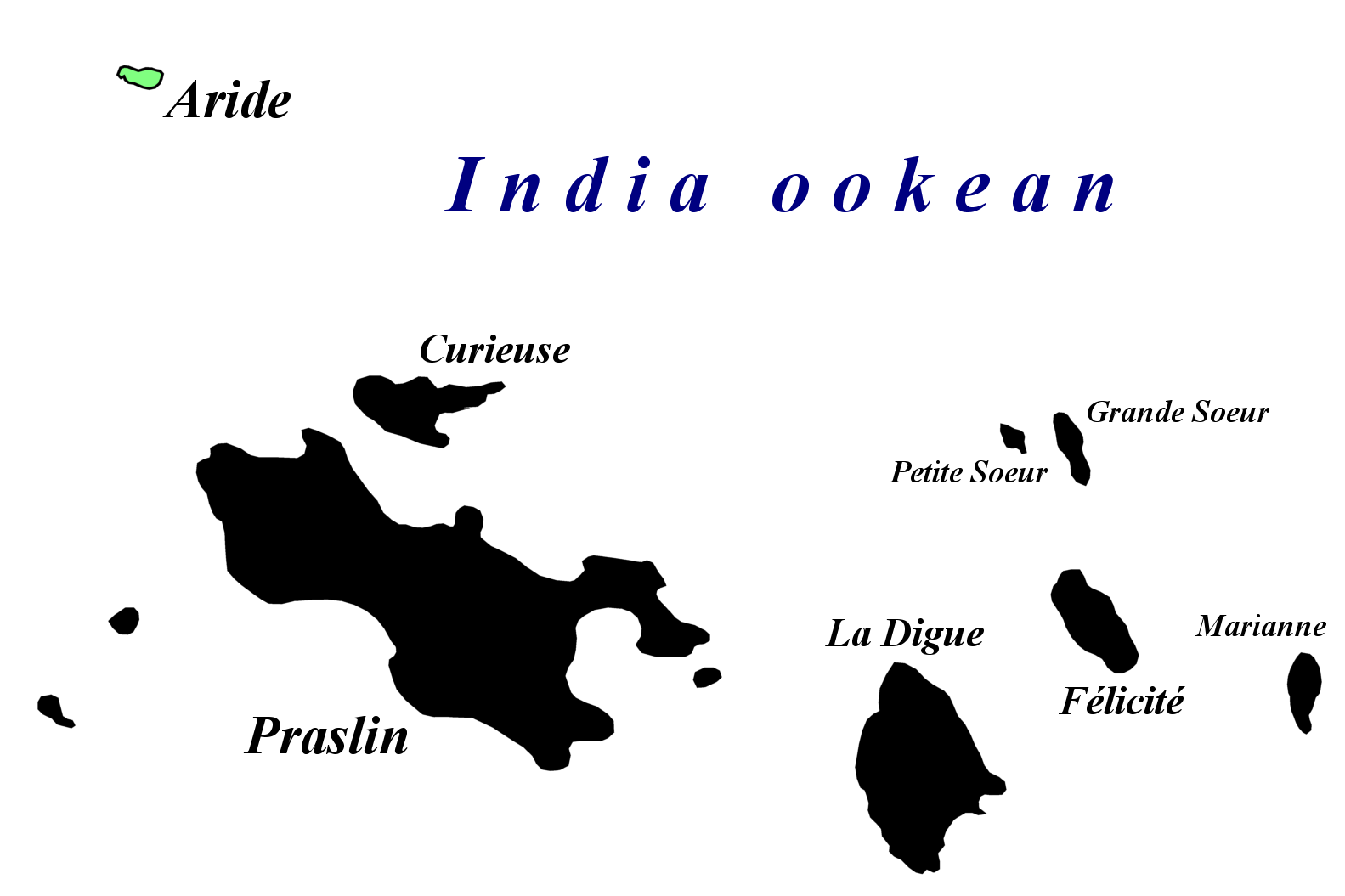
- Aride Island is to the northwest of Praslin island

- Location of Aride Island in Seychelles

Geography
- Location: Seychelles, Indian Ocean
- Coordinates: 4°12′48″S 55°40′48″E
- Archipelago: Inner Islands, Seychelles
- Adjacent to: Indian Ocean
- Total islands: 1
- Major islands: Aride
- Area: 0.71 km^{2} (0.27 sq mi)
- Length: 1.65 km (1.025 mi)
- Width: 0.6 km (0.37 mi)
- Coastline: 4.23 km (2.628 mi)
- Highest elevation: 135 m (443 ft)
- Highest point: Gros la Tête

Administration
- Seychelles
- Group: Inner Islands
- Sub-Group: Granitic Seychelles
- Sub-Group: Praslin Islands
- Districts: Grand'Anse Praslin
- Largest settlement: La Cour (pop. 8)

Demographics
- Population: 8 (2014)
- Pop. density: 11.2/km^{2} (29/sq mi)
- Ethnic groups: Creole, French, East Africans, Indians.

Additional information
- Time zone: SCT (UTC+4)
- ISO code: SC-14
- Official website: www.seychelles.travel/en/discover/the-islands/

Aride Island is the northernmost granitic island in the Seychelles (Bird Island is the northernmost Seychelles island overall). A nature reserve, it is leased and managed by the Island Conservation Society of Seychelles.

== History ==
The name ‘Aride’ first appears on nautical charts after French voyages of exploration in 1770 and 1771. The first written account was in 1787 by Jean-Baptiste Malavois, French commandant of Seychelles, who described it as being “…no more than a pile of rocks covered with a few bushes.” Between 1817 and 1829 Aride was possibly an unofficial leper colony. In 1868, the Irishman Perceval Wright, who gave his name to Aride's unique gardenia and one of its endemic lizards, visited Aride. In 1883, the British artist Marianne North painted a scene on the island, reporting just one large tree, beneath which the island staff sheltered from the sun. Coconut palms were planted over much of Aride and copra production became important economically. Dogs, pigs, cats and chickens were introduced, though fortunately rats never arrived.

The wooden plantation house on Aride, overlooking the small settlement, is one of the last buildings of its type to survive in Seychelles.

For almost a century sooty tern eggs were cropped with up to 220,000 being removed each season. Not surprisingly the number of nesting seabirds declined and all endemic land birds were wiped out. However, in 1967, the island's owner, Paul Chenard, ceased egg collection and declared the island a reserve. In 1973, Mr. Christopher Cadbury purchased Aride for the Society for the Promotion of Nature Reserves (now Royal Society of Wildlife Trusts). In 1979 it was declared a Special Reserve under Seychelles law, to include a marine zone of 200m around the island, with penalties including imprisonment for killing or disturbance of its wildlife.

In 2003, management was transferred to Island Conservation Society. In 2006, the freehold was transferred to the UK Registered Charity Island Conservation Society UK and in 2008, the island was leased back to Island Conservation Society of Seychelles.

== Geography ==
The island is part of the district of Grand'Anse, located 10 km north of Praslin island and is 68 hectares in area.

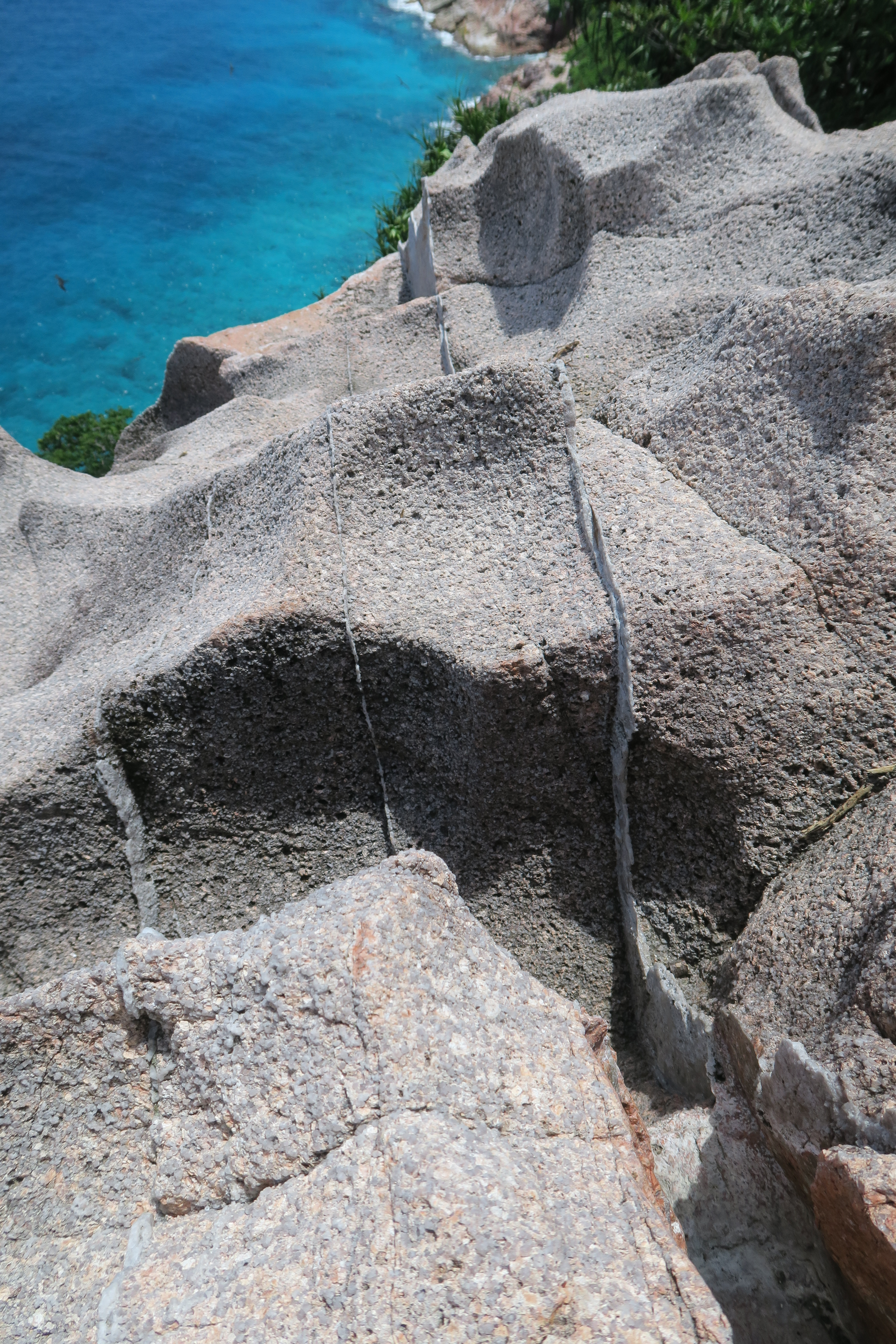
Granite rock in the cliff of Gros la Tête – Aride Island. The thin (1-3 cms. wide) brighter layers are quartz veins, formed during the late stages of crystallization of granitic magmas. They are also sometimes called “hydrothermal veins”

== Demographics ==
The only human inhabitants are the reserve's staff; currently four Seychellois rangers, two expatriate Conservation Officers and two volunteers. They live in the main village of the island, La Cour, on the south side of the island.

== Government services ==
Being an island with a small population, there are not any government buildings or services. For many services, people have to go to Praslin.

== Tourism ==
Today, the island is dedicated to conservation supported by ecotourism. It is known for huge seabird colonies, with more breeding species than any other single Seychelles island plus large numbers of non-breeding frigatebirds. The density of lizards is also one of the greatest on earth. There is only one beach, which faces south, making access difficult when the southeast trade winds are at their height (June to September) There is no overnight accommodation other than for the resident staff of the island but one can visit for the day by boat trip from neighbouring Praslin, 8 kilometres to the south.

== Transport ==
The only form of transportation is by foot.

== Cuisine ==
Fish is the staple diet supplemented by fruit and vegetables grown on the island and other foodstuffs brought by the island boat from Praslin.

== Flora and fauna ==
Over 1.25 million seabirds regularly breed on Aride including the world's largest colony of lesser noddy, the largest Seychelles population of roseate tern, and the world's largest colony of tropical shearwater. There is also an enormous roost of non-breeding frigatebirds.

Five bird species endemic to Seychelles reside on Aride. The Seychelles warbler was introduced from Cousin Island to Aride in 1988 and the island's population of the species is now the largest in the world at over 2,000 pairs. The Seychelles fody was also introduced from Cousin in 2002, and the Seychelles magpie robin was introduced from Fregate Island. The Seychelles blue pigeon and the Seychelles sunbird have re-colonised Aride naturally.

Reptilian fauna includes several species of skinks, three species of geckos, and three species of non-venomous snakes. Green turtles and hawksbill turtles are regular visitors to the beaches of Aride.

Aride is the only place in the world where the flowering shrub Wright's gardenia Rothmannia annae is endemic.

== Image gallery ==
Map of Seychelles

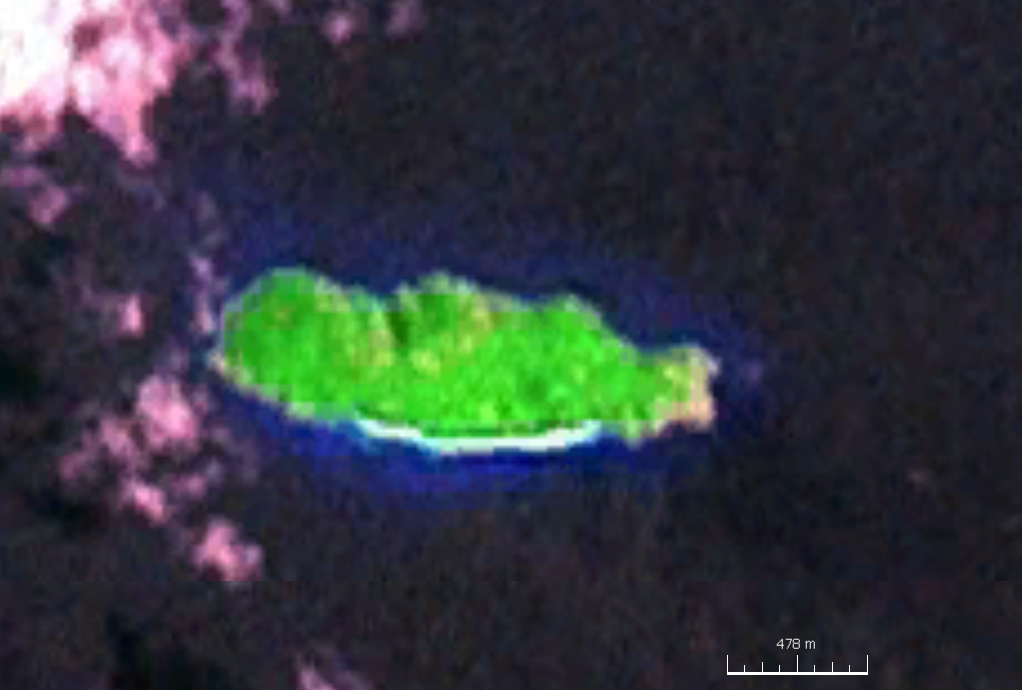
Satellite view

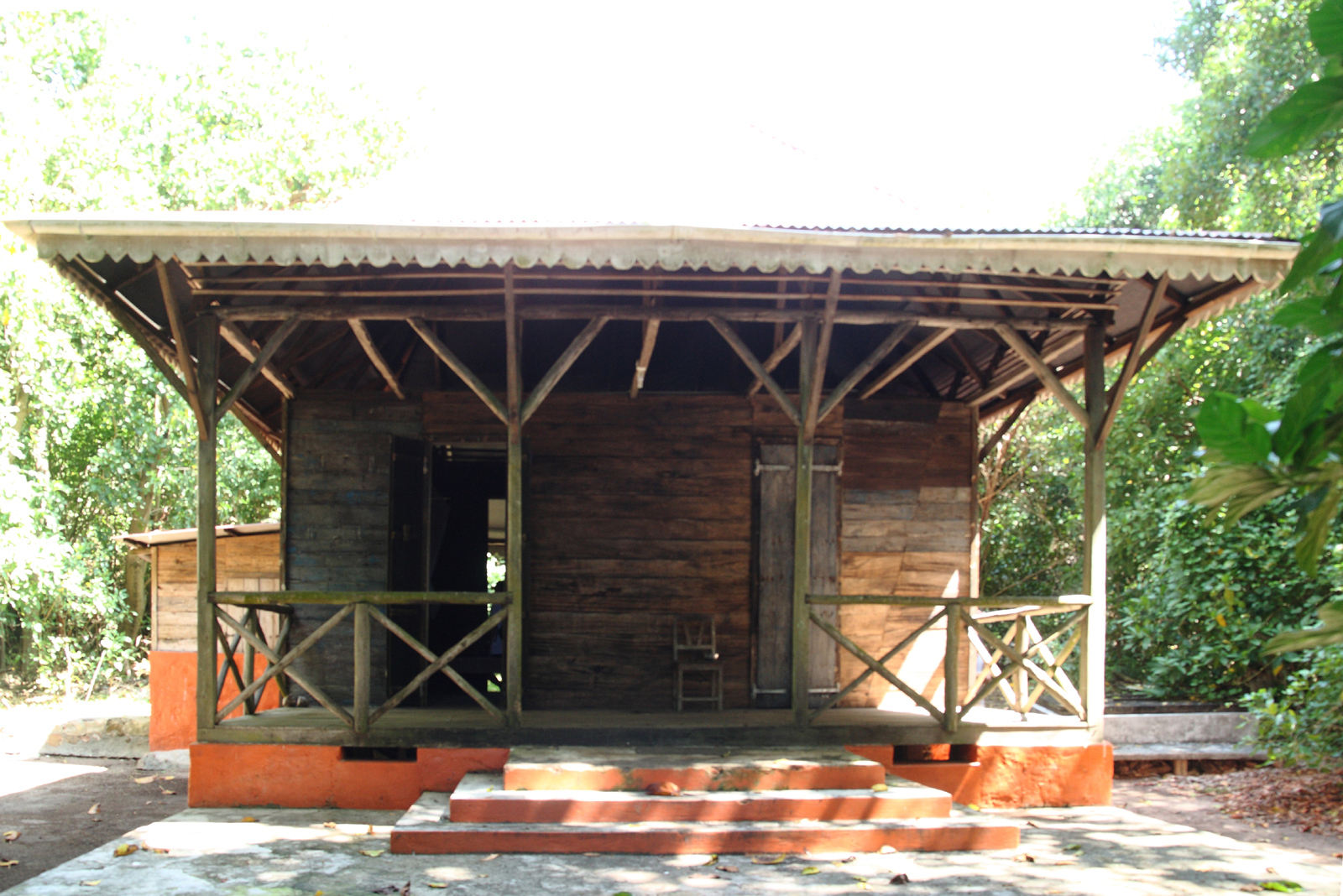
The Lodge, La Cour, Aride

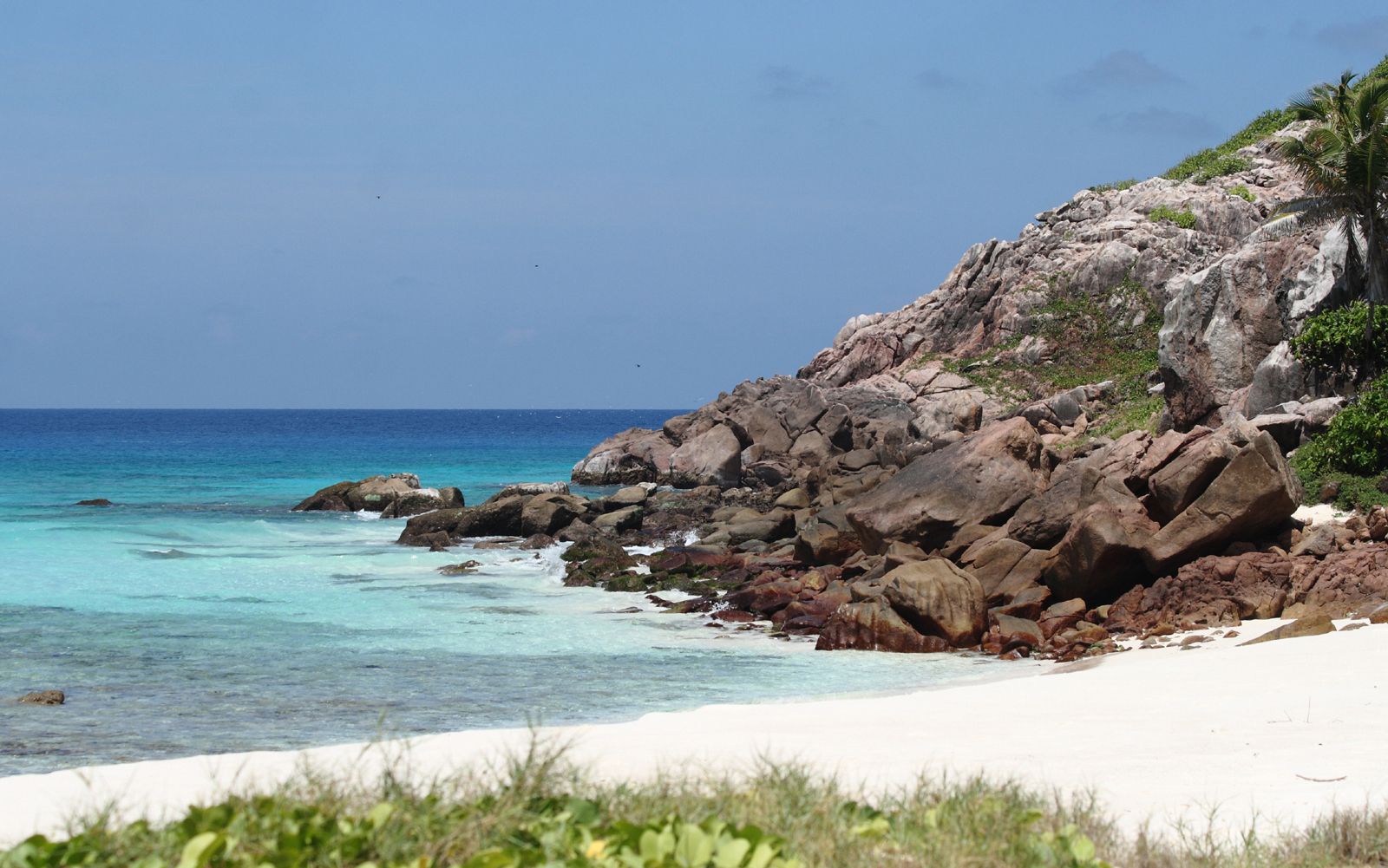
Beach

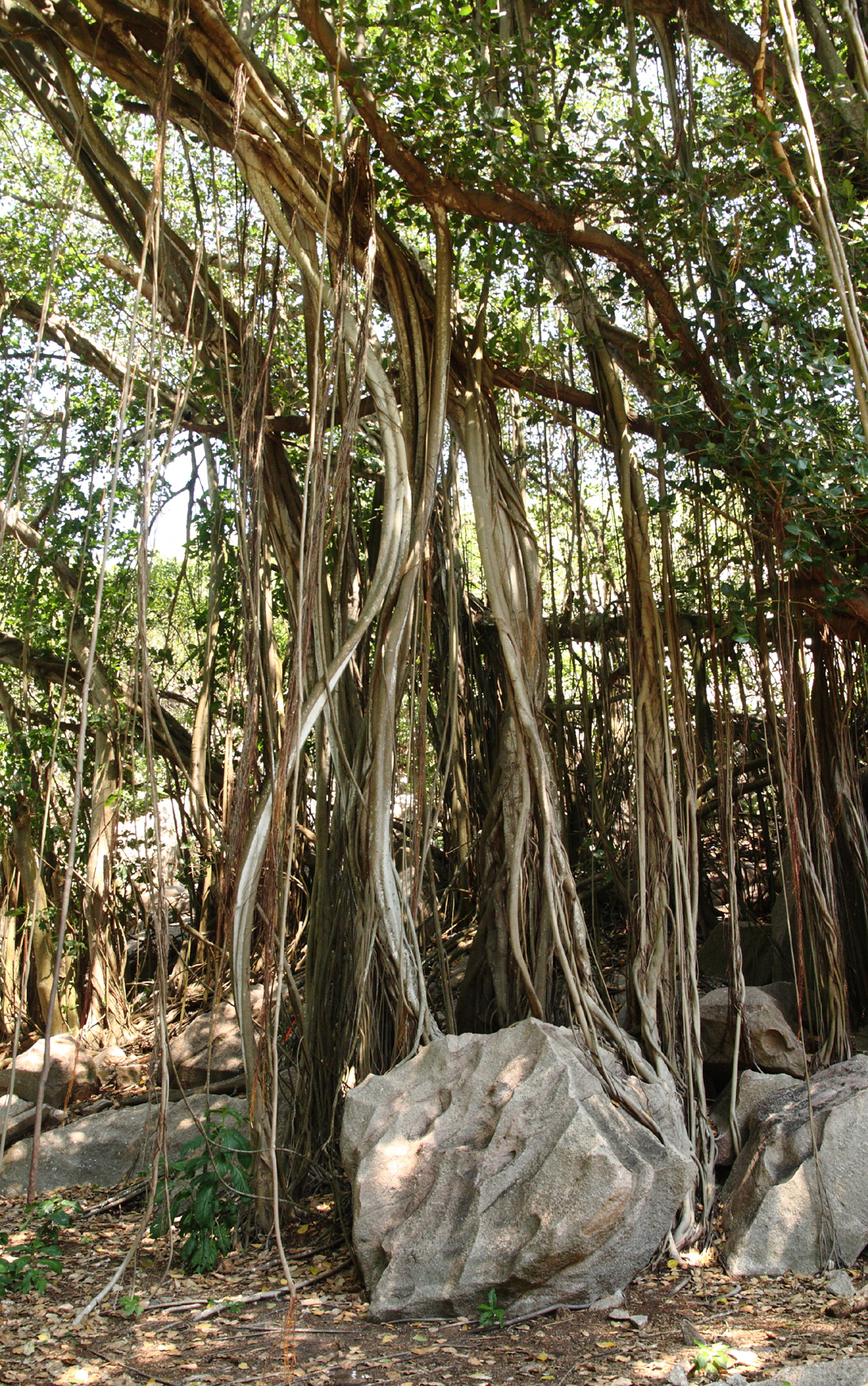
Tree with lianas on Aride

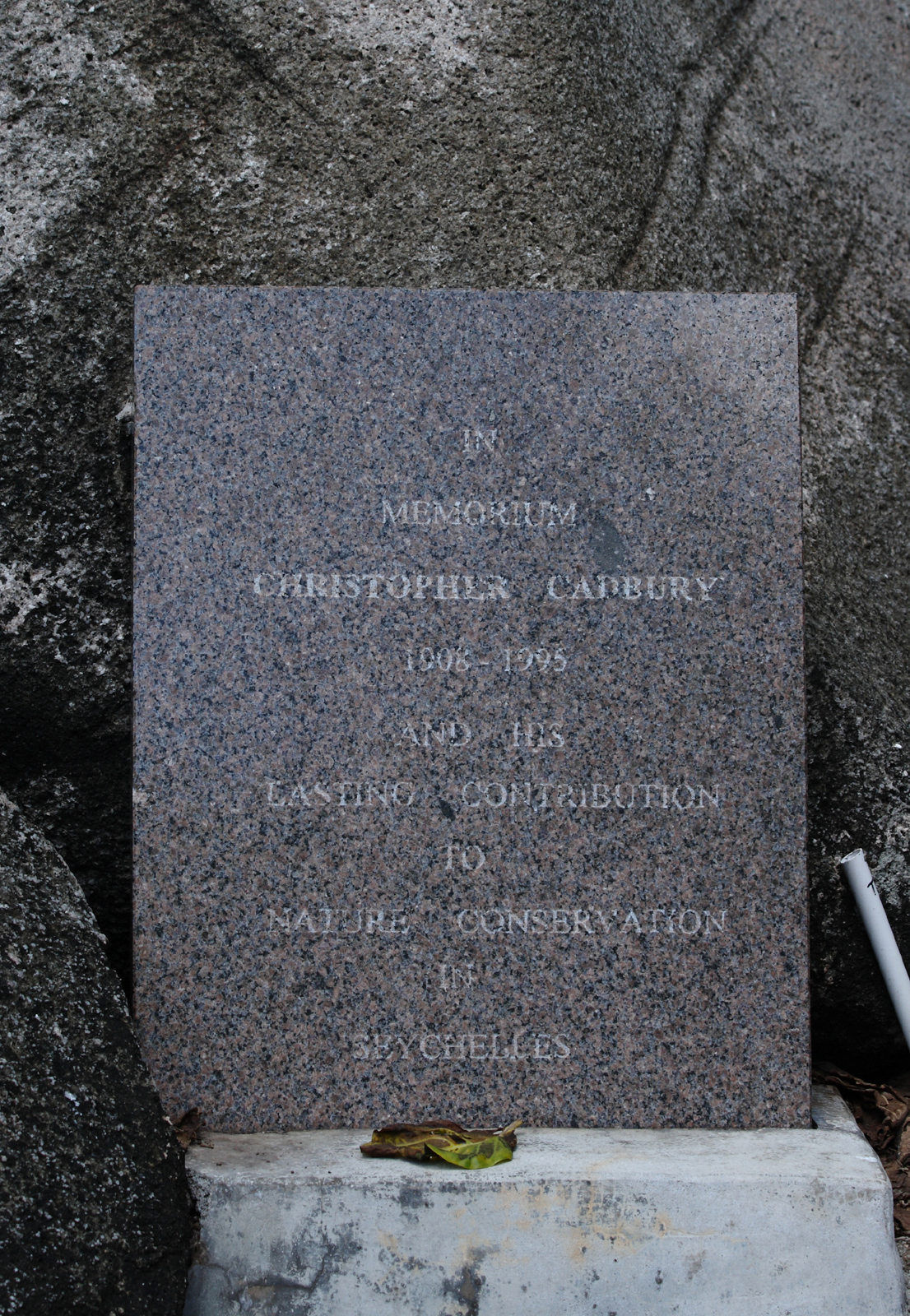
Memorial Plaque of Christopher Cadbury
