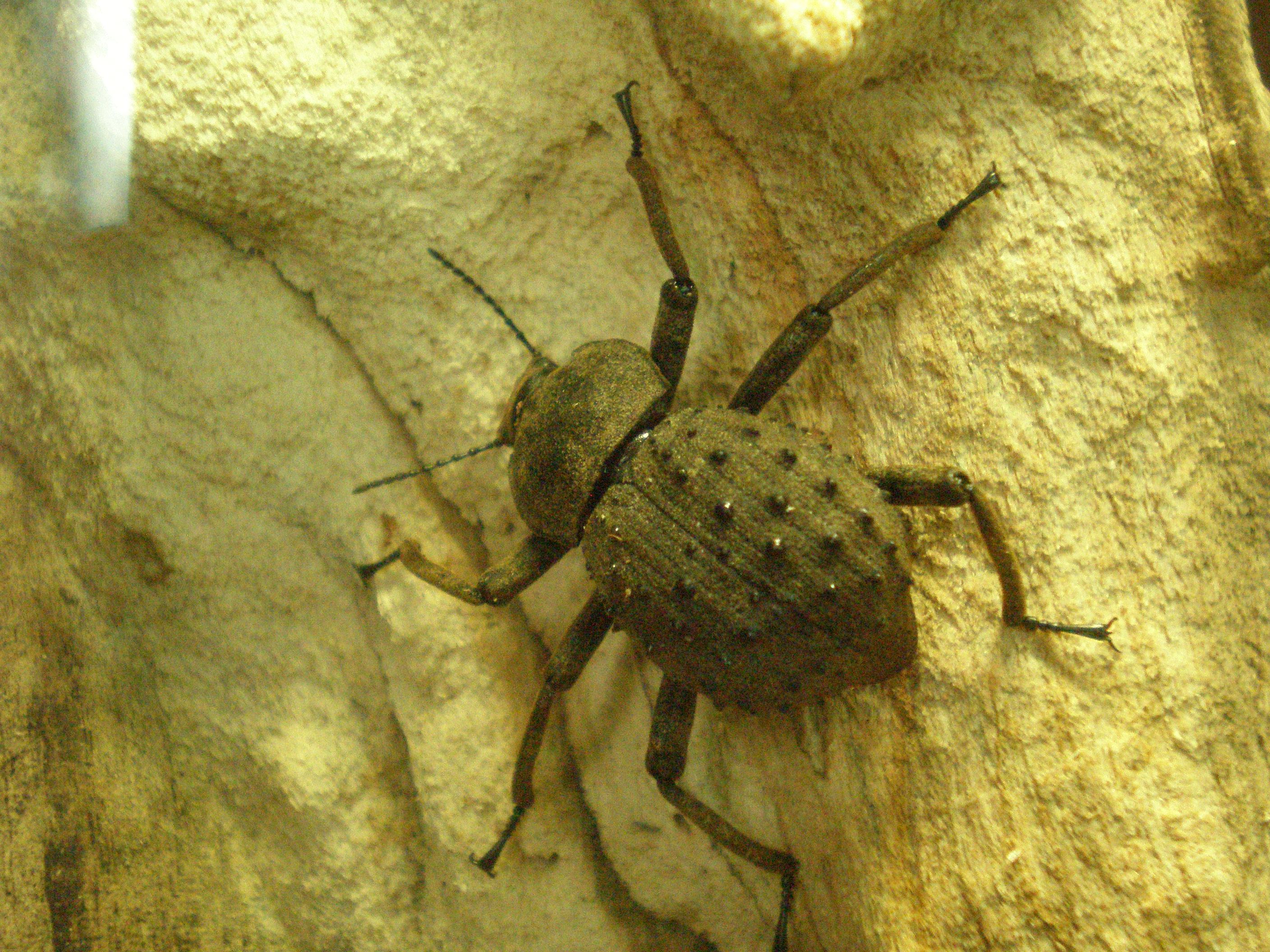

Conservation status
- Vulnerable (IUCN 3.1)

Scientific classification
- Kingdom: Animalia
- Phylum: Arthropoda
- Clade: Pancrustacea
- Class: Insecta
- Order: Coleoptera
- Suborder: Polyphaga
- Infraorder: Cucujiformia
- Family: Tenebrionidae
- Genus: Polposipus; Solier, 1848
- Species: P. herculeanus

Binomial name
- Polposipus herculeanus Solier, 1848

= Polposipus =

Genus of beetle

Polposipus herculeanus, the Frégate Island giant tenebrionid beetle or Frégate beetle, is a flightless species of beetle in family Tenebrionidae. It is the only species in the genus Polposipus. It is endemic to Frégate Island in the Seychelles. It grows to be about 2–3 cm (0.79–1.18 in) long and has a hard, rounded abdomen covered with tubercles. There appears to be no sexual dimorphism. It is largely arboreal, sheltering under the bark of trees, beneath the crooks of branches, and within bushes during the day. It is believed to be nocturnal, descending to the forest floor at night, though never travelling far. This behaviour may help it to avoid predators such as Wright's skink and the Seychelles magpie-robin. When in danger, it will secrete chemicals from defensive glands in the posterior of the beetle, which have a musky smell and stains the skin purple. In captivity, it has been noted to eat a variety of fruits, vegetables, bark, fungus and cat food. There are a few captive populations, taken for conservation reasons, the largest being at London zoo. These populations are the descendants of two small populations taken from the wild several years apart. It is quite possible that it previously lived on other islands in the Seychelles, and it has been suggested that it could be reintroduced to other islands to reduce its vulnerability. In captivity it has been recorded to live for up to seven years.
