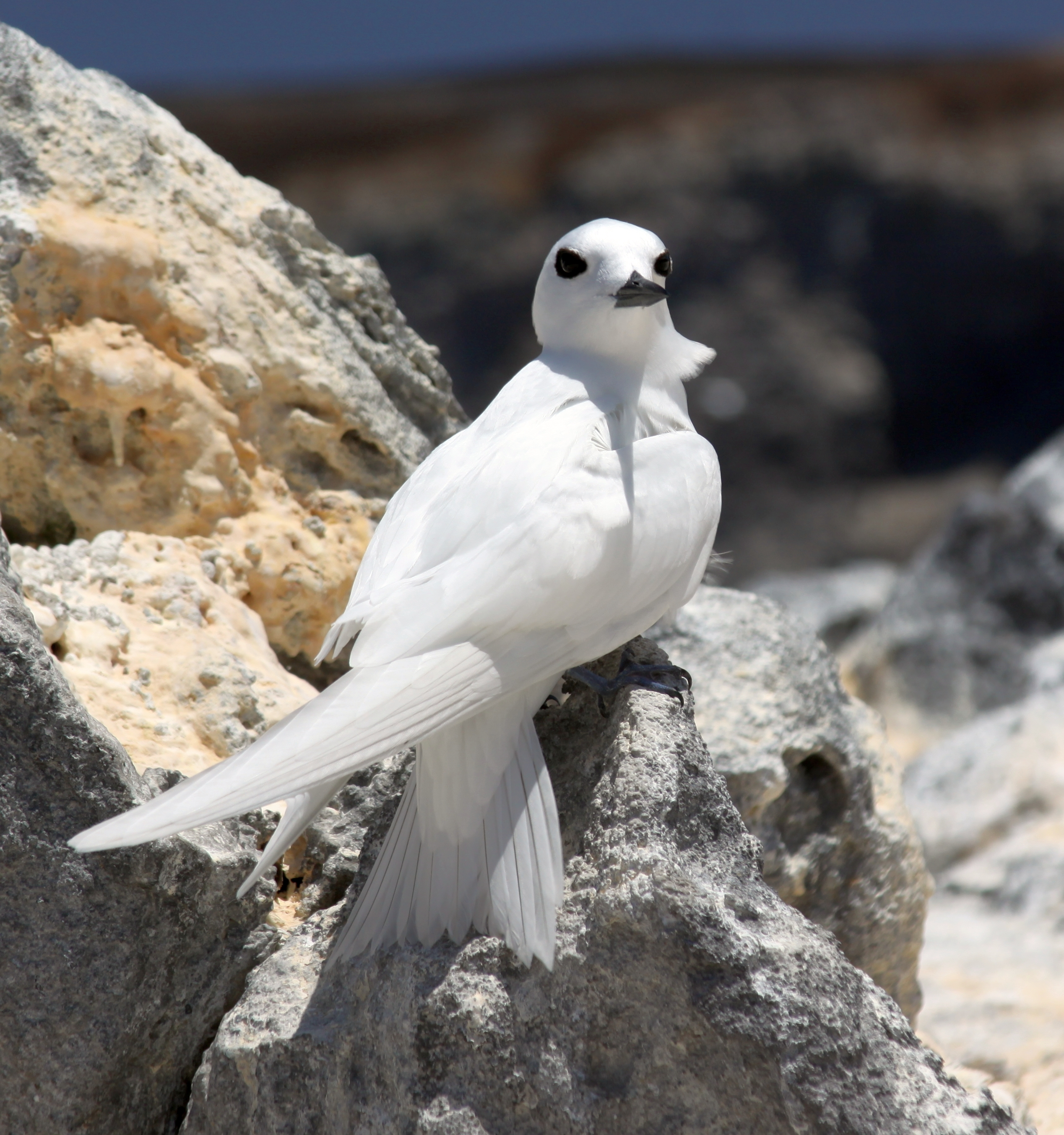
- Gygis alba on Ascension Island

Conservation status
- Least Concern (IUCN 3.1)

Scientific classification
- Kingdom: Animalia
- Phylum: Chordata
- Class: Aves
- Order: Charadriiformes
- Family: Laridae
- Genus: Gygis
- Species: G. alba

Binomial name
- Gygis alba (Sparrman, 1786)

= Atlantic white tern =

Species of bird

The Atlantic white tern (Gygis alba), also known as the common white tern, is a small seabird found in the Atlantic Ocean. It is sometimes known as the fairy tern, although this name is potentially confusing as it is also the common name of Sternula nereis. Other names for the species include angel tern and white noddy. The blue-billed white tern (Gygis candida) and the little white tern (Gygis microrhyncha) have sometimes been considered as subspecies of the Atlantic white tern.

== Taxonomy ==
The Atlantic white tern was first formally described by the Swedish naturalist Anders Sparrman in 1786 under the binomial name Sterna alba. The genus Gygis was introduced by the German zoologist Johann Georg Wagler in 1832. The name Gygis is from the Ancient Greek guges for a mythical bird and the specific alba is Latin for "white". The blue-billed white tern (Gygis candida) and the little white tern (Gygis microrhyncha) were formerly considered to be subspecies of the Atlantic white tern.

Molecular phylogenetic studies have shown that the white terns are more closely related to the noddies (Anous) than they are to the other terns. This implies that "white noddy" would be a more appropriate English name; this has been taken up by at least one major text.

== Description ==
The Atlantic white tern is 23–30 cm (9.1–11.8 in) long with a wingspan of 76–87 cm (30–34 in). It has pure white plumage, except for a dark streak along the shafts of the outer primary feathers in G. a. candida), a black eye accentuated by a narrow ring of black feathers round the eye, and a long black to bluish-black bill. The tail is shallowly forked, but like in the noddies, with the longest feathers the second-from outermost, not the outermost as in other terns. The legs are dark grey, to paler grey in G. a. leucopes and G. a. microrhyncha. The juvenile is white mottled with grey or greyish-brown. Nesting on coral islands, usually on trees with small branches but also on rocky ledges and on man-made structures, the white tern feeds on small fish which it catches by plunge diving.

== Distribution and habitat ==
The Atlantic white tern is found on certain remote islands in the South Atlantic. It is a pelagic and epipelagic bird, living along the coast and moving into wooded areas during the breeding season.

== Behaviour ==
This species is notable for laying its egg on bare thin branches in a small fork or depression without a nest. This behaviour is unusual for terns, which generally nest on the ground, and even the related tree-nesting black noddy constructs a nest. It is thought that the reason for the absence of nests is the reduction in nest parasites, which in some colonial seabirds can cause the abandonment of an entire colony. In spite of these benefits there are costs associated with tree nesting, as the eggs and chicks are vulnerable to becoming dislodged by heavy winds. For this reason the white tern is also quick to lay a replacement should it lose the egg. The newly hatched chicks have well-developed feet with which to hang on to their precarious nesting site. It is a long-lived bird, having been recorded living for 42 years.

== Relationship with humans ==
New Zealand's Department of Conservation classifies the white tern as Nationally Critical, with populations having been largely decimated by the introduction of feral cats and rats on Raoul Island, the terns' only breeding site in the country. As of 2016, the white tern population in New Zealand was reported to be increasing following the eradication of introduced predators in 2002. Globally, the white tern has a large range that is home to several large colonies, and both recognised species are listed as Least Concern by the IUCN Red List.
