= Booby Island (Seychelles) =

Nickname: Ile Aux Fous
- Location within Seychelles

Geography
- Location: Seychelles, Indian Ocean
- Coordinates: 4.26°S 55.673°E
- Archipelago: Inner Islands, Seychelles
- Adjacent to: Indian Ocean
- Total islands: 1
- Major islands: Booby
- Area: 0.023 km^{2} (0.0089 sq mi)
- Length: 0.17 km (0.106 mi)
- Width: 0.16 km (0.099 mi)
- Coastline: 0.6 km (0.37 mi)
- Highest elevation: 30 m (100 ft)

Administration
- Seychelles
- Group: Inner Islands
- Sub-Group: Granitic Seychelles
- Sub-Group: Praslin Islands
- Districts: Grand'Anse Praslin

Demographics
- Population: 0 (2014)
- Pop. density: 0/km^{2} (0/sq mi)
- Ethnic groups: Creole, French, East Africans, Indians.

Additional information
- Time zone: SCT (UTC+4)
- ISO code: SC-14
- Official website: www.seychelles.travel/en/discover/the-islands/

Booby is an island in Seychelles, lying north of Praslin and south of Aride Island. It has an area of 2.3& hectares.

Booby Island is a high granite rock, densely covered with tropical vegetation. The name of the island was given through numerous flocks of boobies that nest on the island. The island is uninhabited.

== Tourism ==
The island is visited by tourists for its wide variety of underwater creatures like fish, sharks and rays.
