= Cousine Island =

Island in Seychelles

- Location within Seychelles

Geography
- Location: Seychelles, Indian Ocean
- Coordinates: 4°21′48″S 55°38′48″E
- Archipelago: Inner Islands, Seychelles
- Adjacent to: Indian Ocean
- Total islands: 1
- Major islands: Cousine
- Area: 0.3 km^{2} (0.12 sq mi)
- Length: 0.9 km (0.56 mi)
- Width: 0.4 km (0.25 mi)
- Coastline: 2.7 km (1.68 mi)
- Highest elevation: 76 m (249 ft)

Administration
- Seychelles
- Group: Inner Islands
- Sub-Group: Granitic Seychelles
- Sub-Group: Praslin Islands
- Districts: Grand'Anse Praslin
- Largest settlement: Cousine East (pop. 16)

Demographics
- Population: 16 (2014)
- Ethnic groups: Creole, French, East Africans, Indians.

Additional information
- Time zone: SCT (UTC+4)
- ISO code: SC-14
- Official website: www.seychelles.travel/en/discover/the-islands/

Cousine Island is a small granitic island 30 ha (74 acres) in the Seychelles 6 km (4 mi) west of Praslin Island. It is a combination luxury resort and since 1992 a nature preserve.

== History ==
In 1992 the island was purchased and a conservation program was introduced to protect nesting sea turtles and maintain the existing populations of endemic land birds.

== Flora & Fauna ==
Cousine Island is a breeding ground for seabirds and has a population of transplanted Aldabra giant tortoises. The island has undergone an extensive vegetation rehabilitation program which involves planting of indigenous flora and the removal of alien plant species. Since 1995 over 2000 native trees have been planted.

Indo-Pacific hawksbill turtles are known to nest on this island.

=== Important Bird Area ===
The island has been identified by BirdLife International as an Important Bird Area because it supports populations of the Seychelles warbler, magpie-robin and fody, as well as substantial breeding colonies of wedge-tailed shearwaters, white-tailed tropicbirds, lesser noddies and white terns.

== Tourism ==
In order to finance the restoration project a small exclusive bungalow resort was built on Cousine. The hotel manager, his family, and an ornithologist with his family, live in the staff quarters on the east beach. They are responsible for the restoration, maintenance and preservation of flora and fauna of the island. The current staff is 16 employees.

There are four beachfront French Colonial style villas (maximum number of guests allowed is 10) on the island. It is 30 hectares. As of 2012, it is the world's third most expensive private island.

== Image gallery ==
Map 1

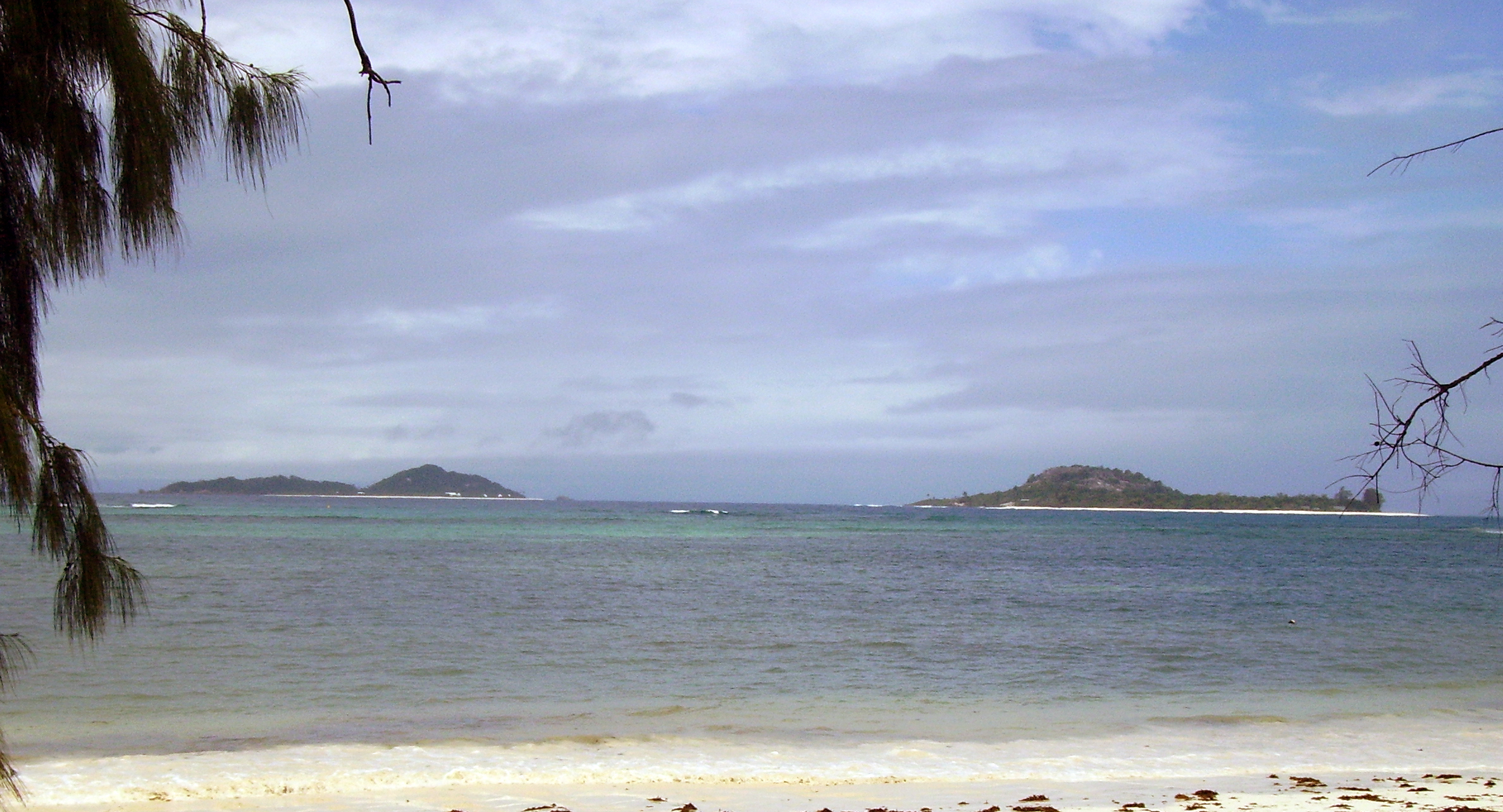
Cousine and Cousin (right), seen from Praslin

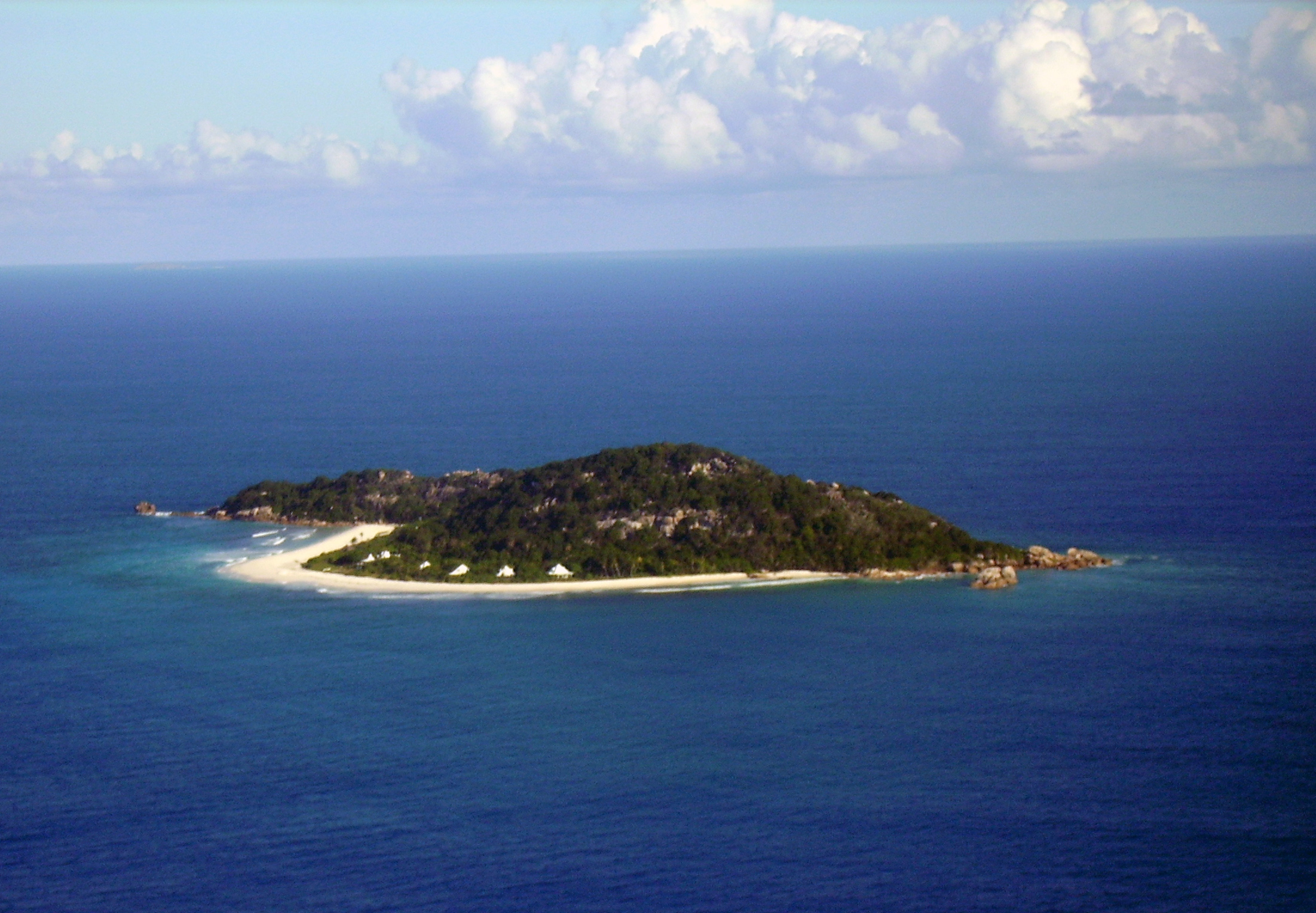
Cousine Island

Map 2
