= Grand'Anse Praslin =

Coordinates: 4°19′52″S 55°43′20″E

- District

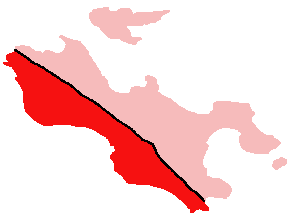
- Location within Praslin Island, Seychelles
- Country: Seychelles

Government
  - District Administrator: Moses Barbe
  - Member of National Assembly: Hon. Wavel Woodcock (LDS)

Population (2019 Estimate)
  - Total: 3,876
- Time zone: Seychelles Time

Grand'Anse Praslin is an administrative district of Seychelles located mostly on the island of Praslin, but also administers Cousin Island, Cousine Island, Booby Island, and Aride Island.
