= Frégate Island Airport =

- IATA: FRK; ICAO: FSSF

Summary
- Airport type: Private
- Operator: Frégate Island Resort
- Location: Frégate Island, Seychelles
- Elevation AMSL: 10 ft / 3 m
- Coordinates: 04°35′00″S 55°56′44″E

Map
- Location within Seychelles

Runways
Direction	Length		Surface
Direction	m	ft	Surface
13/31	500	1,640	Grass
- Sources: GCM Google Maps

Frégate Island Airport (IATA: FRK, ICAO: FSSF) is an airstrip serving Frégate Island in the Seychelles. The runway is along the northeast shore of the island.

Frégate Island is 55 kilometres (34 mi) east of Victoria, capital of the Seychelles.

== See also ==
- Transport in Seychelles
- List of airports in Seychelles
