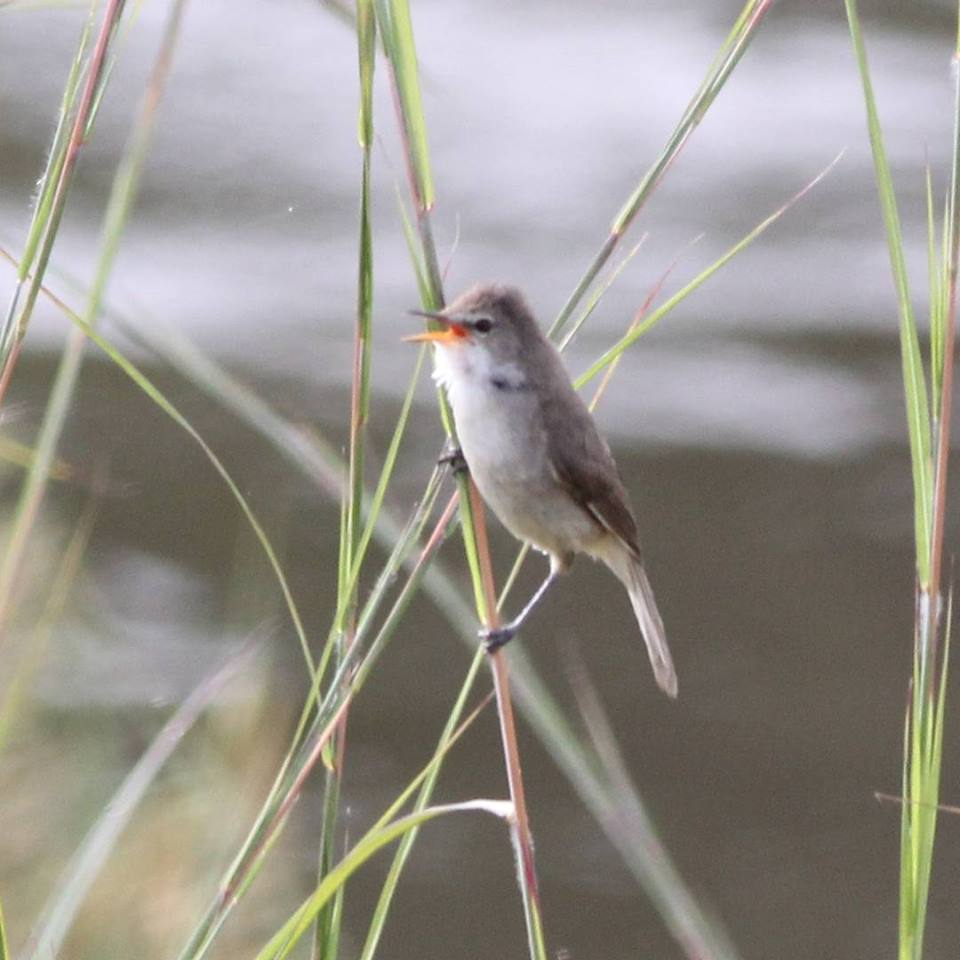
- A. r. ansorgei at Menongue, Angola

Conservation status
- Least Concern (IUCN 3.1)

Scientific classification
- Kingdom: Animalia
- Phylum: Chordata
- Class: Aves
- Order: Passeriformes
- Family: Acrocephalidae
- Genus: Acrocephalus
- Species: A. rufescens

Binomial name
- Acrocephalus rufescens (Sharpe & Bouvier, 1877)

Subspecies
- A. r. senegalensis - Colston & Morel, 1985; A. r. rufescens - (Sharpe & Bouvier, 1877); A. r. chadensis - (Alexander, 1907); A. r. ansorgei - (Hartert, 1906)
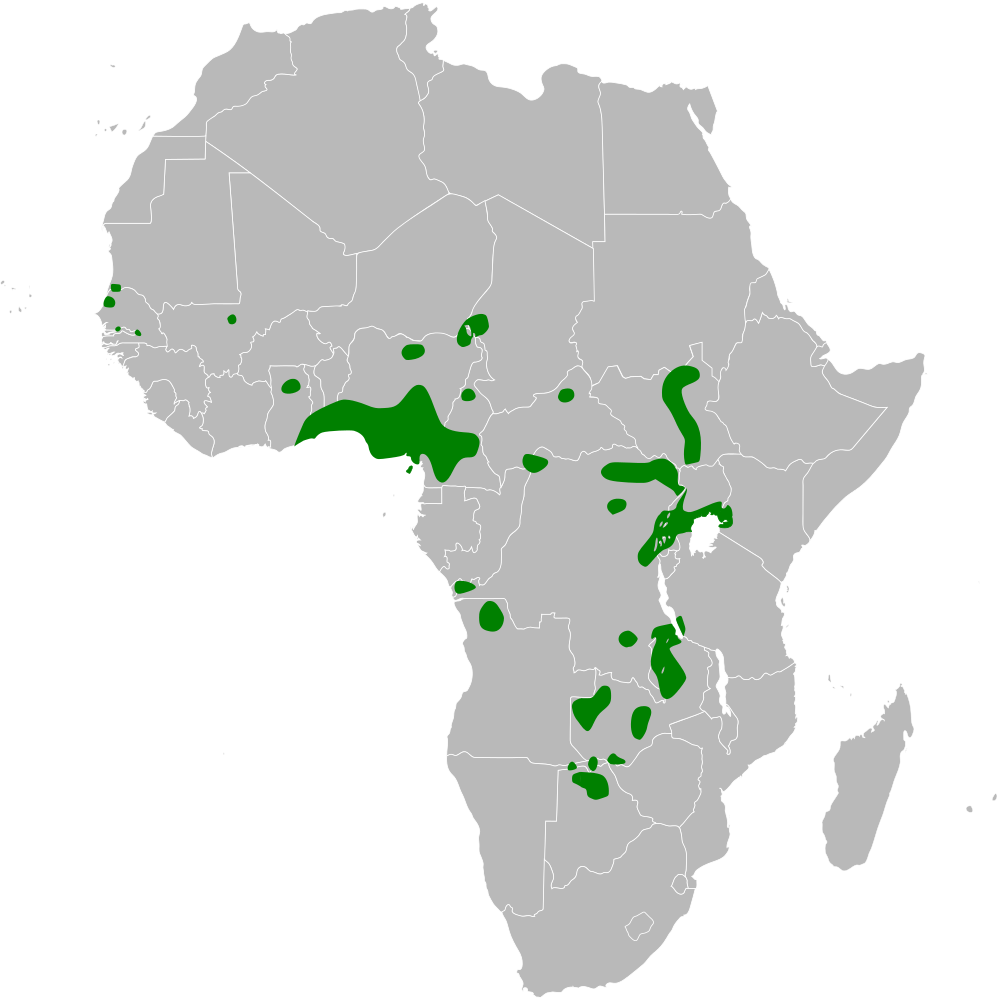

= Greater swamp warbler =

Species of bird

The greater swamp warbler (Acrocephalus rufescens) is a species of Old World warbler in the family Acrocephalidae. It is found in the African countries of Angola, Botswana, Burundi, Cameroon, Central African Republic, Chad, Republic of the Congo, Democratic Republic of the Congo, Equatorial Guinea, Gabon, Ghana, Kenya, Mali, Mauritania, Namibia, Nigeria, Rwanda, Senegal, South Sudan, Tanzania, Togo, Uganda, Zambia, and Zimbabwe. Its natural habitat is swamps.
