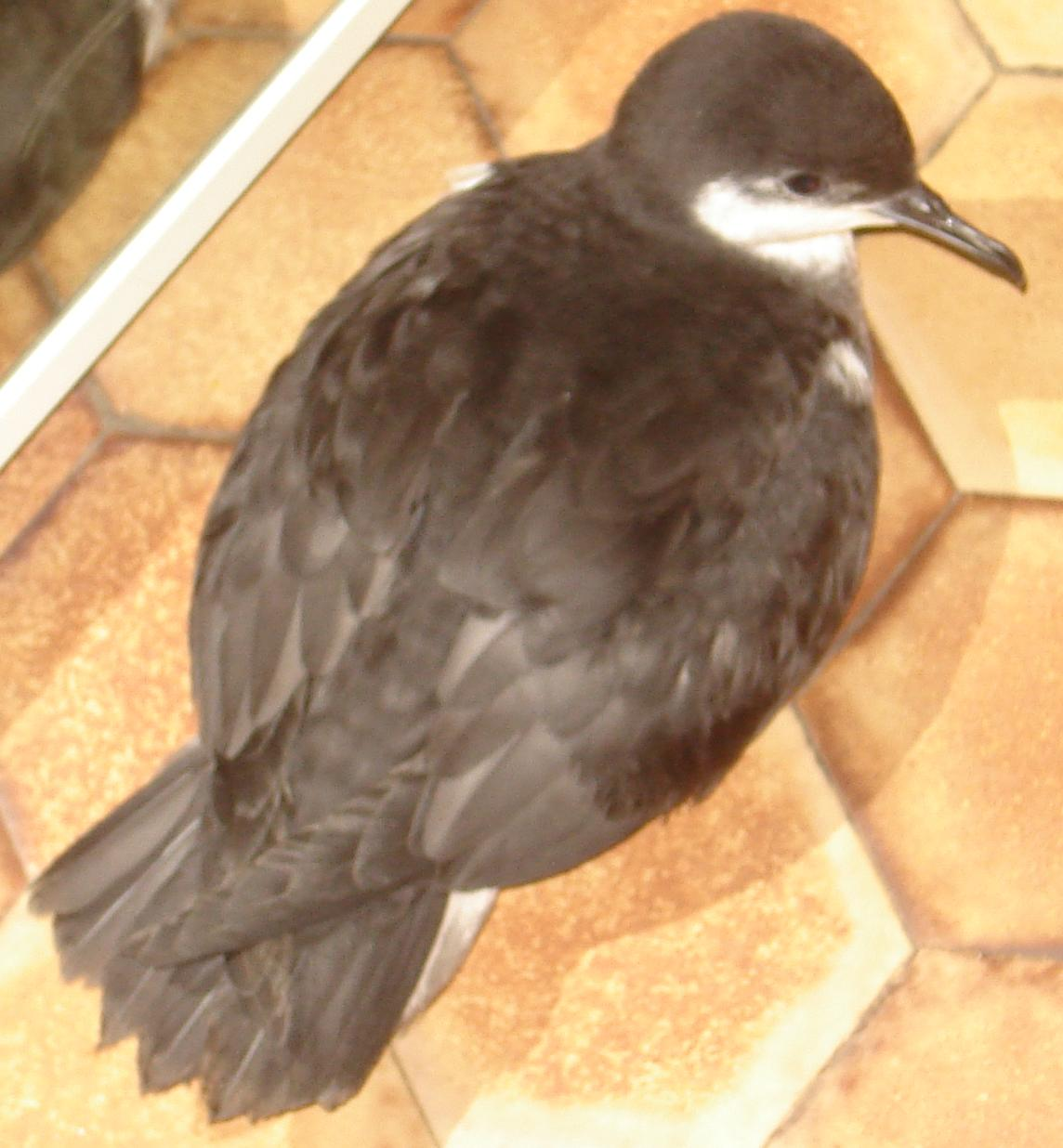
- in Réunion

Conservation status
- Least Concern (IUCN 3.1)

Scientific classification
- Kingdom: Animalia
- Phylum: Chordata
- Class: Aves
- Order: Procellariiformes
- Family: Procellariidae
- Genus: Puffinus
- Species: P. bailloni

Binomial name
- Puffinus bailloni (Bonaparte, 1857)

Subspecies
- 5, see text

= Tropical shearwater =

Species of bird

The tropical shearwater (Puffinus bailloni) is a seabird in the family Procellariidae formerly considered conspecific with Audubon's shearwater (Puffinus lherminieri).

== Subspecies ==
There are five listed subspecies of the tropical shearwater:

- Puffinus bailloni nicolae – (Jouanin, 1971): breeds on islands in the northwest Indian Ocean.
- Puffinus bailloni colstoni – (Shirihai & Christie, 1996): breeds in the Aldabra Islands in the Seychelles.
- Puffinus bailloni bailloni – (Bonaparte, 1857): Mauritius, Réunion & Europa Island.
- Puffinus bailloni dichrous – (Finsch & Hartlaub, 1867): Central Pacific islands.
- Puffinus bailloni gunax – (Mathews, 1930): Vanuatu.

== Range ==
The tropical shearwater is found in the tropical parts of the western Indian Ocean from East Africa to southern India and in similar regions of the Pacific from just to the southeast of Japan to French Polynesia.

== Population ==
The total population has not been definitively quantified. Aride Island in Seychelles has the world's largest population on a single island with an estimated 26,118 pairs. Smaller numbers of the subspecies P. b. bailloni breed on the nearby islands of Cousin, Cousine, Recif, and a few other small rat-free islands. Subspecies P. b. dichrous is estimated to number 1,000–10,000 pairs on the Line Islands and 10,000–100,000 pairs on the Phoenix Islands, with the nominate subspecies thought to number 3,000–5,000 pairs on Réunion and fewer than 100 individuals on Europa (reviewed by Brooke 2004), though it is thought there are many more breeding colonies on other islands in the Pacific. The population seems to be stable.
