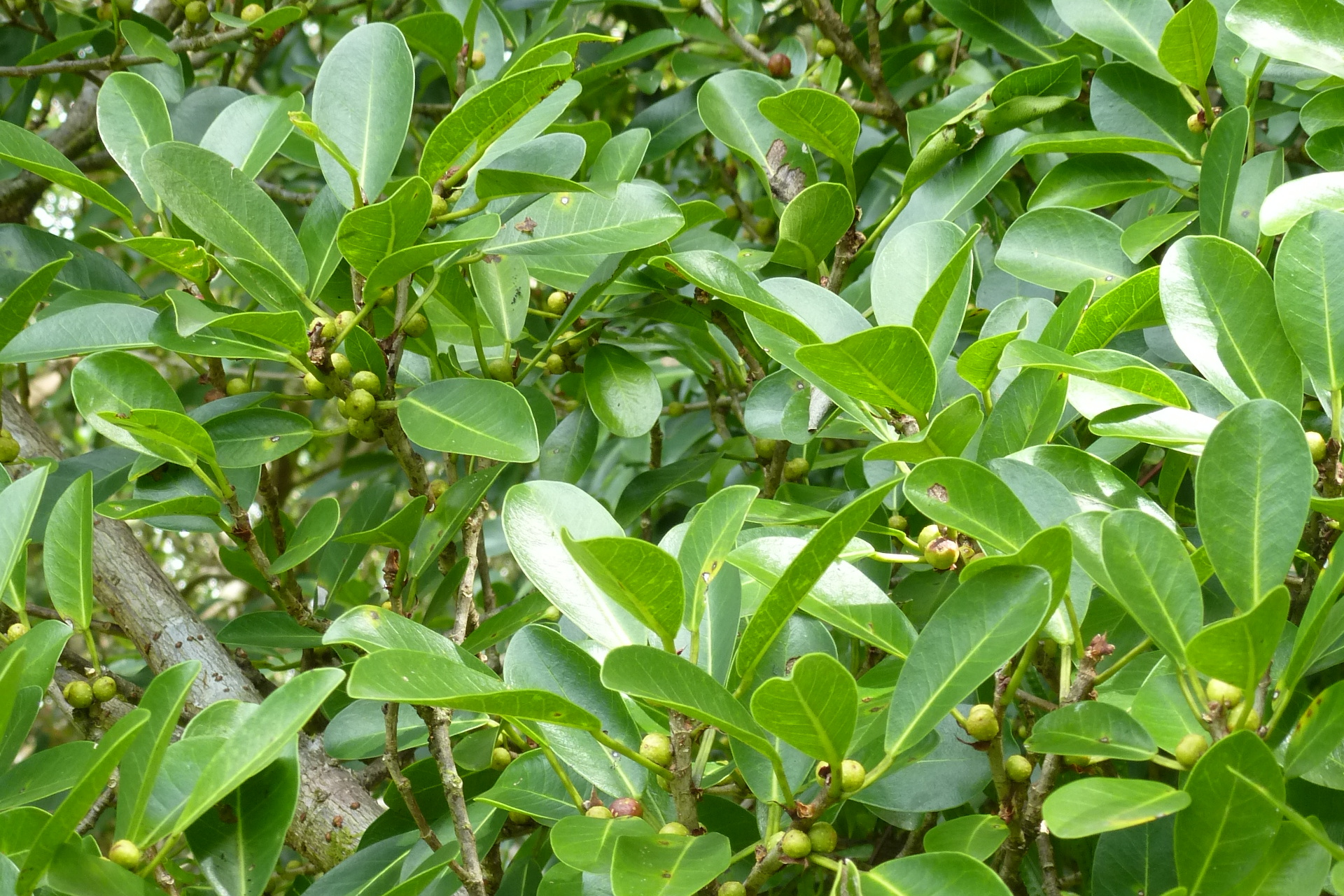
- '

Conservation status
- Least Concern (IUCN 3.1)

Scientific classification
- Kingdom: Plantae
- Clade: Tracheophytes
- Clade: Angiosperms
- Clade: Eudicots
- Clade: Rosids
- Order: Rosales
- Family: Moraceae
- Genus: Ficus
- Species: F. reflexa

Binomial name
- Ficus reflexa Thunb. (1786)

Synonyms
- Urostigma reflexum (Thunb.) Miq.; synonyms of subsp. aldabrensis: Ficus aldabrensis Baker; synonyms of subsp. reflexa: Ficus aggregata Vahl; Ficus ciliolosa Miq., nom. illeg. homonym. post.; Ficus melleri Baker; Ficus punctata Lam., nom. illeg. homonym. post.; Ficus pyrifolia var. imerinensis H.Perrier; Ficus pyrifolia var. melleri (Baker) H.Perrier; Ficus pyrifolia var. occidentalis H.Perrier; Ficus pyrifolia var. tsaratananensis H.Perrier; Ficus terebrata Willd.; Urostigma aggregatum (Vahl) Miq.; Urostigma terebratum (Willd.) Miq.; synonyms of subsp. sechellensis: Ficus rubra var. sechellensis Baker; Ficus sechellarum Summerh.

= Ficus reflexa =

Species of flowering plant

Ficus reflexa is a species of flowering plant in the family of Moraceae. It is a shrub or tree native to Madagascar and other islands in the western Indian Ocean.

It is found in Madagascar, Comoros, Réunion, Mauritius, and Seychelles. It grows in lowland and montane dry and moist tropical forests.

Three subspecies are accepted.

- Ficus reflexa subsp. aldabrensis (Baker) C.C.Berg – Aldabra and Comoros
- Ficus reflexa subsp. reflexa – Madagascar, Mauritius, Rodrigues, and Réunion
- Ficus reflexa subsp. sechellensis (Baker) C.C.Berg – Granitic Seychelles
