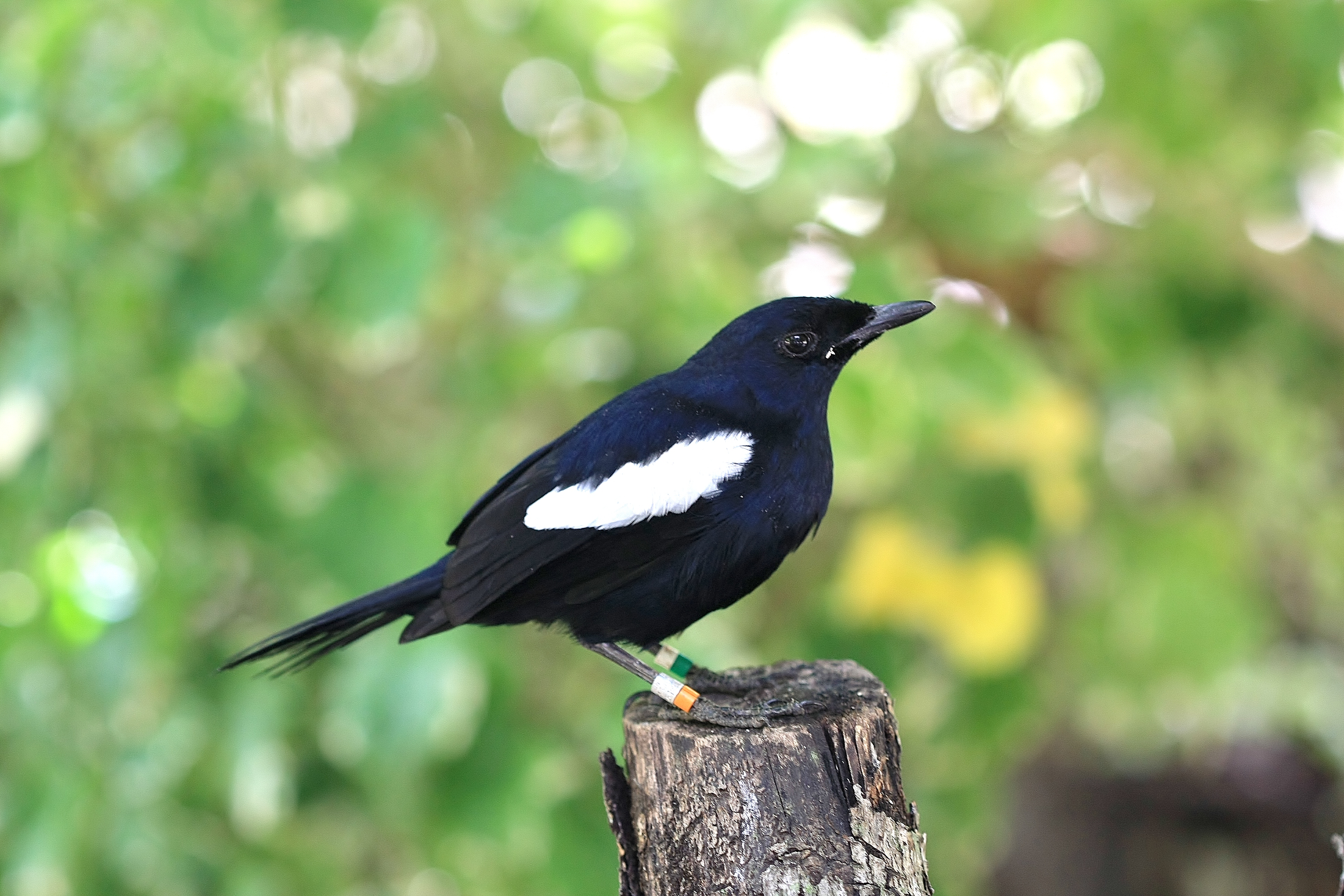
- On the Seychelles

Conservation status
- Endangered (IUCN 3.1)

Scientific classification
- Kingdom: Animalia
- Phylum: Chordata
- Class: Aves
- Order: Passeriformes
- Family: Muscicapidae
- Genus: Copsychus
- Species: C. sechellarum

Binomial name
- Copsychus sechellarum Newton, 1865

= Seychelles magpie-robin =

Species of bird

The Seychelles magpie-robin (Copsychus sechellarum) is a medium-sized endangered bird from the granitic Seychelles in the Indian Ocean.

This species of magpie-robin is approximately 25 cm (9.8 in) in length. With a body mass of 65 g (2.3 oz) in females and 76 g (2.7 oz) in males, this species may stand as the largest remnant species in the diverse Muscicapidae with the separation of larger birds such as cochoas to the thrush family. It has a glossy coal-black plumage with a white-colored bar on each wing. It is considered a long-lived species, whose lifespan is over 15 years of age. Its habitat is woodlands, plantations and the vicinity of gardens. Their range on the island of Fregate was limited by the area of open ground with leaf litter.

Historically, it is believed to have existed on most of the granitic Seychelles islands. Destruction of habitat and introduced predators (domestic cats and dogs brought in to manage the numbers of rats and mice) greatly reduced its numbers. By 1970, it was on the brink of extinction, with only 16 individuals remaining, all on Frégate Island. Over the next two decades it had managed to stave off extinction, but its population in 1990 was still only 21 individuals. In 1990, BirdLife International began preservation efforts to save the Seychelles magpie-robin. Birds were transferred to Cousin in 1994 and to Cousine in 1995. Further transfers followed to Aride Island in 2002 and Denis Island in 2008.

Today, there are established populations of Seychelles magpie-robins on all five islands. As of 2012, the total population was 244–248 birds (Frégate- 115), (Cousin- 38), (Cousine- 31), (Aride- 24), (Denis- 36-40) and the IUCN has downlisted its status from Critically Endangered to Endangered. However, a recent genetic study reported extremely low genetic diversity across the islands, calling for continued genetic monitoring of the populations.

It is printed over the latest 25 Seychelles rupee bank notes, a 2016 series of bank notes all about local birds.
