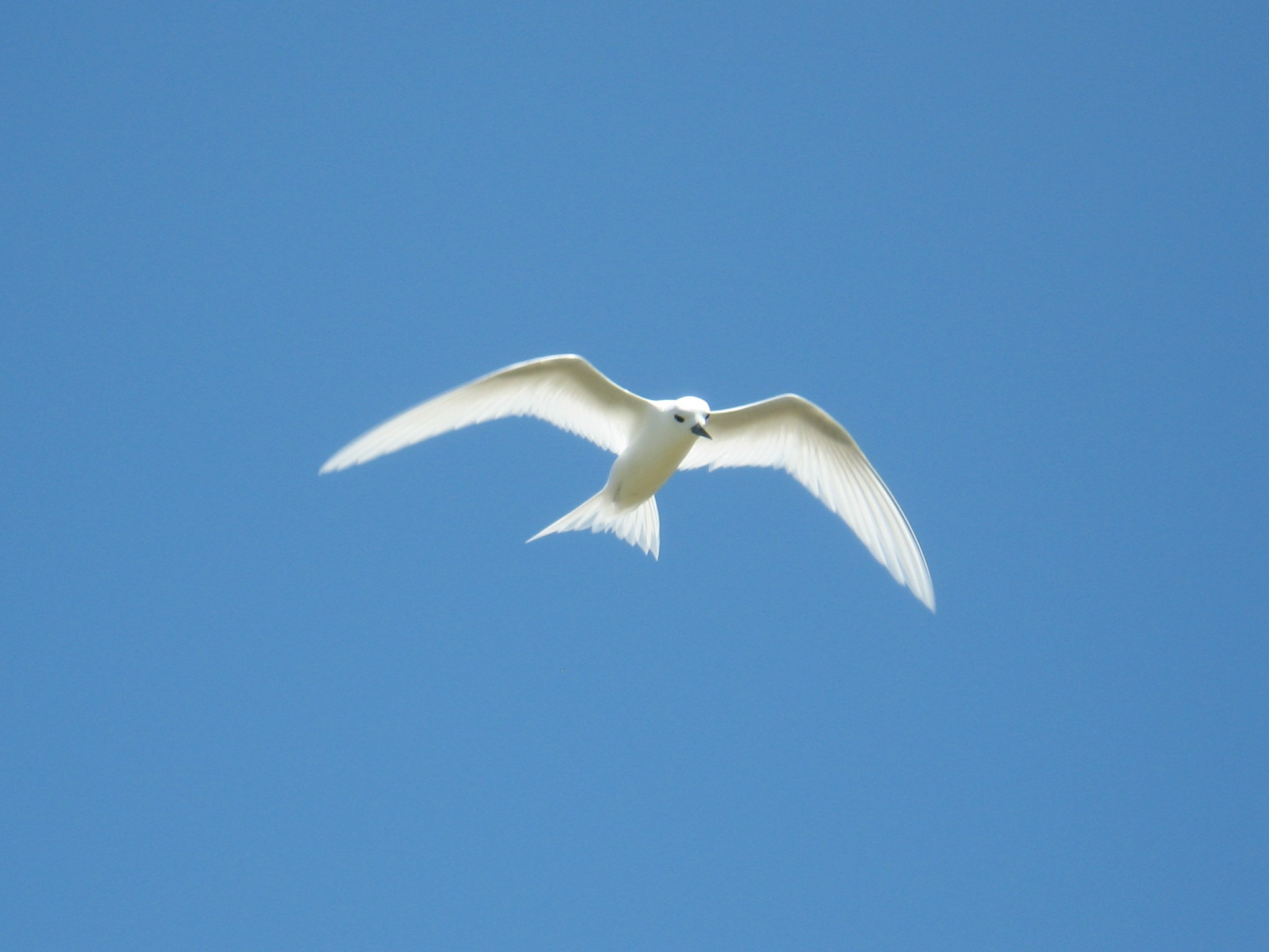

Conservation status
- Least Concern (IUCN 3.1)

Scientific classification
- Kingdom: Animalia
- Phylum: Chordata
- Class: Aves
- Order: Charadriiformes
- Family: Laridae
- Genus: Gygis
- Species: G. microrhyncha

Binomial name
- Gygis microrhyncha Saunders, 1876

= Little white tern =

Species of seabird

The little white tern (Gygis microrhyncha) is a small seabird found in French Polynesia and the Republic of Kiribati. This species was previously considered a subspecies of the white tern (Gygis alba microrhyncha), but is now recognised as a separate species.

== Taxonomy ==
The little white tern was first formally described by the British ornithologist Howard Saunders in 1876 under the binomial name Gygis microrhyncha meaning small (micro) bill (rhyncha). There are no recognized subspecies.

== Description ==
The little white tern is much smaller and has a more slender bill than any subspecies of the common white tern. It has been described as a "compact, goggle-eyed bird with shorter, more rounded wings and less deeply forked tail" when compared to Gygis alba. The calamus or 'quill' of the feather in the little white tern are notably white compared to black calamus found in common white terns.

== Distribution and habitat ==
The little white tern ranges throughout French Polynesia and the Republic of Kiribati, including the Phoenix and Line Islands, and was first described from three specimens from the Marquesas Islands.
