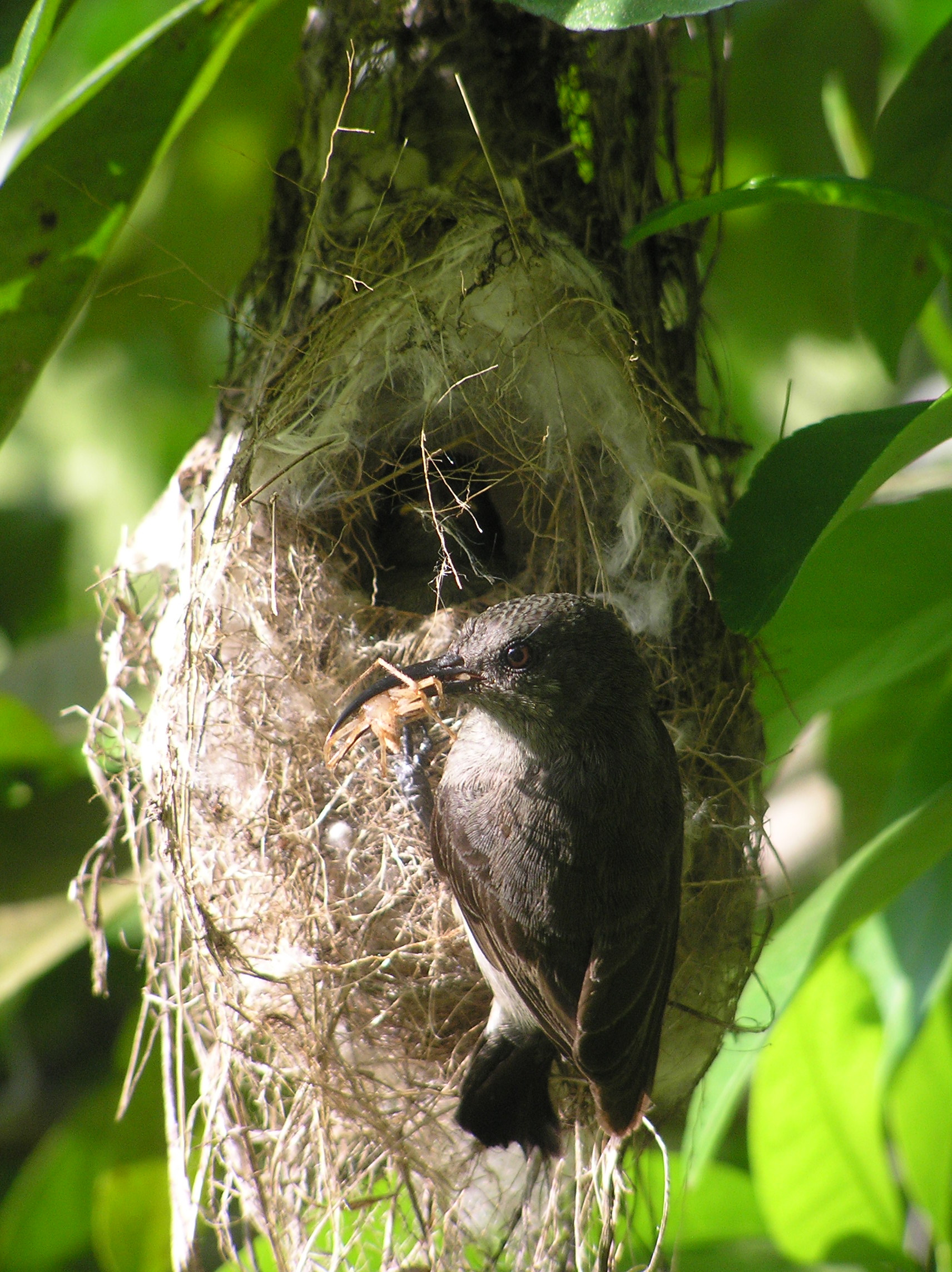
- Female at nest with arachnid in bill

Conservation status
- Least Concern (IUCN 3.1)

Scientific classification
- Kingdom: Animalia
- Phylum: Chordata
- Class: Aves
- Order: Passeriformes
- Family: Nectariniidae
- Genus: Cinnyris
- Species: C. dussumieri

Binomial name
- Cinnyris dussumieri (Hartlaub, 1861)

Synonyms
- Nectarinia dussumieri

= Seychelles sunbird =

Species of bird

The Seychelles sunbird (Cinnyris dussumieri) is a small passerine from the sunbird family. It is named after the French explorer Jean-Jacques Dussumier. It is native to the Seychelles, where it is known as kolibri in Seychellois Creole. This bird is placed in the genus Cinnyris by some authorities and in Nectarinia by others. Although this bird has a limited range, it is described as common and has a stable population, so the International Union for Conservation of Nature has rated its conservation status as being of "least concern".

== Description ==
It can reach a length from eleven to twelve centimetres. The plumage is dull grey. The male exhibits an iridescent violet-green sheen on its head and throat, brown underparts and yellow or orange tufts under its wings, which are more noticeable in flight. The long slender bill is downcurved. The legs are black. The female is an altogether duller-looking bird with pale grey underparts, and lacks the yellow pectoral tufts. The song of the males is high pitched, noisy and harsh, interspersed with various rasping calls. The female also sings.

== Distribution ==
The Seychelles sunbird occurs on most of the larger granitic islands of the Seychelles Bank. It belongs to the endemic landbird species of the Seychelles which had adapted to human made environment changes in the best way. Its habitat consists of forests, gardens, scrubs, and mangroves from sea level to altitudes of 900 m (2,953 ft).

== Diet ==
When foraging for food, this sunbird is very active, flying to hibiscus and other flowers with undulating flight and feeding of nectar and insects.

== Reproduction ==
Breeding is the entire year but the best time is September and October. One single egg is laid in a pear-shaped nest. It consists of grass and moss and is bound with spiderwebs. To protect the nest from cats and rats it hangs usually at the end of a twig.
