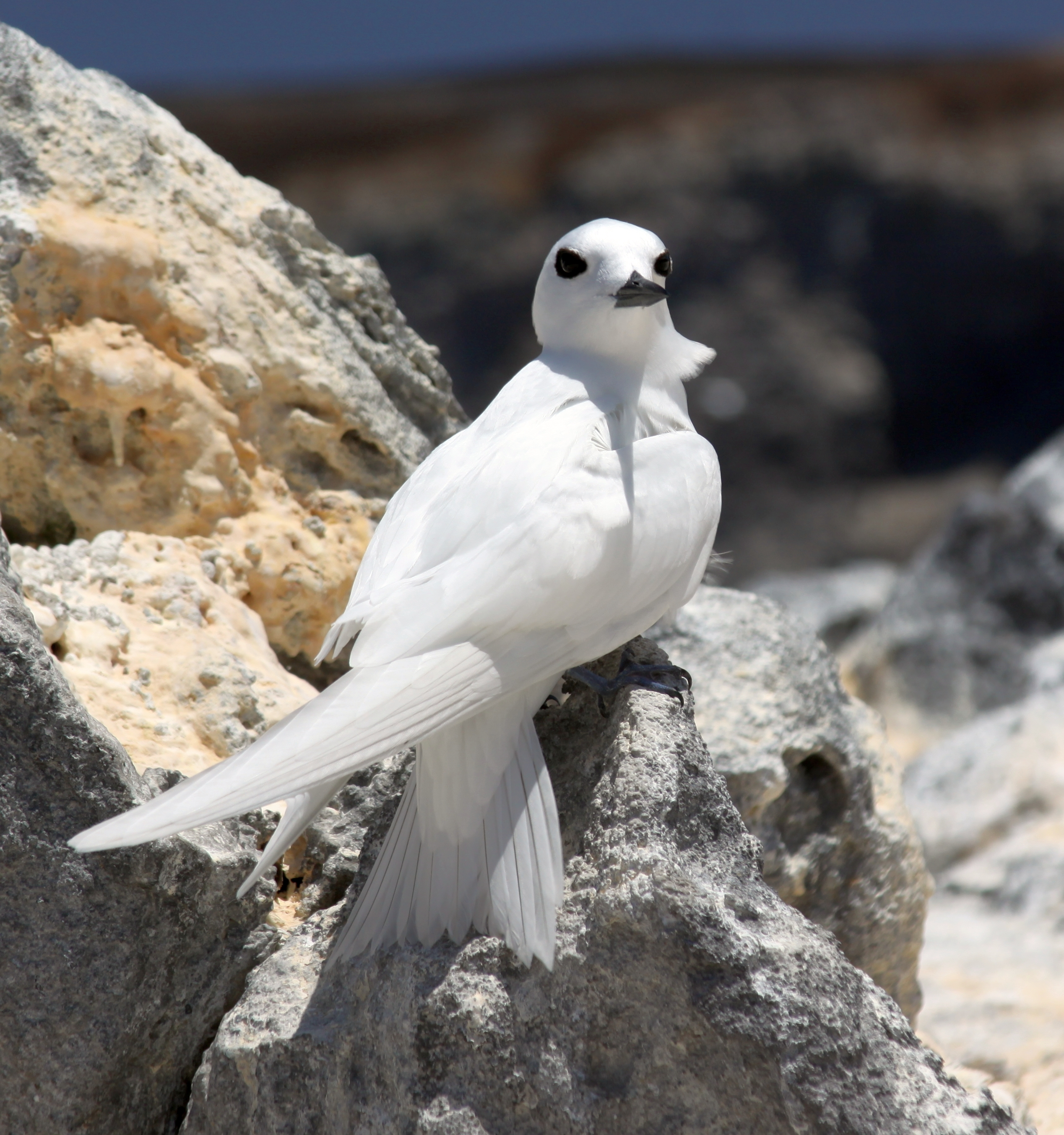

Scientific classification
- Kingdom: Animalia
- Phylum: Chordata
- Class: Aves
- Order: Charadriiformes
- Family: Laridae
- Subfamily: Gyginae
- Genus: Gygis; Wagler, 1832

Species
- Gygis alba; Gygis microrhyncha; Gygis candida

= White tern =

Species of bird

White terns consist of three species of terns in the genus Gygis and the family Laridae. There are three species of white terns - the Atlantic white tern (Gygis alba), the blue-billed white tern (Gygis candida) and the little white tern (Gygis microrhyncha).
