= Frégate Island =

Island in Seychelles

Fregate Island
- Location within Seychelles

Geography
- Location: Seychelles
- Coordinates: 4°35′48″S 55°56′48″E
- Archipelago: Inner Islands, Seychelles
- Adjacent to: Indian Ocean
- Total islands: 1
- Major islands: Frégate Island
- Area: 2.07 km^{2} (0.80 sq mi)
- Length: 1.6 km (0.99 mi)
- Width: 1.8 km (1.12 mi)
- Coastline: 6.35 km (3.946 mi)
- Highest elevation: 125 m (410 ft)
- Highest point: Mount Signal

Administration
- Seychelles
- Group: Inner Islands
- Sub-Group: Granitic Seychelles
- Districts: La Digue and Inner Islands
- Island Group: Frégate Group
- Largest settlement: Frégate village (pop. ~150)

Demographics
- Population: 214 (2014)
- Pop. density: 103.4/km^{2} (267.8/sq mi)
- Ethnic groups: Creole, French, East Africans, Indians.

Additional information
- Time zone: SCT (UTC+4)
- ISO code: SC-01
- Official website: www.fregate.com

Fregate Island (French: île de Frégate) is an island in Seychelles. The island is the easternmost of the granitic Inner Islands of the Seychelles (55 km (34 mi) east of Mahé). It is 2.07 square kilometres (0.80 square miles) and is primarily known for the Oetker Collection's secluded private luxury resort which funds an environmental programme to restore habitat and protect rare species. The beach on the island, Anse Victorin, often voted as "The World's Best Beach" by The Times.

It was also named CNN Travel Top 10 beaches.

It was named by explorer Lazare Picault after the abundance of frigate birds on the island. A modernisation programme in 2014 improved its sustainability infrastructure with a water bottling plant and state of the art energy generators, and also the renovation of 16 villas.

The island is covered with takamaka, cashew and Indian almond trees. After 200 years of intensive agricultural practices during the plantation era (which almost completely cleared the native woodland), the conservation team are restoring the natural habitat and have replanted over 10,000 indigenous trees including the very rare Wrights Gardenia, as well as the Indian Mulberry. The conservation programme has saved the Seychelles magpie robin from extinction; in 1980 the species numbered 14, yet in 2016 they numbered over 120.

The beaches are a nesting habitat for two species of sea turtle: the critically endangered Hawksbill Turtle and the endangered Green Turtle. Over 3,000 Aldabra giant tortoises roam free over the island. It also has endemic species including the flightless Fregate Island giant tenebrionid beetle, Fregate Island Enid snail, and some species of millipedes.

== Geography ==
The highest point on the island is Mount Signal in the central west area of the island, which has an elevation of 125 metres (410 feet). The Riviére Bambous flows from approximately 300 metres north-east of the mountain where it flows down past the Gros Bois Noire and Plaine Magnan areas of the northern inner island and then acutely northeast until it reaches the Indian Ocean north of the airstrip on the east coast.

Beaches on the north coast include from west to east the award-winning Anse Victorin beach, Anse Maquereau and then Anse Bambous on the north-east corner of the island. On the western point of the island there is La Cour and then on the southwest coast the Grand Anse, Petit Grande Anse and the small beach Anse Felix. On the southeastern coast there are the small beaches of Anse Coup de Poing and Anse Parc.

Fregate Island Private is renowned for snorkeling and diving. It is near the Drop Off for deep sea fishing and participates in the Seychelles Bill Fish society tag and release programme.

== Economy ==
The population is occupied in conservation, tourism, agriculture and fishing. On Fregate Island Private there is the biggest Flora nursery of the Seychelles, created in 2009 to restore tens of thousands of native trees. A sophisticated hydroponic system and garden produces vegetables, fruits and herbs for the island and supplies some neighbouring islands.

Sixteen villas were built to attract luxury tourism to fund the conservation project. The island can be privatised for up to 79 guests. There are 2 restaurants, a spa, a yacht club, a library, a Catholic chapel and museum. Transport is by golf buggy, bicycle or foot.

Fregate Island Private has its own harbour; anybody wishing to visit the island by boat must produce a rat free license, as the island is entirely pest free which is vital to maintain the fragile environmental balance. The island has a helicopter landing pad and Frégate Island Airport (IATA: FRK, ICAO: FSSF ), which has a dirt runway with a length of 502 meters.
