= Wildlife of Seychelles =

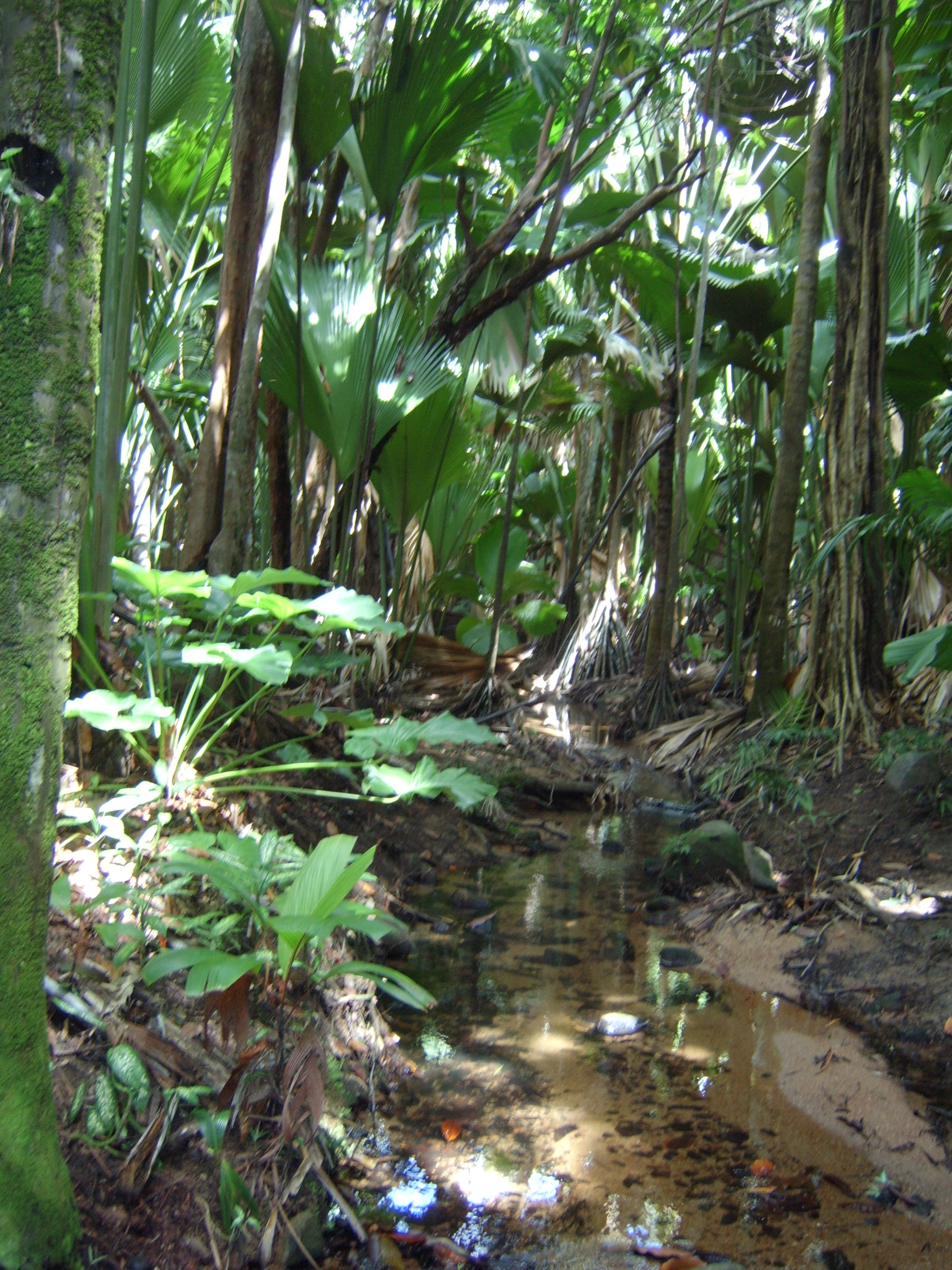
The Vallée de Mai habitat, on the island of Praslin, Seychelles.

The wildlife of Seychelles comprises the flora and fauna of the Seychelles islands off the eastern coast of Africa in the western Indian Ocean.

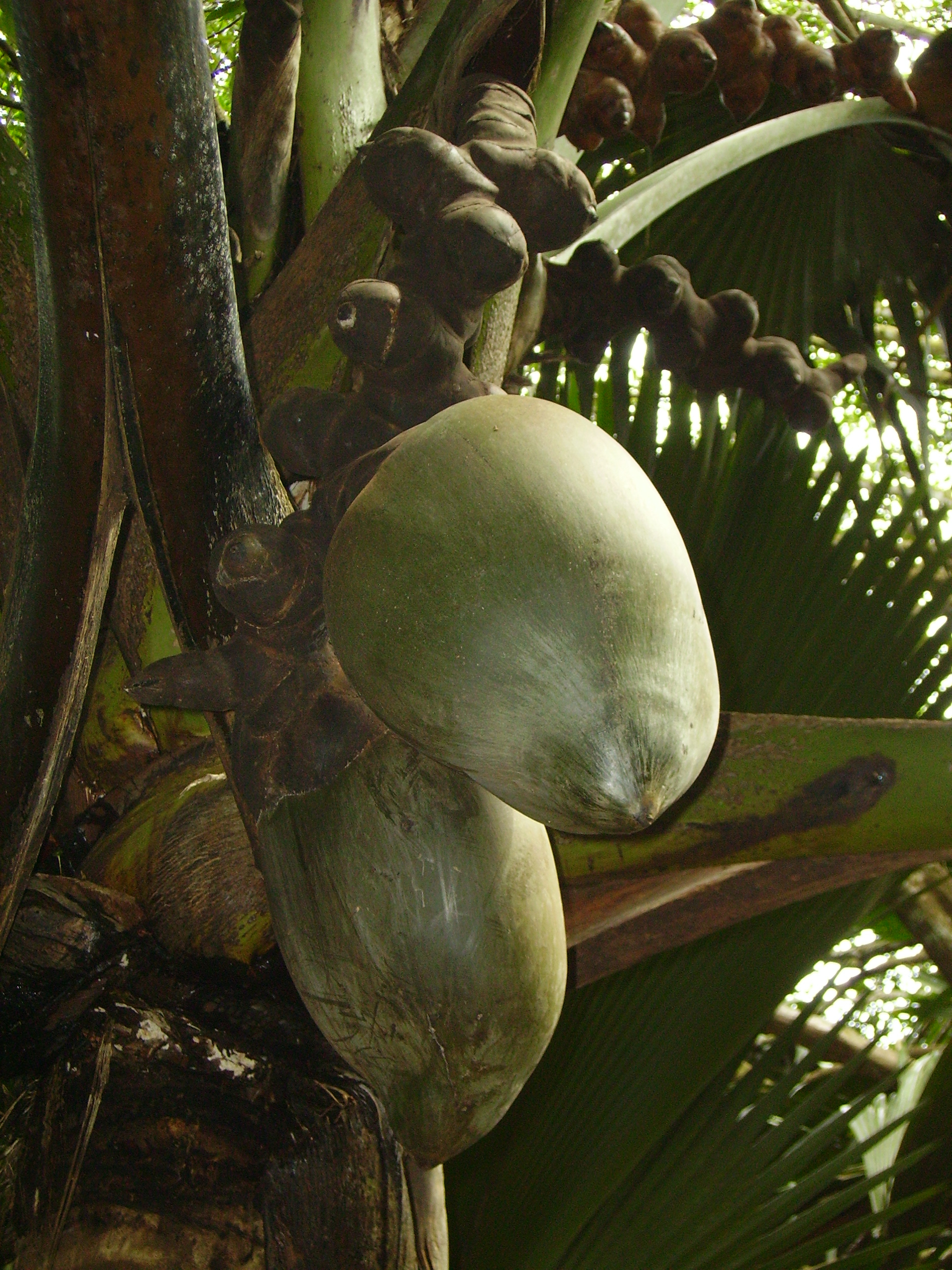
The endemic palm coco de mer (Lodoicea maldivica)

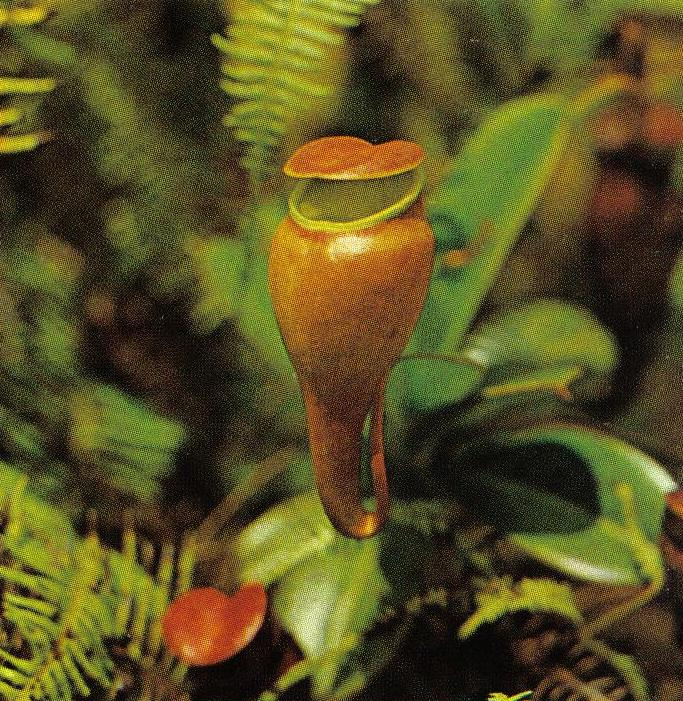
Nepenthes pervillei, a carnivorous plant endemic on the islands of Mahé and Silhouette, Seychelles

== Human history and fauna ==
In common with many fragile island ecosystems, the early human history of Seychelles saw the loss of biodiversity including the disappearance of most of the giant tortoises from the granitic islands, felling of coastal and mid-level forests and extinction of species such as the Marianne white-eye, Seychelles parakeet, Aldabra brush warbler, and the saltwater crocodile. However, extinctions were far fewer than on other islands such as Mauritius or Hawaii, partly due to a shorter period of human occupation (since 1770). The Seychelles today is known for success stories in protecting its flora and fauna.

Arguably the first scientific study of Seychelles was that of the Marion Dufresne expedition in 1768, two years prior to settlement. Dufresne instructed Duchemin, captain of the vessel La Digue, to "especially give the greatest attention to the study and prospects of all the species of inland productions such as trees, bushes, plants, herbs, quadruped animals, birds, insects, freshwater fish, stones, soil, minerals. Nothing is unimportant. You must not avoid giving details and descriptions- everything is worthy of attention". Their observations remain an intriguing window on Seychelles prior to human interference.

Subsequent to settlement, Fairfax Moresby's hydrographic survey in 1822, was the first scientific study in the islands, while early collectors included Pervillé, Wright and Mobius from the early to mid-19th century. The first major avian collector was Newton in 1865 followed by Lantz in 1877, both in the granitic islands. Abbott collected in the granitic islands in 1890 and in the Aldabra group in 1893. Voeltzkow also made general natural history collections on Aldabra in 1895.

In 1882, Coppinger made extensive collections and observations. Several expeditions followed, the most significant of which was the Percy Sladen Expedition aboard Sealark in 1905, when Gardiner made extensive collections in the granitics and outer islands. His collections for some islands remain the only records available into the 21st century.

Studies after Gardiner were sparse up to the 1950s, though some residents of Seychelles made valuable contributions, notably Dupont, Thomasset, Baty and Vesey Fitzgerald. Visiting oceanographic expeditions also made some collections. In the 1950s, Smith conducted a major study of marine fish, while Jacques Cousteau also visited in 1954 aboard the RV Calypso. Legrand collected Lepidoptera in the 1950s, while the Bristol University expedition of 1964–1965 focussed on birds and insects.

The contribution of Royal Society to the knowledge of Aldabra from 1966 is legendary and work on Aldabra continued under the custodianship of Seychelles Islands Foundation

== Present day conservation ==
In more modern times, International Council for Bird Preservation (ICBP, now BirdLife International) conducted a great deal of research on Cousin Island. In the second half of the 1980s and during the 1990s, many reports and published papers for the granitic islands were the result of work conducted on Aride Island first by Royal Society for Nature Conservation (now Royal Society of Wildlife Trusts) and then by the local NGO Island Conservation Society in Ramos National Park, summarised in annual reports from 1987 to the present. Extensive scientific research has been carried out since the 1990s and much of this is published in Seychelles in the scientific journal Phelsuma (published by Nature Protection Trust of Seychelles).

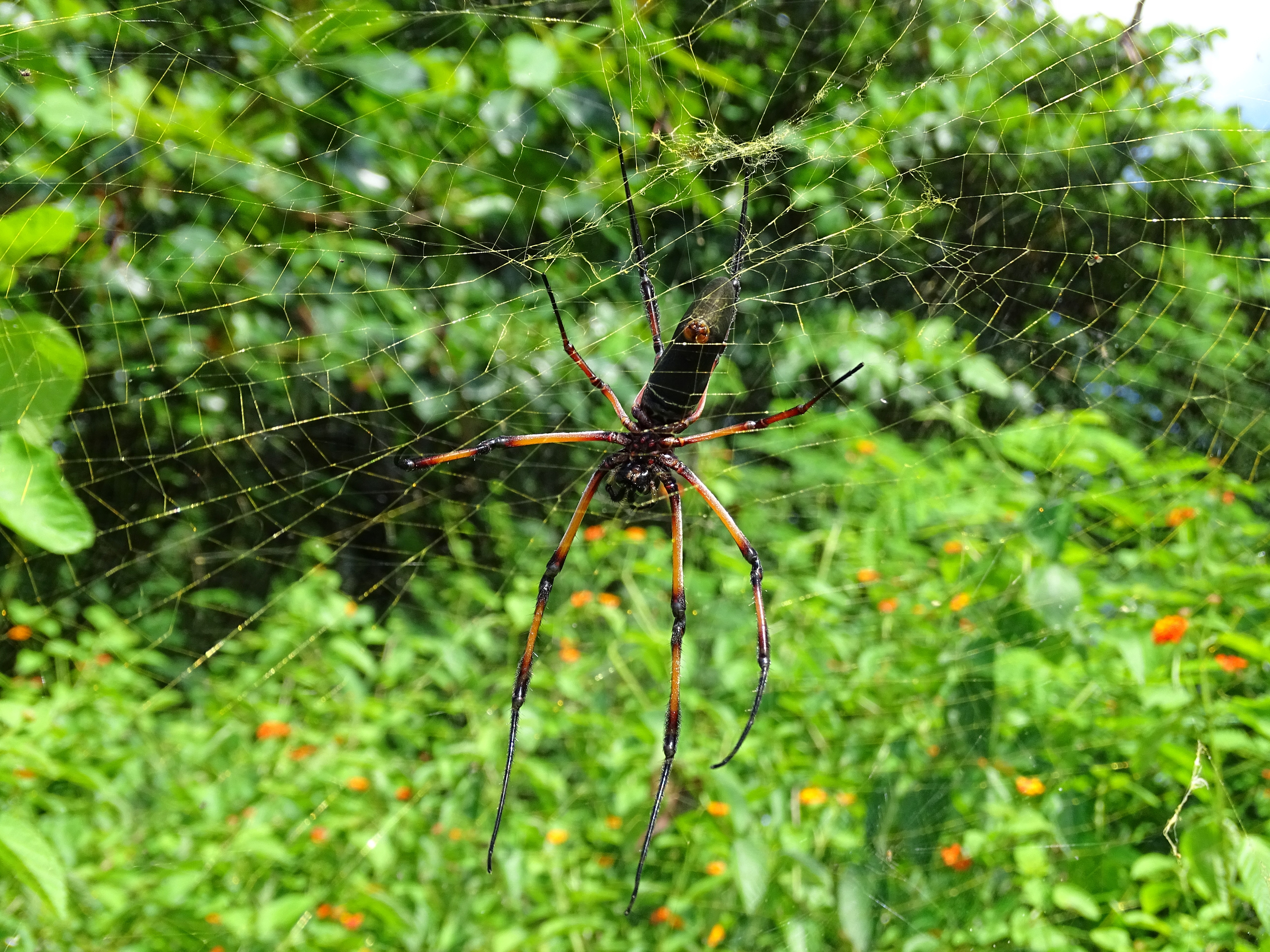
The palm spider, Seychelles

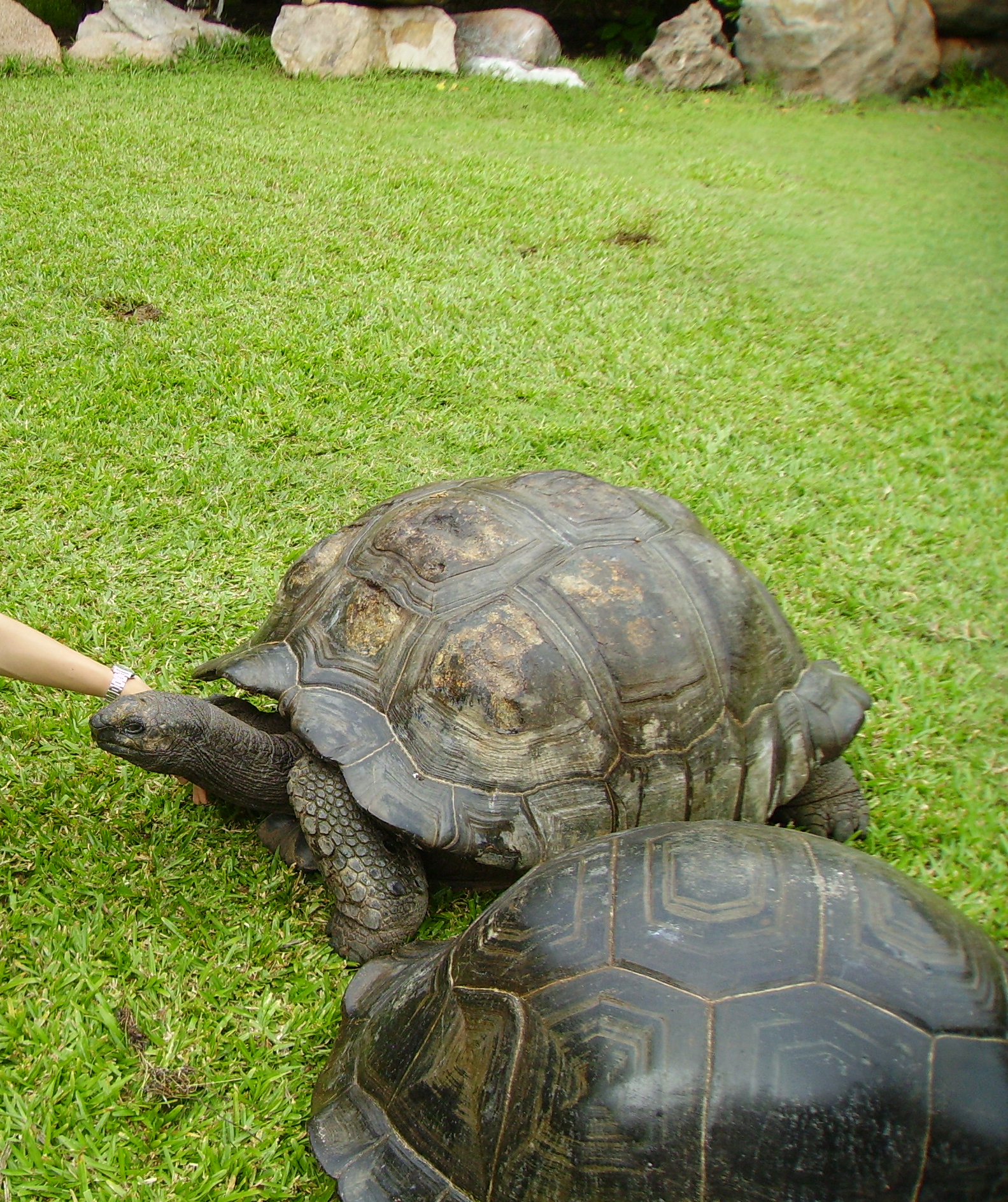
The giant tortoise (Aldabrachelys gigantea) on Aldabra, a Seychelles giant tortoise

Although many of the conservation laws date back to British colonial days, the Seychelles government has strictly protected the natural heritage of the islands for many years.

Seychelles is home to two UNESCO World Heritage Sites run by the Seychelles Islands Foundation. They are the atoll of Aldabra, which is the world's largest raised coral atoll and also the Vallée de Mai on Praslin island, billed as the original site of the Garden of Eden. The Cousin Island Special Reserve, purchased by International Council for Bird Preservation (ICBP, now BirdLife International) in 1968 and managed by Nature Seychelles, is an internationally known bird and marine sanctuary which has won several awards for conservation and ecotourism. Seychelles has six national marine parks including the Sainte Anne Marine National Park located adjacent to the capital, Port Victoria which are managed by the government parastatal, Marine Parks Authority. Much of the land territory (about 40%) and a substantial part of the coastal sea around Seychelles are protected as national parks, including marine parks, and reserves. Seychelles will soon become the first country to have half its land protected.

A World Bank/Environment Facility project in 1999 and a project for rat eradication has led to a programme of restoration of private islands by the government, Nature Seychelles and private island owners. These islands include Fregate, Denis and Cousine. The management of these islands now employ full-time conservation officers and fund conservation programmes. The island restoration program has now been taken to the outer islands by the Island Conservation Society, with the first Island Conservation Centre opened at Alphonse Atoll in 2007. The Island Conservation Society has also implemented conservation programmes on Conception, North Island, Cosmoledo Atoll and Farquhar Atoll.

== Flora species ==
The granitic islands of Seychelles are home to about 75 endemic plant species, with a further 25 or so species in the Aldabra group. Particularly well known is the coco de mer, a species of palm that grows only on the islands of Praslin and neighbouring Curieuse. Sometimes nicknamed the "love nut" because of its suggestive shape, the coco de mer is the world's largest seed. The jellyfish tree is to be found in only a few locations today. This strange and ancient plant has resisted all efforts to propagate it. Other unique plant species include the Rothmannia annae found only on Aride Island Special Reserve.

Lodoicea maldivica (sea coconut), Deckenia nobilis (cabbage palm), Nephrosperma vanhoutteanum, Phoenicophorium borsigianum (thief palm), Roscheria melanochaetes, and Verschaffeltia splendida (stilt palm), all of which are the only species in their respective genera, are palm trees endemic to the Seychelles.

== Fauna species ==
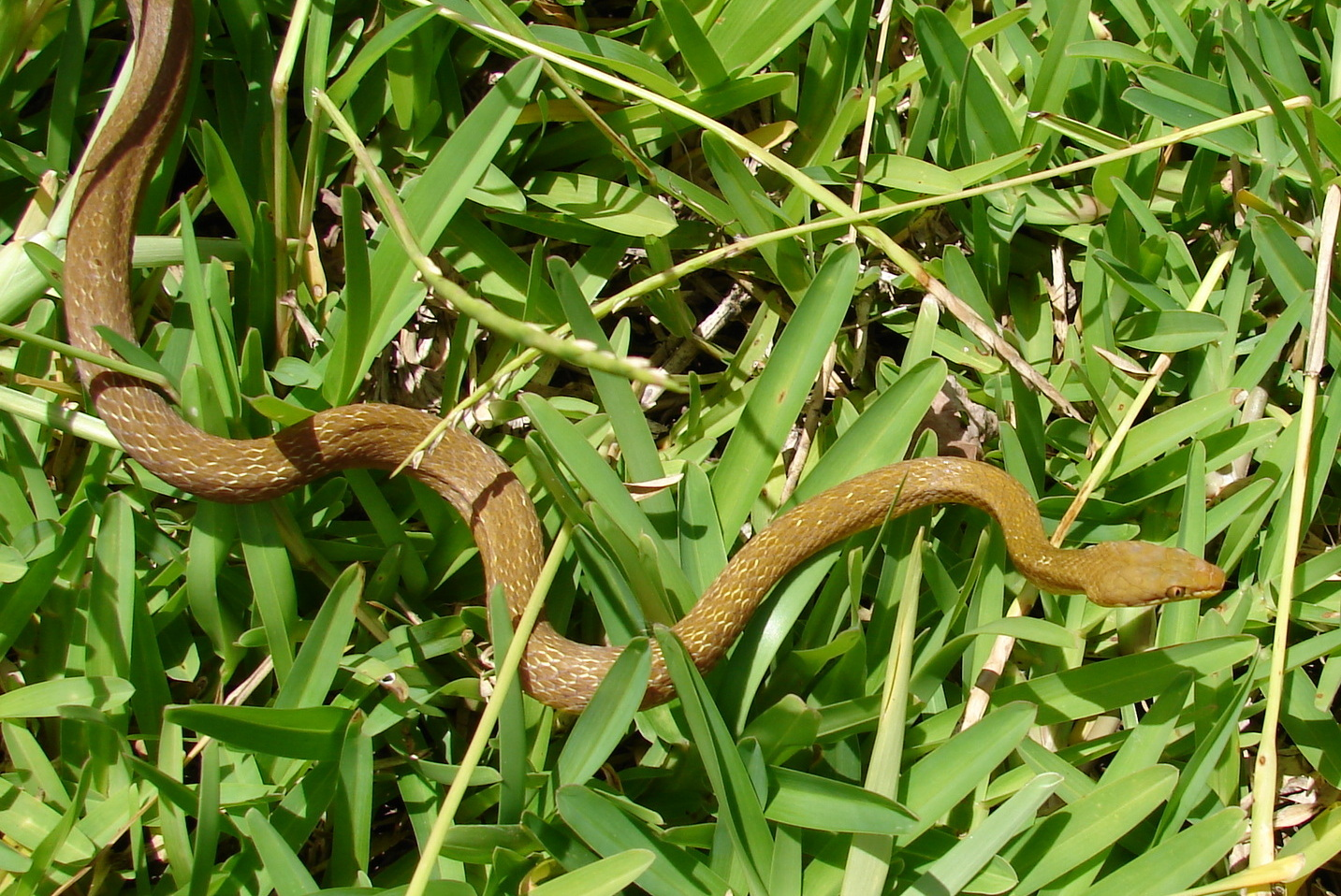
Seychelles wolf snake, an endemic snake species of Seychelles

The giant tortoises (Aldabrachelys) from Aldabra now populate many of the islands of the Seychelles. The Aldabra population is the largest in the world. These reptiles can be found even in captive herds. It has been reported that the granitic islands of Seychelles supported distinct species of Seychelles giant tortoises, but the status of the different populations is currently unclear. Two of them, Arnolds giant tortoise and the Seychelles giant tortoise are in the process of being re-introduced, after some individuals were discovered surviving among Aldabra populations.

Flagship species include: the Seychelles magpie robin and the Seychelles warbler, have been spectacularly rescued from the brink of extinction by BirdLife International, Royal Society of Wildlife Trusts, Island Conservation Society, Nature Seychelles, private islands (Fregate and Denis) and the Government of Seychelles. These birds, once restricted to one island each, have been translocated to many others. The national bird is the rare Seychelles black parrot. Seychelles has 12 endemic bird species. These are the Aldabra drongo, Seychelles magpie robin, Seychelles paradise flycatcher, Seychelles fody, Seychelles scops-owl, Seychelles white-eye, Seychelles swiftlet, Seychelles kestrel, Seychelles blue pigeon, Seychelles bulbul, Seychelles warbler and Seychelles sunbird. In addition, the islands were formerly home to the Seychelles parakeet, a species that became extinct in the late 1800s.

Seychelles hosts some of the largest seabird colonies in the world. Islands such as Bird, Aride Island, Cousin, Aldabra and Cosmoledo host many species of seabirds including the sooty tern, fairy tern, white-tailed tropicbird, noddies and frigatebirds. Aride Island has more species of seabird and greater numbers than the other 40 granite islands combined including the world's largest colony of tropical shearwater and lesser noddy.

The marine life around the islands, especially the more remote coral islands, can be spectacular. More than 1000 species of fish have been recorded. Since the use of spearguns and dynamite for fishing was banned through efforts of local conservationists in the 1960s, the wildlife is unafraid of snorkelers and divers. Coral bleaching in 1998 has unfortunately damaged most reefs, but some reefs show healthy recovery (e.g. Silhouette Island. The reefs comprise a vast selection of soft corals and hard corals alike. There is great diving and snorkelling opportunity. The taking of marine turtles was completely stopped in 1994, and turtle populations are now recovering on several protected islands, most notably Cousin Island, Aride Island, Silhouette Island and Aldabra. However, they continue to decline at unprotected sites. The use of gill nets for shark fishing as well as the practice of shark finning are now banned.

The Seychelles are home to 26 species of terrestrial or semi-terrestrial crabs, and 5 species of terrestrial hermit crab, including the world's largest terrestrial invertebrate, the coconut crab (Birgus latro). The granitic Seychelles are home to the country's only true freshwater crab, Seychellum alluaudi, which is endemic to the archipelago. Unusually for oceanic islands amphibians are native. Six species of frog are found here, five endemic and one introduced, as well as six endemic species of caecilian: Praslin's caecilian, the Frigate Island caecilian and four species of Grandisonia. There are 20 species of lizard, including geckos, skinks, the Madagascar girdled lizard and the endemic chameleon Archaius tigris, as well as three land snakes (two native and one introduced).

== See also ==
- List of birds of the Seychelles
- List of mammals in the Seychelles
- List of amphibians of Seychelles
- List of non-marine molluscs of the Seychelles
- Index: Flora of Seychelles
