= List of amphibians of Seychelles =

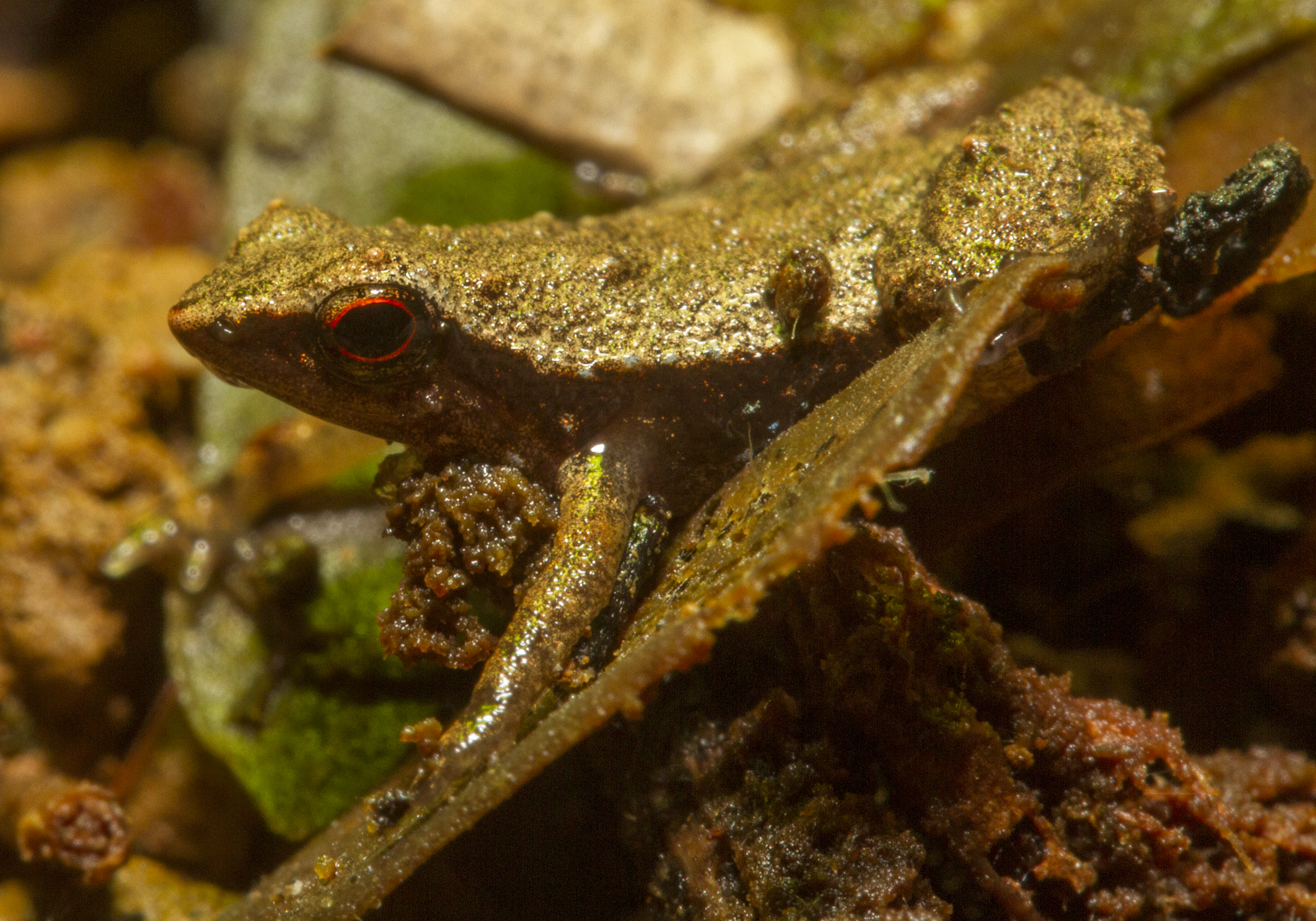
Sechellophryne gardineri from Mahé

There are 14 identified species of amphibians in Seychelles, 13 of which are endemic. Because they require access to damp conditions they are absent from the coralline Outer Islands which lack fresh water. Instead they are common among the granitic Inner Islands, which have abundant fresh water sources. Their habitats include the tropical forests of Mahé, Praslin, and Silhouette islands, particularly at higher altitudes.

== Species ==
=== Family Hyperoliidae (sedge frogs) ===
- Genus Tachycnemis
  - Tachycnemis seychellensis (Seychelles treefrog)

=== Family Ptychadenidae (grassland frogs) ===
- Genus Ptychadena
  - Ptychadena mascareniensis (Mascarene grass frog)

=== Family Sooglossidae (Seychelles frogs) ===
- Genus Sechellophryne
  - Sechellophryne gardineri (Gardiner's Seychelles frog)
  - Sechellophryne pipilodryas (Seychelles palm frog)
- Genus Sooglossus
  - Sooglossus sechellensis (Seychelles frog)
  - Sooglossus thomasseti (Thomasset's Seychelles frog)

=== Family Grandisoniidae (common caecilians) ===
- Genus Grandisonia
  - Grandisonia alternans (Stejneger's caecilian)
  - Grandisonia larvata
  - Grandisonia sechellensis (Seychelles caecilian)
- Genus Hypogeophis
  - Hypogeophis brevis
  - Hypogeophis montanus
  - Hypogeophis pti (little Praslin caecilian)
  - Hypogeophis rostratus (Frigate Island caecilian)
- Genus Praslinia
  - Praslinia cooperi (Cooper's black caecilian), despite its name it is not found on Praslin
