= Ver de terre =

Ver de terre (plural: vers de terre) is French for earthworm.

It can also refer to any of the caecilians found in the Seychelles, namely:

- Grandisonia alternans
- Grandisonia brevis
- Grandisonia larvata
- Grandisonia sechellensis
- Hypogeophis rostratus
- Praslinia cooperi
