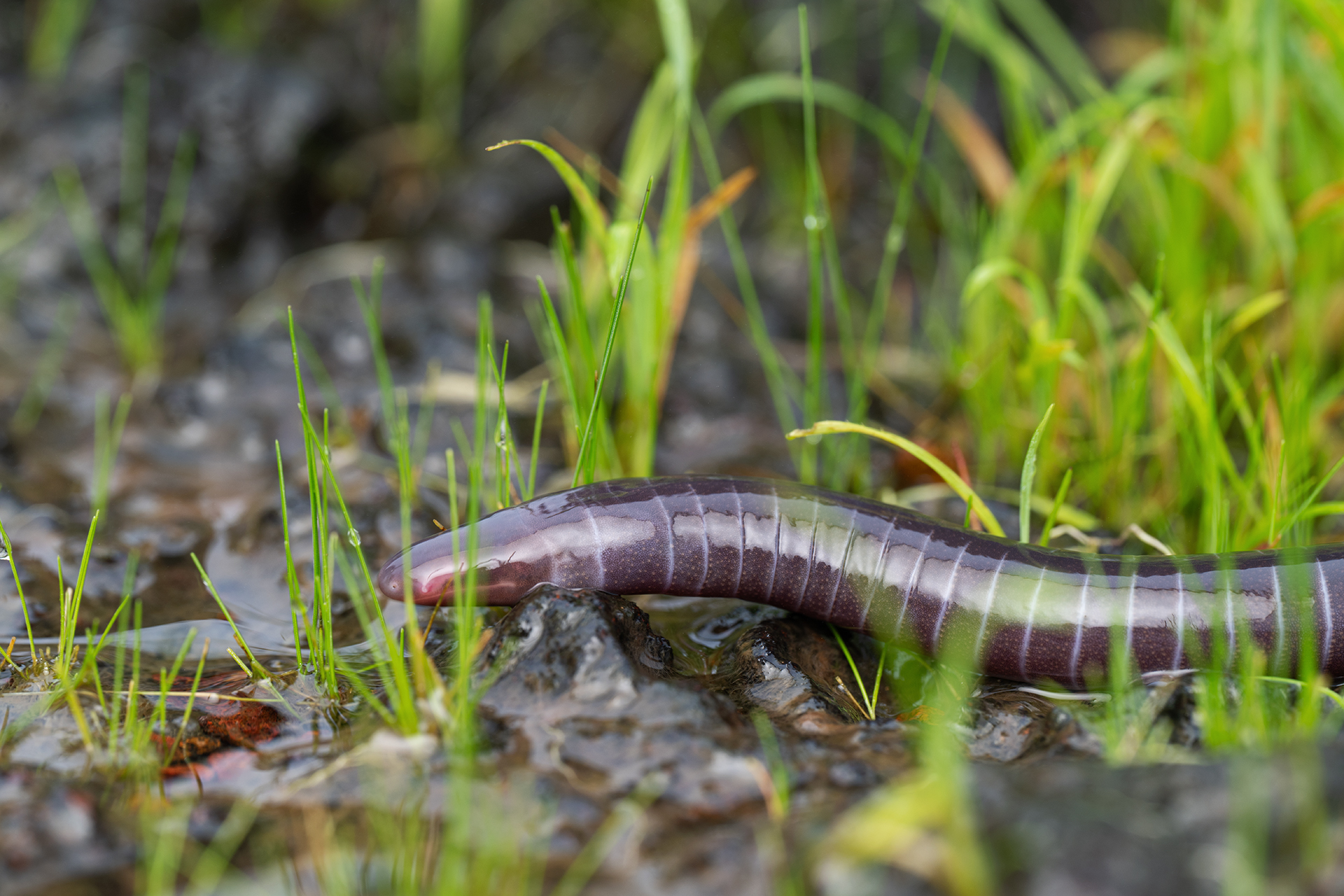

Conservation status
- Data Deficient (IUCN 3.1)

Scientific classification
- Kingdom: Animalia
- Phylum: Chordata
- Class: Amphibia
- Order: Gymnophiona
- Clade: Apoda
- Family: Grandisoniidae
- Genus: Gegeneophis
- Species: G. mhadeiensis

Binomial name
- Gegeneophis mhadeiensis Bhatta, Dinesh, Prashanth & Kulkarni, 2007

= Gegeneophis mhadeiensis =

Species of amphibian

Gegeneophis mhadeiensis, commonly known as the Mahadeyi caecilian, Mhadei caecilian, or Mhadei's blind caecilian, is a species of caecilian belonging to the family Grandisoniidae. It is endemic to the Western Ghats in southern India, and is threatened by habitat loss.

== Etymology ==
The specific name, mhadeiensis, refers to the type locality on the bank of a tributary of the Mhadei river.

== Distribution ==
The species is currently known from its type locality in Chorla village, Belgaum district in the state of Karnataka in India. It can tolerate disturbed habitats. Although it is endemic to the Western Ghats, the actual extent of its distribution remains unknown.

== Description ==
The species has a total body length of 180–202 mm (7.1–8.0 in). It has a sub-cylindrical and slightly dorsoventrally compressed body. It is uniform in width. The anterior portion of its head tapers and terminates in a narrow snout tip. The posterior part of its head is somewhat narrower than the nuchal region. The margin of its upper lip is slightly arched. Its teeth are recurved and monocuspid.

The species is mostly dark brown in colour. It has a pinkish-brown head, and white annular grooves.

== Habitat ==
Gegeneophis mhadeiensis occurs in forests, plantations and along streams. It is a burrowing animal. It is threatened by fertilizers and pesticides.
