= Deckenia =

Deckenia may refer to:

- Deckenia (plant), a genus of palm trees
- Deckenia (crab), a genus of freshwater crabs
