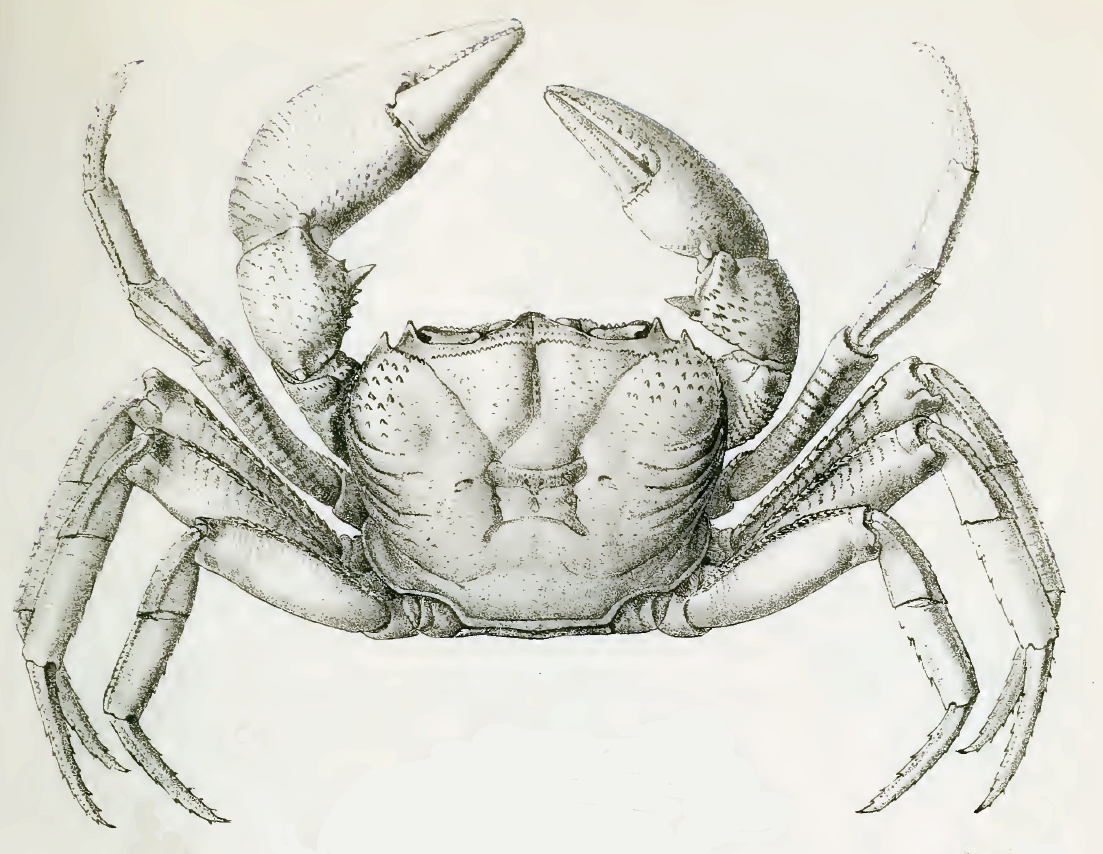
- Drawing of dorsal view of Seychellum alluaudi

Conservation status
- Vulnerable (IUCN 3.1)

Scientific classification
- Kingdom: Animalia
- Phylum: Arthropoda
- Class: Malacostraca
- Order: Decapoda
- Suborder: Pleocyemata
- Infraorder: Brachyura
- Family: Deckeniidae
- Genus: Seychellum; Ng, Števčić & Pretzmann, 1995
- Species: S. alluaudi

Binomial name
- Seychellum alluaudi (A. Milne-Edwards & Bouvier, 1893)

Synonyms
- Deckenia alluaudi A. Milne-Edwards & Bouvier, 1893; Deckenia cristata Rathbun, 1894

= Seychellum =

Genus of crabs

Seychellum alluaudi is a species of freshwater crab endemic to the Seychelles, and the only true freshwater crab in that country. It lives in rainforest streams on the archipelago's granitic high islands. Although it may be abundant, little is known about its biology. If its habitat were to decline in quality, S. alluaudi might become endangered, but it is currently listed as Vulnerable on the IUCN Red List.

Seychellum alluaudi was described as a species of Deckenia in 1893 and 1894, and later split off into the monotypic segregate genus Seychellum. Its closest relatives are the two species currently in Deckenia, both of which are found in East Africa. Several hypotheses have been published to explain how Seychellum reached its isolated location, including submerged "land bridges" and ancient vicariance, although some means of transport across the open ocean is considered the most likely explanation.

Adults are dark yellow to brown in colour, and have a quadrangular carapace with a width of around 50 mm (2 in). The claws are unequal in size. Seychellum differs from Deckenia in a number of characters, including the lengths of the legs and antennae, and the fact that Deckenia species have flattened legs, compared to those of Seychellum.

== Description ==
Seychellum alluaudi is the only truly freshwater crab in the Seychelles; all the other true crabs in the islands have marine larvae. It is common for freshwater crabs to have large eggs, and this is also seen in Seychellum; its eggs are around 3.5 mm (0.14 in) in diameter, which Rathbun described as "very large".

Adult specimens reach a carapace width of 30–52 millimetres (1.2–2.0 in), and a carapace length about 80% of the width. The carapace is almost quadrangular and quite flat, in contrast to the more rounded outline in its closest relative, Deckenia. Its surface is rough, with scattered tubercles, and is divided into distinct regions by a series of grooves. A raised ridge runs sinuously along the front of the carapace, interrupted by a groove in the centre and by grooves towards each side of the carapace. The colour of Seychellum is described as "jaune noirâtre, qui devient franchement marron dans la moitié antérieure de la carapace" ("dark yellow, which becomes quite brown in the anterior part of the carapace").

The antennae are minute (smaller than those of Deckenia), and the chelae (claws) are unequal in size. Whereas Deckenia has distinctly flattened walking legs, those of Seychellum are normal. Overall, Rathbun concluded that Seychellum alluaudi "differs from Deckenia [...] in so many other respects that the species are not likely to be confounded".

== Taxonomic history ==
Seychellum alluaudi was first described in 1893 by Alphonse Milne-Edwards and Eugène Louis Bouvier, as a species in the genus Deckenia, D. alluaudi; the specific epithet commemorates Charles A. Alluaud, who had collected the specimens they used. Unaware of that description, Mary J. Rathbun described "Deckenia cristata" in 1894, in a paper published in the Proceedings of the United States National Museum; her description was based on specimens donated to the United States National Museum by William Louis Abbott, who had travelled to the Seychelles in 1890. At the time, the only other species in the genus was D. imitatrix from the coast of East Africa, and a second species (D. mitis), also from East Africa, was added in 1898. Rathbun synonymised D. cristata and D. alluaudi herself in 1906. The three species of Deckenia at that time were considered to be sufficiently distinct from other crabs to warrant placement in a separate subfamily (Deckeniinae) or family (Deckeniidae).

In 1995, Peter K. L. Ng, Zdravko Števčić and Gerhard Pretzmann revised the family Deckeniidae, as then circumscribed, and concluded that "D. alluaudi" could not be accommodated with the other species of Deckenia in the same genus, or even in the same family. They described a new genus, Seychellum, and the species took on its current name. They placed Seychellum in the family Gecarcinucidae, leaving Deckenia as the only genus in the family Deckeniidae, and restricting its distribution to the African mainland. Following a number of phylogenetic studies, Cumberlidge et al. reduced that taxon to a subfamily of the larger family Potamonautidae, and Seychellum is again considered a part of it.

== Distribution and biogeography ==
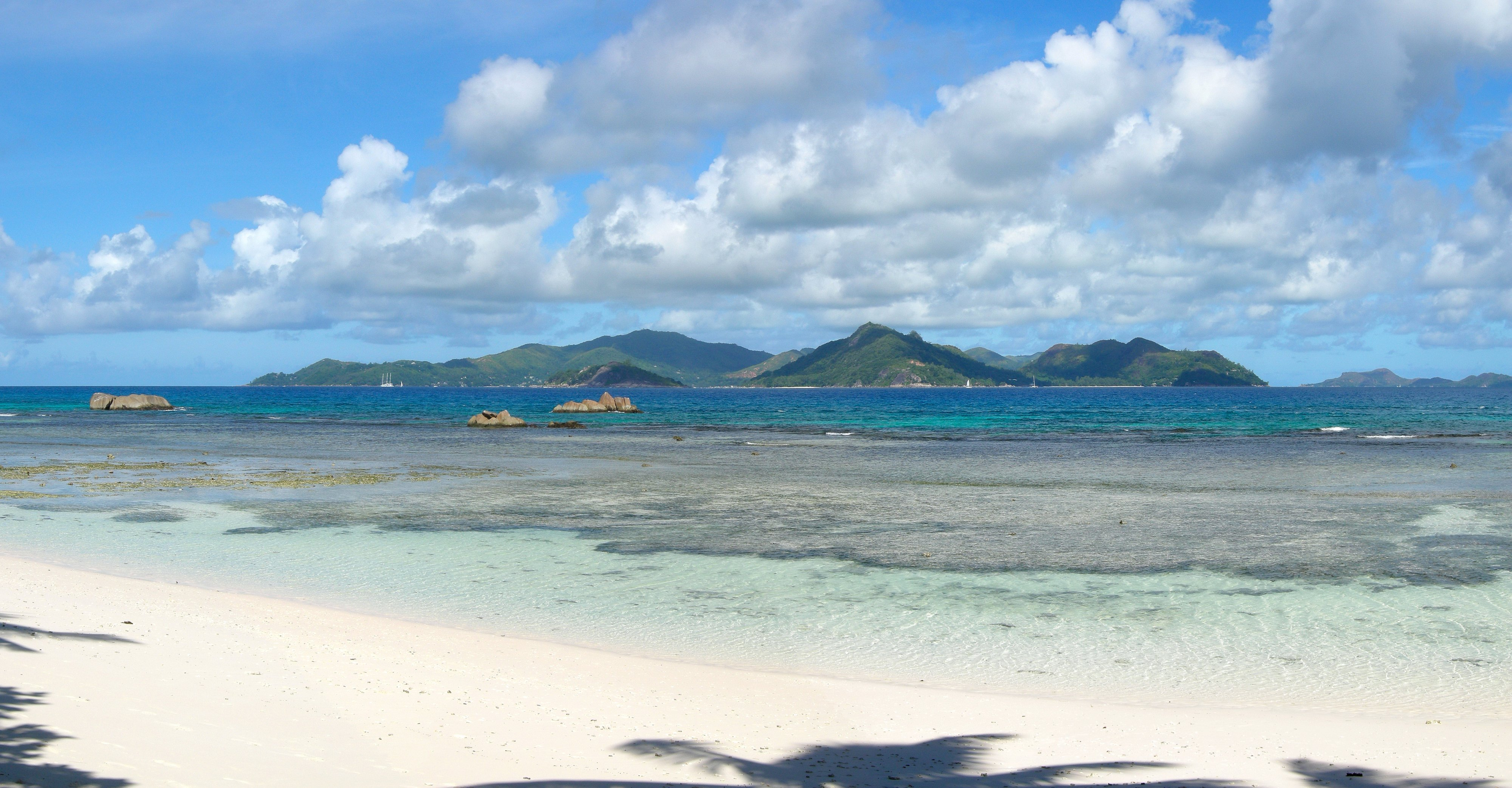
Praslin, the second largest island in the Seychelles, is one of the islands where Seychellum alluaudi lives.

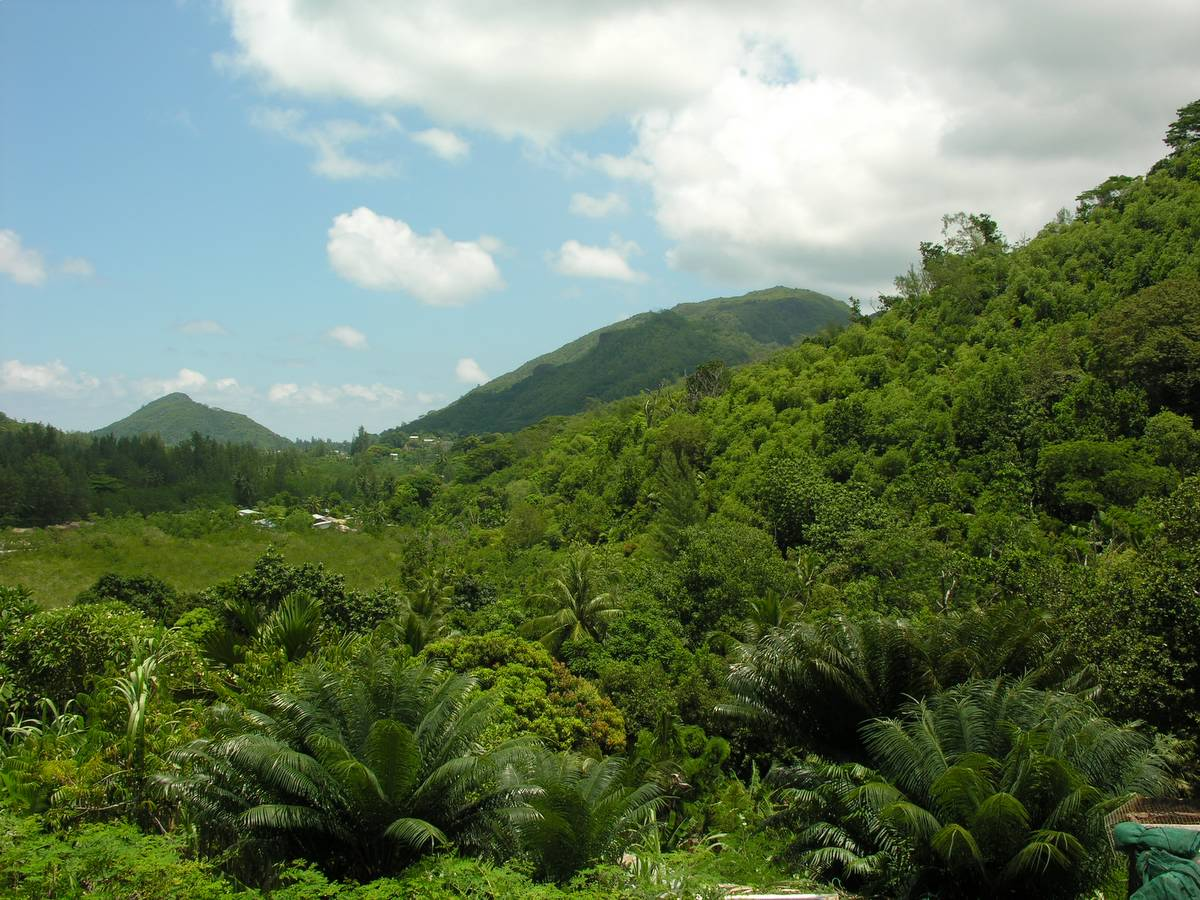
Seychellum alluaudi lives in streams among montane rainforest.

Seychellum alluaudi is endemic to the granitic high islands in the inner group of the Seychelles, in the western Indian Ocean. It is found on the four largest granitic islands – Mahé, La Digue, Silhouette and Praslin – and lives in mountain streams that flow through rainforest.

The closest relatives of Seychellum are the two species of Deckenia from the African mainland. The two-lobed shape of the last segment of the mandibular palp, which had been used to argue for a close relationship between Seychellum and Indian crabs of the family Gecarcinucidae, does not appear to be a reliable phylogenetic character.

The presence of a strictly freshwater species on the Seychelles is hard to explain, biogeographically. Several possible explanations have been proposed.

- In 1902, prior to the development of plate tectonics, Arnold Edward Ortmann proposed that land bridges formerly connected the Seychelles to other land masses.
- It has also been suggested that the ancestors of Deckenia and Seychellum lived on a landmass comprising Seychelles and the African mainland, which then separated by continental drift; Gondwana is believed to have split up 160 million years ago, with the Seychelles separating from the Indian Plate around 68 to 65 million years ago. An ancient origin would be supported by the absence of freshwater crabs from oceanic islands in the same area, such as Mauritius and Réunion.
- Finally, the ancestor of Seychellum may have travelled across the western Indian Ocean by rafting, perhaps at a time when the Seychelles Bank was larger due to lower sea levels. The greater extent of the Seychelles Bank may also explain how the species is now found on four separate islands in the Seychelles archipelago. The time of divergence between Seychellum and Deckenia has been estimated independently at 27 to 8 million years ago and 12 to 5.5 million years ago. Seychellum is reported to be more tolerant of salt water than other families of freshwater crabs, which may have allowed it to survive rafting between the African continent and the Seychelles Bank.

The most recent research favours trans-oceanic dispersal, but some uncertainty remains.

== Conservation status ==
Of the five criteria assessed by the International Union for Conservation of Nature for its IUCN Red List, four cannot be assessed in Seychellum alluaudi because of a lack of information. Under the remaining criterion, which measures the species' geographic range, the species would qualify as Endangered if there were a "decline in habitat quality". It is, however, abundant in places, and is present within a protected area, and is therefore listed as Vulnerable.
