= Gegeneophis madhavai =

Conservation status
- Data Deficient (IUCN 3.1)

Scientific classification
- Kingdom: Animalia
- Phylum: Chordata
- Class: Amphibia
- Order: Gymnophiona
- Clade: Apoda
- Family: Grandisoniidae
- Genus: Gegeneophis
- Species: G. madhavai

Binomial name
- Gegeneophis madhavai Bhatta & Srinivasa, 2004

Species of amphibian

Gegeneophis madhavai, the Mudur caecilian, is a species of caecilian found in India. It is only known from its type locality Mudur village, Kundapura Taluk in Udupi district in Karnataka.
