= Battersby's caecilian =

Conservation status
- Data Deficient (IUCN 3.1)

Scientific classification
- Kingdom: Animalia
- Phylum: Chordata
- Class: Amphibia
- Order: Gymnophiona
- Clade: Apoda
- Family: Grandisoniidae
- Genus: Indotyphlus
- Species: I. battersbyi

Binomial name
- Indotyphlus battersbyi Taylor, 1960

Species of amphibian

Battersby's caecilian (Indotyphlus battersbyi) is a slender species of caecilian endemic to the Western Ghats, India. It has a flesh-coloured body, making it look very much like a large earthworm.

== Description ==
The eyes of Battersby's caecilian are concealed under the skin and are feebly visible. It is also known as the tailless caecilian, as the body ends in a blunt shield. The vent in this species is transverse as opposed to longitudinal in most other species of Indian caecilians. The total length is 17–23.8 cm (6.7–9.4 in).

== Distribution and status ==
Battersby's caecilian is distributed in the Western Ghats in Maharashtra and Kerala (India).

The population is unknown and threats are also not well known but are thought to be land changes for agriculture, wood and timber extracting by locals, road construction, agrochemical soil pollution and fires. It occurs in Sanjay Gandhi National Park and may occur in Koyna Wildlife Sanctuary and Phansad Wildlife Sanctuary.

== Eponym ==
Battersby's caecilian is named in honour of James Clarence Battersby (1901–1993), herpetologist at the British Museum (Natural History), London, for 45 years.
