= Indotyphlus =

Scientific classification
- Kingdom: Animalia
- Phylum: Chordata
- Class: Amphibia
- Order: Gymnophiona
- Clade: Apoda
- Family: Grandisoniidae
- Genus: Indotyphlus; Taylor, 1960

Type species
- Indotyphlus battersbyi Taylor, 1960

Species
- 2 species (see text)

Genus of amphibians

Indotyphlus is a small genus of caecilians in the family Grandisoniidae. As caecilians in general, they superficially resemble earthworms. The genus is endemic to the Western Ghats, India. They are sometimes known as Battersby's caecilians.

== Description ==
Indotyphlus are small caecilians, with the largest specimen (a female Indotyphlus battersbyi) measuring 24 cm (9.4 in) in total length. The eyes are visible in sockets, instead of under bone. Other diagnostic characters are absence of temporal fossae, mesethmoid not being exposed dorsally, presence of splenial teeth, secondary grooves, and scales, tentacular opening that is closer to the eye than to the external nostril, no unsegmented terminal shield, smallish narial plugs on tongue, absence of diastema between vomerine and palatine teeth, and absence of terminal keel.

Development is probably direct, without aquatic larvae.

== Habitat ==
The genus is unusual among caecilians in that both species have been recorded from relatively open, shallow-soiled areas with long dry season.

== Species ==
The genus contains two species:

Binomial name and author	Common name
Indotyphlus battersbyi Taylor, 1960	Battersby's caecilian
Indotyphlus maharashtraensis Giri, Wilkinson, and Gower, 2004	Humbarli caecilian, Maharashtra caecilian
