= Gegeneophis seshachari =

Conservation status
- Data Deficient (IUCN 3.1)

Scientific classification
- Kingdom: Animalia
- Phylum: Chordata
- Class: Amphibia
- Order: Gymnophiona
- Clade: Apoda
- Family: Grandisoniidae
- Genus: Gegeneophis
- Species: G. seshachari

Binomial name
- Gegeneophis seshachari Ravichandran, Gower, and Wilkinson, 2003

Species of amphibian

Gegeneophis seshachari, the Seshachari's caecilian, is a species of caecilian found in the Western Ghats of India. It is only known from its type locality Dorle village, Ratnagiri district in Maharashtra.
