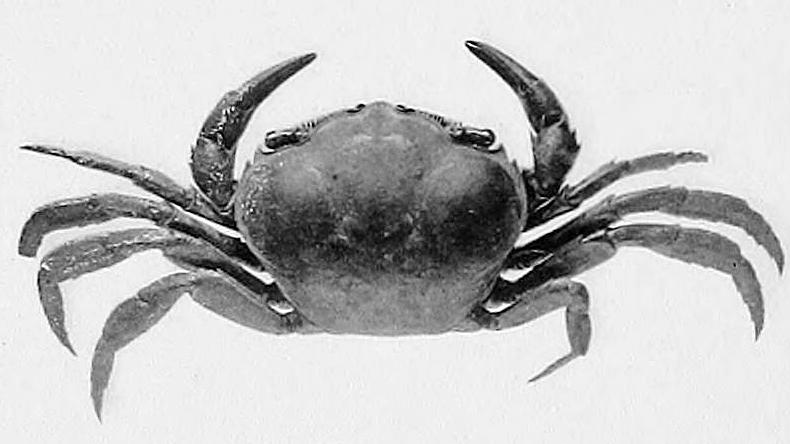

Conservation status
- Least Concern (IUCN 3.1)

Scientific classification
- Kingdom: Animalia
- Phylum: Arthropoda
- Clade: Pancrustacea
- Class: Malacostraca
- Order: Decapoda
- Suborder: Pleocyemata
- Infraorder: Brachyura
- Family: Deckeniidae
- Genus: Deckenia
- Species: D. imitatrix

Binomial name
- Deckenia imitatrix Hilgendorf, 1869

= Deckenia imitatrix =

Species of crab

Deckenia imitatrix is a species of crustacean in the family Deckeniidae. It is found in the coastal plains between Kenya and Somalia. It is threatened by habitat loss, and is listed as Near Threatened on the IUCN Red List.
