= List of national parks of Seychelles =

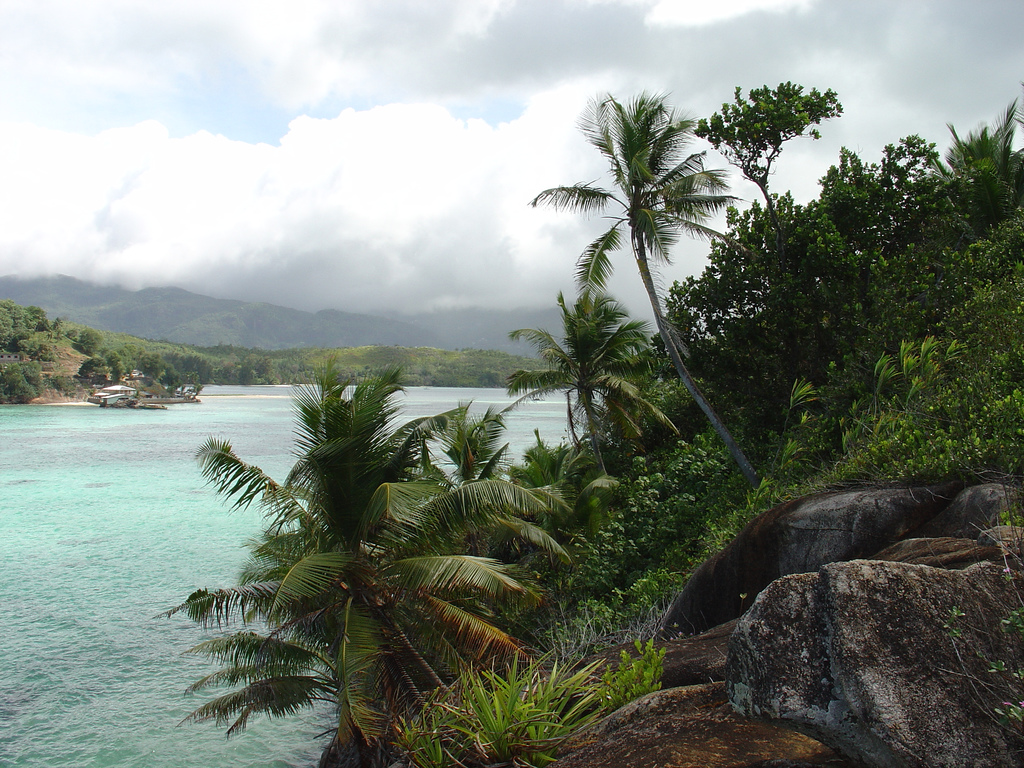
Moyenne Island in Ste Anne Marine National Park

There are three terrestrial national parks and six marine national parks in the Seychelles. The parks are administered by Seychelles National Environment Commission (SNEC), which falls under the Department of the Environment.

== National parks ==
=== Terrestrial ===
- Morne Seychellois National Park
- Praslin National Park
- Ramos National Park
- Ile Du Sud - Poivre Atoll National Park

=== Marine ===
- Baie Ternay Marine National Park
- Curieuse Marine National Park
- Ile Coco Marine National Park
- Port Launay Marine National Park
- Silhouette Island Marine National Park
- Ste Anne Marine National Park

== See also ==
- List of national parks
