= Rubricacaecilia =

Rubricacaecilia Temporal range: 145.0–139.8 Ma Berriasian
- Schematic of the jaw

Scientific classification
- Kingdom: Animalia
- Phylum: Chordata
- Class: Amphibia
- Order: Gymnophiona
- Genus: †Rubricacaecilia; Evans and Sigogneau-Russell, 2001
- Species: †R. monbaroni

Binomial name
- †Rubricacaecilia monbaroni Evans and Sigogneau-Russell, 2001

Extinct genus of caecilians

Rubricacaecilia ("Red Earth Caecilian") is an extinct genus of caecilian (limbless amphibian) from the Berriasian aged Ksar Metlili Formation in Morocco. The genus contains a single species, Rubricacaecilia monbaroni, Named for geologist M. monbaron. It is known from a nearly complete pseudodentary bone, several fragmentary pseudodentaries, a partial pseudangular, a partial palatine, an atlas, and vertebrae.

Based on the available material, Rubricacaecilia is estimated to have been relatively small, only around 200mm in length. Its morphology is intermediate between older extinct caecilians like Eocaecilia and extant caecilians. The lower jaw of Rubricacaecilia contains 28 teeth on each side, more than most extant caecilians but fewer than Eocaecilia. The shape of the teeth themselves resemble early caecilians and extant frogs in that they are small and narrow compared to living caecilians. The structure of the mandible more closely resembles Eocaecilia than it does living caecilians. Rubricacaecilia has ventral crests on its vertebrae like all extant caecilians, but these are absent in Eocaecilia.

The Ksar Metili Formation is thought to have been a coastal, brackish environment.
