= Mineral industry of Seychelles =

The mineral industry of Seychelles consists mostly of production of such materials as clay, coral, sand, and stone. Seychelles is not a globally significant mineral producer or consumer. In 2006, imports of mineral fuels accounted for about 27% of the value of total imports. That same year, Seychelles was estimated to produce about 210,000 metric tons per year (t/yr) of gravel and crushed stone, 93,000 t/yr of granite, and 8,100 t/yr of sand.

The main commercial producers of these construction materials are Civil Construction Company Ltd., Gondwana Granite, and United Concrete Products (Seychelles) Ltd.; which are all privately owned.
