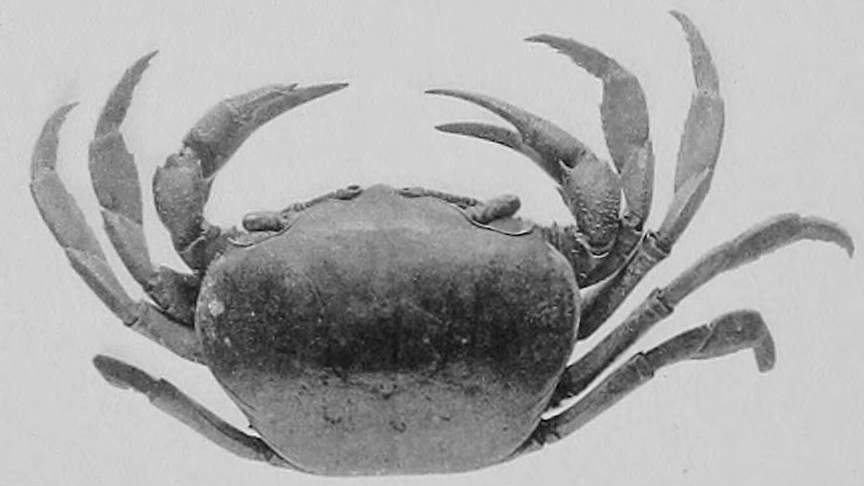

Conservation status
- Near Threatened (IUCN 3.1)

Scientific classification
- Kingdom: Animalia
- Phylum: Arthropoda
- Clade: Pancrustacea
- Class: Malacostraca
- Order: Decapoda
- Suborder: Pleocyemata
- Infraorder: Brachyura
- Family: Deckeniidae
- Genus: Deckenia
- Species: D. mitis

Binomial name
- Deckenia mitis Hilgendorf, 1898

= Deckenia mitis =

Species of crab

Deckenia mitis is a species of crustacean in the family Deckeniidae. It is found in a few places in Kenya, and more widely in Tanzania from the eastern coastal lowlands to the western Wembere Steppe, and south to near Lake Malawi. It is threatened by habitat loss, and is listed as Near Threatened on the IUCN Red List.
