= Gegeneophis primus =

Conservation status
- Data Deficient (IUCN 3.1)

Scientific classification
- Kingdom: Animalia
- Phylum: Chordata
- Class: Amphibia
- Order: Gymnophiona
- Clade: Apoda
- Family: Grandisoniidae
- Genus: Gegeneophis
- Species: G. primus

Binomial name
- Gegeneophis primus Kotharambath, Gower, Oommen & Wilkinson, 2012

Species of amphibian

Gegeneophis primus, commonly known as the Malabar Cardamom Caecilian or Sugandhagiri Blind Caecilian, is a species of caecilian, a group of limbless amphibians, in the family Grandisoniidae. It is endemic to the Western Ghats of India and is currently known only from Sugandhagiri Cardamom Estate near Vythiri in Wayanad district, Kerala.

== Taxonomy & Etymology ==
Gegeneophis primus was described by R. Kotharambath, D. J. Gower, O. V. Oommen and Mark Wilkinson in 2012 in the journal Zootaxa. It was described from eight specimens collected at Sugandhagiri Cardamom Estate in Wayanad, Kerala.

The genus Gegeneophis comprises fossorial caecilians distributed primarily in India and neighbouring parts of South Asia. The species is placed in the family Grandisoniidae, which has also been treated in earlier classifications under Indotyphlidae.

The specific name primus is Latin for "first". It refers to the species' possession of primary annular grooves without secondary grooves, a feature that distinguishes it from most other species of Gegeneophis.

== Habitat ==
Gegeneophis primus is known only from Sugandhagiri Cardamom Estate near Vythiri in Wayanad district, Kerala, at an elevation of about 850 m in the Western Ghats. It has been found in moist, loose soil along a small stream, beneath leaf litter and vegetation in shaded areas of evergreen forest and cardamom plantations.

The species appears to favour damp, shaded soils associated with streams and other sources of persistent moisture. Its restricted habitat may leave it vulnerable to deforestation, changes in land use, drainage alteration and intensive agricultural practices.

== Morphology ==
Gegeneophis primus is a slender, elongated and limbless amphibian adapted to a fossorial lifestyle. Adults measure approximately 168–180 mm in total length. The body is generally pale pink and has a smooth appearance.

The head is relatively small and bluntly pointed. The mouth is positioned somewhat behind the tip of the snout, while the eyes are extremely small and covered by skin or bone. As in other species of Gegeneophis, a pair of sensory tentacles is situated between the eyes and nostrils.

The body bears numerous primary annular grooves, producing a segmented or ringed appearance. Secondary annular grooves are completely absent. Dermal scales are also absent. The tail is short and blunt, and the terminal shield is poorly developed.

The combination of a small size, pink coloration, absence of secondary annuli and absence of scales separates G. primus from most other members of its genus. In appearance, it can be mistaken for a large earthworm. Biologist Jashandeep Shostak, who has studied the species, described it as a "small, pink, worm-like amphibian".

== Behaviour ==
Like other caecilians, Gegeneophis primus is fossorial and spends most of its life beneath the soil surface. Its morphology is adapted for burrowing, and it is rarely encountered above ground. It is presumed to be primarily active in moist conditions, particularly following rainfall.

== Diet ==
The diet of Gegeneophis primus has not been directly studied in detail. As with other members of the genus, it is believed to feed on small soil-dwelling invertebrates. Likely prey include earthworms, insect larvae, termites, ants and other small arthropods.
