= Sylvacaecilia =

Conservation status
- Least Concern (IUCN 3.1)

Scientific classification
- Kingdom: Animalia
- Phylum: Chordata
- Class: Amphibia
- Order: Gymnophiona
- Clade: Apoda
- Family: Grandisoniidae
- Genus: Sylvacaecilia; Wake, 1987
- Species: S. grandisonae

Binomial name
- Sylvacaecilia grandisonae (Taylor, 1970)

Synonyms
- Geotrypetes grandisonae Taylor, 1970

Genus of amphibians

Sylvacaecilia is a monotypic genus of caecilian in the family Grandisoniidae. The only species is Sylvacaecilia grandisonae, also known as the Aleku caecilian or Ethiopian caecilian. It is endemic to southwestern Ethiopia and known from the Gambela, Oromia, and Southern Nations, Nationalities, and Peoples' Regions.

== Taxonomy ==
Sylvacaecilia grandisonae was described by Edward Harrison Taylor in 1970 as Geotrypetes grandisonae, although he noted that the generic assignment was provisional. Because of significant differences in morphology and life history in comparison to other Geotrypetes species, it was moved to its own, monotypic genus Sylvacaecilia by Marvalee Wake in 1987.

== Etymology ==
The generic name Sylvacaecilia is derived from Greek sylva, referring to the forest habitat of these animals, and Latin caecilia, in reference to the taxon. The specific name grandisonae honours Miss Alice G. C. Grandison, a Curator of Herpetology at Natural History Museum, London and whom Taylor acknowledges as having been "helpful in providing these specimens for study".

== Description ==
Sylvacaecilia grandisonae was described based on two specimens, the female holotype measuring 259 mm (10.2 in) in total length, and the male paratype measuring 231 mm (9.1 in) in total length. The body is relatively thick, with body width in length approximately 24 times.

Sylvacaecilia grandisonae has free-living larval stage.

== Habitat and conservation ==
Its natural habitats are tropical deciduous forests at elevations of 1,500–2,200 m (4,900–7,200 ft) above sea level. Adults live in soil or mud and under leaf-litter. Larvae have been found in very wet mud at the edge of a stream. No major threats are known, although habitat disturbance could still be an issue. It occurs in the Kafa Biosphere Reserve.
