= Gegeneophis krishni =

Conservation status
- Data Deficient (IUCN 3.1)

Scientific classification
- Kingdom: Animalia
- Phylum: Chordata
- Class: Amphibia
- Order: Gymnophiona
- Clade: Apoda
- Family: Grandisoniidae
- Genus: Gegeneophis
- Species: G. krishni

Binomial name
- Gegeneophis krishni Pillai & Ravichandran, 1999

Species of amphibian

Gegeneophis krishni, commonly known as the Gurupur caecilian or Gurupur blind caecilian, is a species of caecilian in the family Grandisoniidae. It was described from Krishna Farms at Gurupur in Dakshina Kannada district, Karnataka, India, and remains known from the Gurupur region.

== Taxonomy and etymology ==
Gegeneophis krishni was described by R. S. Pillai and M. S. Ravichandran in 1999 in the Records of the Zoological Survey of India, Occasional Paper 172. The holotype is ZSI-M VAG 32, collected at "Krishna Farms, Gurpur, Karnataka".

The The specific epithet krishni is supposedly derived from Krishna Farms, the locality in Gurupur, Karnataka, from which the species was described, although the original description does not explicitly state the derivation of the name. The species is included in the genus Gegeneophis, a group of predominantly subterranean caecilians occurring in the Indian Western Ghats.

== Habitat ==
The known range of G. krishni is centred on Gurupur in coastal Karnataka. The species is associated with moist terrestrial environments, including plantation and garden habitats, where caecilians can occur within soil and organic ground material. Published records of the species include specimens from arecanut and banana plantations as well as garden and compost habitats.

Its subterranean habits make it difficult to detect, and the absence of records from other localities cannot necessarily be taken as evidence of a strictly restricted distribution. The species is nevertheless currently recorded only from the Gurupur area in major taxonomic databases.

== Morphology ==
Gegeneophis krishni is a small, slender and worm-like caecilian. An adult may reach approximately 195 mm in length, with a body width of about 3.5 mm.

The head is approximately as wide as the body and has a blunt snout. The eyes are not externally visible. A sensory tentacle is positioned slightly behind and below each nostril. The body bears numerous primary and secondary annular grooves, with recent comparative work recording 125–127 primary annuli and secondary grooves beginning between approximately the 110th and 114th annuli.

The dorsal surface is brownish with a steel-blue tint, while the head is somewhat paler. The posterior part of the body is darker, and the underside is brownish with a pale circular area around the vent. The skin bears numerous small whitish glands, and scales occur in the anterior body folds.

Biologist Jashandeep Shostak has described the species as a particularly simple-looking caecilian, with its elongated cylindrical body and closely spaced annuli forming its most conspicuous external characteristics.

== Behaviour ==
Gegeneophis krishni is a fossorial amphibian and spends much of its life below the soil surface. Individuals are consequently infrequently encountered, and relatively little is known about their activity patterns or social behaviour.

Surface appearances are associated with wet conditions in available accounts. Detailed information concerning reproduction, territoriality and communication is lacking.

== Diet ==
The feeding biology of G. krishni has not been studied in detail. Like other caecilians, it is considered a predator of small soil-dwelling animals. Earthworms and other soft-bodied invertebrates are plausible prey.
