= Makumuno Assumbo caecilian =

Conservation status
- Data Deficient (IUCN 3.1)

Scientific classification
- Kingdom: Animalia
- Phylum: Chordata
- Class: Amphibia
- Order: Gymnophiona
- Clade: Apoda
- Family: Grandisoniidae
- Genus: Idiocranium; Parker, 1936
- Species: I. russeli

Binomial name
- Idiocranium russeli Parker, 1936

Species of amphibian

The Makumunu Assumbo caecilian (Idiocranium russeli) is a species of African caecilian in the family Grandisoniidae. It is one of the smallest of caecilians, and is found in Cameroon. It is monotypic in the genus Idiocranium.
