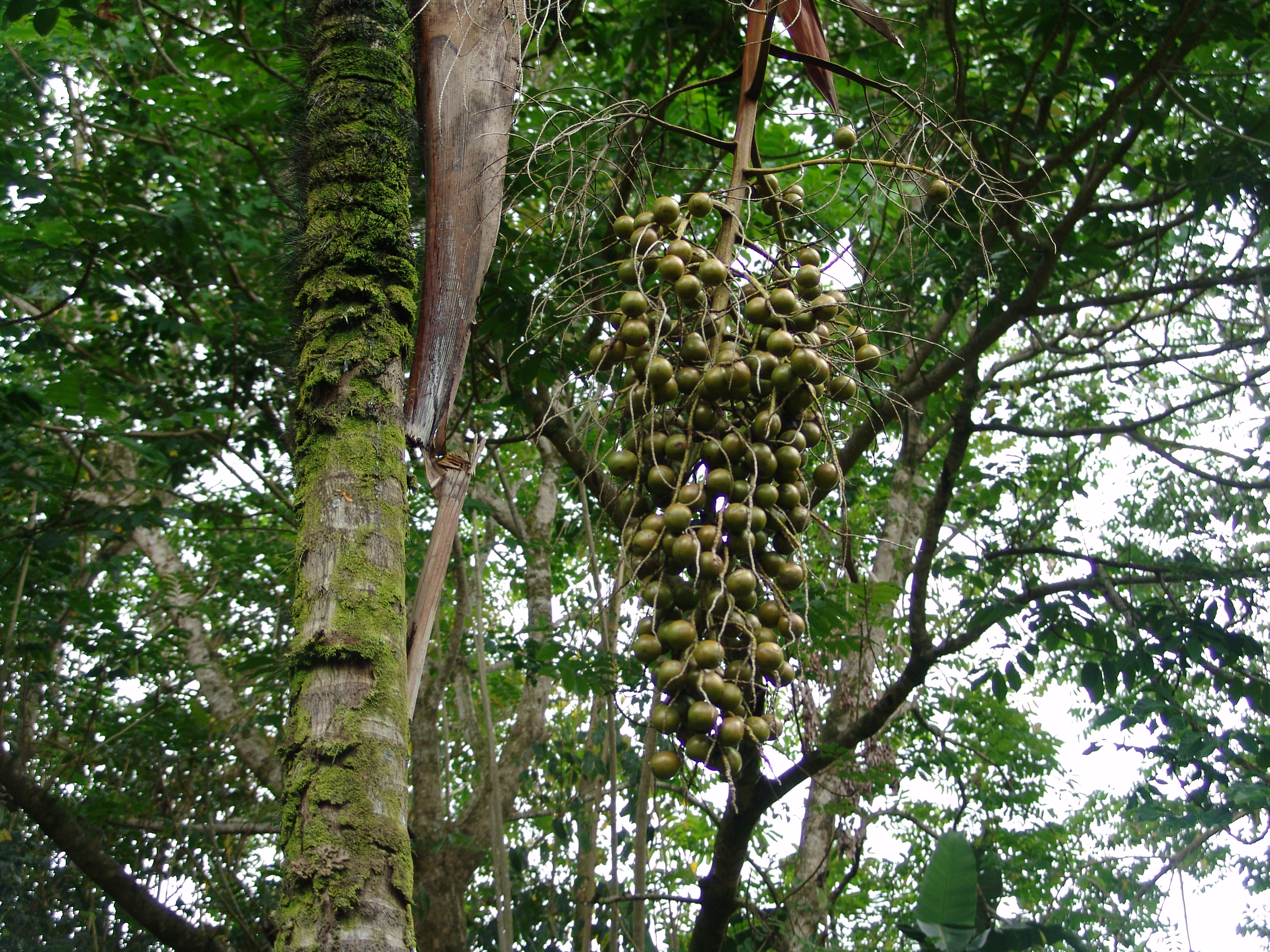
- Verschaffeltia splendida

Scientific classification
- Kingdom: Plantae
- Clade: Tracheophytes
- Clade: Angiosperms
- Clade: Monocots
- Clade: Commelinids
- Order: Arecales
- Family: Arecaceae
- Tribe: Areceae
- Subtribe: Verschaffeltiinae; J. Dransf., N.W. Uhl, Asmussen, W.J. Baker, M.M.Harley & C.E. Lewis

= Verschaffeltiinae =

Subtribe of palms

Verschaffeltiinae is a subtribe of plants in the family Arecaceae endemic to the Seychelles.

Genera in the subtribe, all of which are monotypic, are:

- Nephrosperma
- Phoenicophorium
- Roscheria
- Verschaffeltia
