= Gegeneophis goaensis =

Conservation status
- Data Deficient (IUCN 3.1)

Scientific classification
- Kingdom: Animalia
- Phylum: Chordata
- Class: Amphibia
- Order: Gymnophiona
- Clade: Apoda
- Family: Grandisoniidae
- Genus: Gegeneophis
- Species: G. goaensis

Binomial name
- Gegeneophis goaensis Bhatta et al., 2007

Species of amphibian

Gegeneophis goaensis, also known as the Goa caecilian, is a species of caecilian known from its type locality in Keri Village, Sattari Taluk, in the North Goa district of Goa, India.

== Ecology and biology ==
Gegeneophis goaensis lives at 32–42 meters above sea level. The first three known specimens were collected from vegetation rotting in small streams. The species is said to be clearly able to "adapt to certain anthropogenic habitats;" its original natural habitat remains unknown. The reproductive cycle of the Goa caecilian is assumed to be no different than the one of other members of its genus.
