= Globonautes =

Conservation status
- Endangered (IUCN 3.1)

Scientific classification
- Kingdom: Animalia
- Phylum: Arthropoda
- Clade: Pancrustacea
- Class: Malacostraca
- Order: Decapoda
- Suborder: Pleocyemata
- Infraorder: Brachyura
- Family: Deckeniidae
- Genus: Globonautes; Bott, 1959
- Species: G. macropus

Binomial name
- Globonautes macropus (Rathbun, 1898)

Synonyms
- Potamon (Geothelphusa) macropus Rathbun, 1898

Genus of crabs

Globonautes macropus is a species of crab in the family Potamonautidae, the only species in the genus Globonautes. It is found in Guinea and Liberia and presumably in Sierra Leone, and is listed as an endangered species on the IUCN Red List. It lives in tree hollows filled with water, in closed-canopy rainforest.

== Habitat ==
Globonautes macropus, inhabits rain filled crevices of trees in the areas of West Africa, specifically in Liberia and Guinea and possibly Sierra Leone.
