= Gegeneophis =

Scientific classification
- Kingdom: Animalia
- Phylum: Chordata
- Class: Amphibia
- Order: Gymnophiona
- Clade: Apoda
- Family: Grandisoniidae
- Genus: Gegeneophis; Peters, 1880

Species
- 12 species (see text)

Synonyms
- Gegenes Günther, 1876 "1875"

Genus of amphibians

Gegeneophis is a genus of amphibians in the family Grandisoniidae. They are found in southern and northeastern India.

== Species ==
There are 12 species:

- Gegeneophis carnosus (Beddome, 1870) — Periya Peak caecilian, blind caecilian, pink blind caecilian
- Gegeneophis danieli Giri, Wilkinson, and Gower, 2003
- Gegeneophis goaensis Bhatta, Dinesh, Prashanth, and Kulkarni, 2007
- Gegeneophis krishni Pillai and Ravichandran, 1999
- Gegeneophis madhavai Bhatta and Srinivasa, 2004
- Gegeneophis mhadeiensis Bhatta, Dinesh, Prashanth, and Kulkarni, 2007
- Gegeneophis orientalis Agarwal, Wilkinson, Mohapatra, Dutta, Giri, and Gower, 2013
- Gegeneophis pareshi Giri, Gower, Gaikwad, and Wilkinson, 2011
- Gegeneophis primus Kotharambath, Gower, Oommen, and Wilkinson, 2012
- Gegeneophis ramaswamii Taylor, 1964 — Tenmalai caecilian, Ramaswami's caecilian
- Gegeneophis seshachari Ravichandran, Gower, and Wilkinson, 2003
- Gegeneophis tejaswini Kotharambath, Wilkinson, Oommen, and Gower, 2015
