= Gegeneophis danieli =

Conservation status
- Data Deficient (IUCN 3.1)

Scientific classification
- Kingdom: Animalia
- Phylum: Chordata
- Class: Amphibia
- Order: Gymnophiona
- Clade: Apoda
- Family: Grandisoniidae
- Genus: Gegeneophis
- Species: G. danieli

Binomial name
- Gegeneophis danieli Giri, Wilkinson, and Gower, 2003

Synonyms
- Gegeneophis nadkarnii Bhatta and Prashanth, 2004

Species of amphibian

Gegeneophis danieli, the Amboli caecilian or Daniel's caecilian, is a species of caecilians in the family Indotyphlidae. It was discovered from near Amboli in Western Ghats of Maharashtra.
