= Gegeneophis carnosus =

Conservation status
- Data Deficient (IUCN 3.1)

Scientific classification
- Kingdom: Animalia
- Phylum: Chordata
- Class: Amphibia
- Order: Gymnophiona
- Clade: Apoda
- Family: Grandisoniidae
- Genus: Gegeneophis
- Species: G. carnosus

Binomial name
- Gegeneophis carnosus (Beddome, 1870)

Synonyms
- Epicrium carnosum Beddome, 1870; Gegenes carnosus (Beddome, 1870)

Species of amphibian

Gegeneophis carnosus is a species of caecilian found in Karnataka and Kerala states, India. Its common name Periah Peak caecilian refers to its type locality (Periya Peak, Wayanad, Kerala), though it is also known under names blind caecilian and pink blind caecilian.

Gegeneophis carnosus is a rather small species of caecilian with a flesh-coloured body. The body ends in a blunt shield; the eyes are not visible externally. The tentacular apertures are below and behind the nostrils, which are placed close to the tip of the snout, so that they are not quite visible from top. It is thought to be distributed in the hills of Kerala and Karnataka in India.
