= Indotyphlus maharashtraensis =

Conservation status
- Data Deficient (IUCN 3.1)

Scientific classification
- Kingdom: Animalia
- Phylum: Chordata
- Class: Amphibia
- Order: Gymnophiona
- Clade: Apoda
- Family: Grandisoniidae
- Genus: Indotyphlus
- Species: I. maharashtraensis

Binomial name
- Indotyphlus maharashtraensis Giri, Wilkinson, and Gower, 2004

Species of amphibian

Indotyphlus maharashtraensis is a species of caecilians described in 2004 by scientists of Bombay Natural History Society and the Natural History Museum, London. It is only the second species of Indotyphlus known to science, and only known from its type locality near Humbarli village, Satara District, in the Western Ghats of Maharashtra, India. Common names Humbarli caecilian, Maharashtra caecilian, and Konkan tail-less caecilian have been coined for it.

== Description ==
The type series consists of 12 specimens, including three males measuring 78–205 mm (3.1–8.1 in) and seven females measuring 100–197 mm (3.9–7.8 in) in total length; two smaller specimens could not be reliably sexed. The mid-body width of the larger specimens is about 4–5 mm (0.16–0.20 in). The body is subcylindrical, slightly dorsoventrally compressed. The eyes are visible through the skin and appear as small dark spots. The tentacles are short, globular, and closer to the eye than the nostril. There are 124–133 primary annuli. The body has mostly brownish dorsal ground colour, becoming more grey/lavender posteriorly and paler laterally and ventrally. Granular glands appear as white flecks scattered over much of the body; their alignment with the annular grooves makes the grooves conspicuous, more so posteriorly.

== Habitat and conservation ==
The type series was collected from under rocks in open, grassy, shallow-soiled plateau at about 1,040 m (3,410 ft) above sea level. The specimens were collected during the monsoon season. How these caecilians spend the long dry season is unknown but might involve aestivation.

Threats to this still little known species are unknown. It is not known to occur in any protected area.
