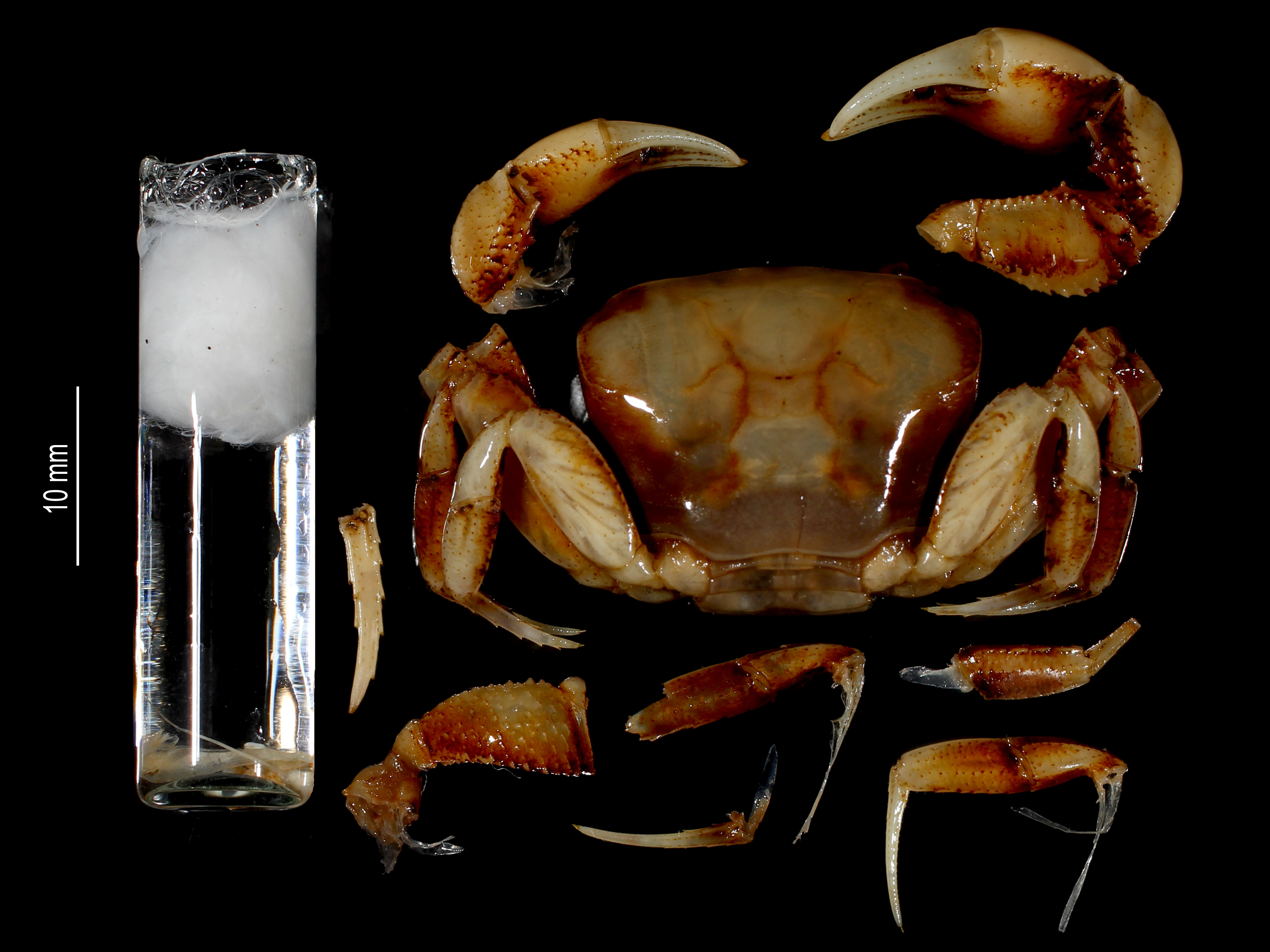
- Afrithelphusa monodosa

Scientific classification
- Kingdom: Animalia
- Phylum: Arthropoda
- Clade: Pancrustacea
- Class: Malacostraca
- Order: Decapoda
- Suborder: Pleocyemata
- Infraorder: Brachyura
- Family: Deckeniidae
- Subfamily: Deckeniinae
- Genus: Afrithelphusa; Bott, 1969

Type species
- Afrithelphusa gerhildae Bott, 1969

= Afrithelphusa =

Genus of crabs

Afrithelphusa is a genus of freshwater crabs in the family Deckeniidae. It contains four species, all of which were formerly listed as critically endangered by the International Union for Conservation of Nature (IUCN). They are all endemic to the Upper Guinean forests of Guinea and Sierra Leone.

== Afrithelphusa afzelii ==
Afrithelphusa afzelii (Colosi, 1924) is known from two specimens collected in 1796 from a single, unknown locality in Sierra Leone. It is considered possibly extinct. In 2021, the species was rediscovered in Moyamba District by Pierre A. Mvogo Ndongo, a researcher from the University of Douala.

== Afrithelphusa gerhildae ==
Afrithelphusa gerhildae (Bott, 1969) is known from three specimens collected in 1957 in Kindia, Guinea. Although population sizes are not known, the expansion of slash-and-burn agriculture and deforestation are likely to have caused it to decline. The lack of information about this species has led to its reappraisal as Data Deficient.

== Afrithelphusa leonensis ==
Afrithelphusa leonensis (Cumberlidge, 1987) is known from three specimens collected in 1955 at one locality in Guinea. It is considered critically endangered. The crab was among the 25 "lost species" in the "Search for Lost Species" program by the non-profit organization Global Wildlife Conservation (GWC). As part of this search, in 2021 the species was also rediscovered, this time on Sugar Loaf Mountain, just south of Freetown again by Pierre A. Mvogo Ndongo, just four days after rediscovering A. afzelii.

== Afrithelphusa monodosa ==
Afrithelphusa monodosa (Bott, 1959), the purple marsh crab, is the best known of the four species, new populations having been discovered since 1996. Despite this, fewer than 20 specimens have been collected, and the total population is likely to be less than 2,500. This crab is now listed as endangered.
