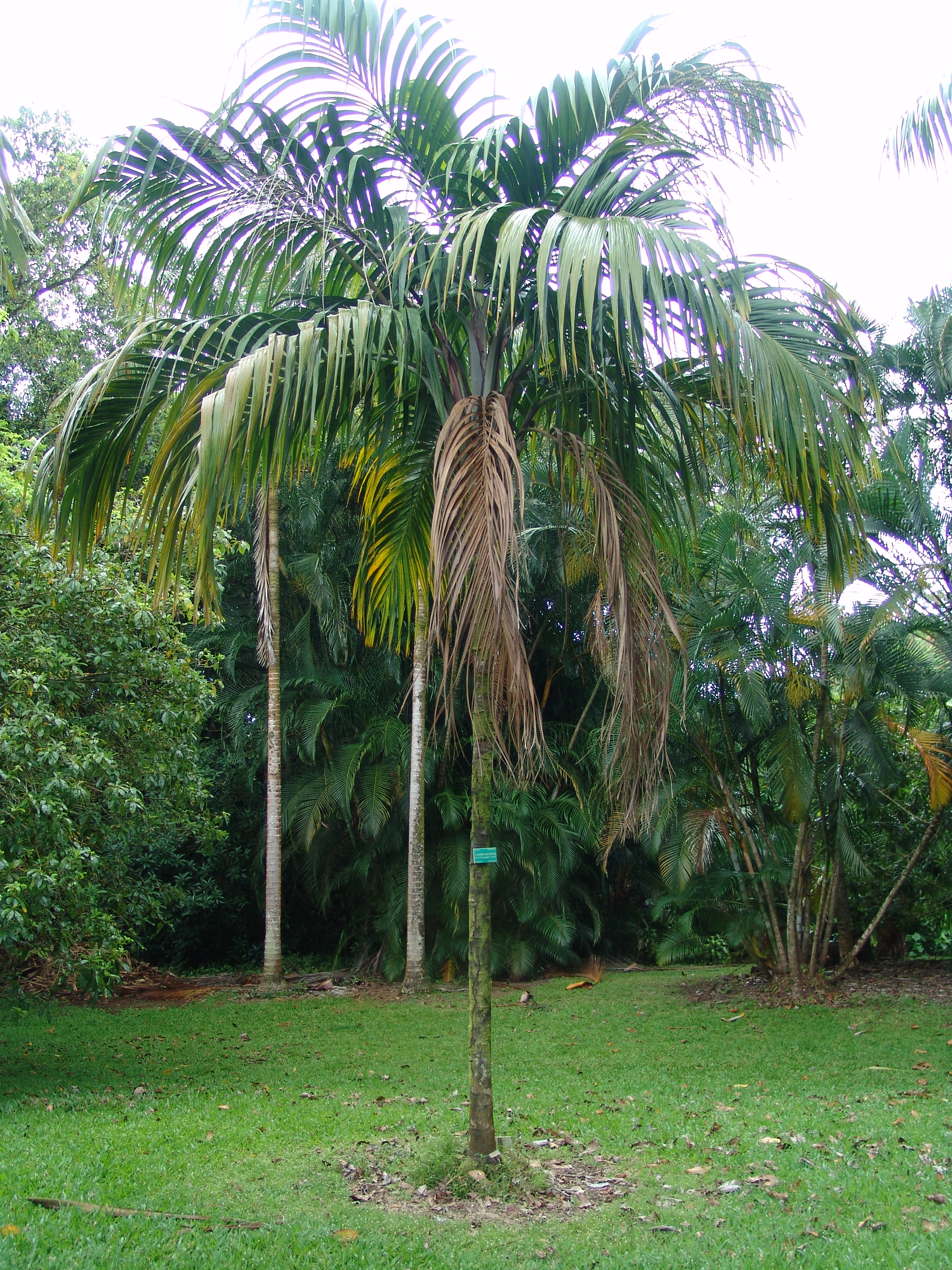

Conservation status
- Least Concern (IUCN 3.1)

Scientific classification
- Kingdom: Plantae
- Clade: Tracheophytes
- Clade: Angiosperms
- Clade: Monocots
- Clade: Commelinids
- Order: Arecales
- Family: Arecaceae
- Subfamily: Arecoideae
- Tribe: Areceae
- Subtribe: Verschaffeltiinae
- Genus: Nephrosperma; Balf.f.
- Species: N. vanhoutteanum

Binomial name
- Nephrosperma vanhoutteanum (H.Wendl. ex Van Houtte) Balf.f.

Synonyms
- Oncosperma vanhoutteanum H.Wendl. ex Van Houtte; Areca nobilis auct.

= Nephrosperma =

Species of plant

Nephrosperma vanhoutteanum is a species of palm tree, and the only species in the genus Nephrosperma. It is found only in Seychelles, where it is threatened by habitat loss.
