= Chorla =

Coordinates: 15°40′N 74°09′E

- Village
- Interactive map of Chorla
- Country: India
- State: Karnataka
- District: Belgaum
- Talukas: Khanapur

Languages
  - Official: Kannada, Konkani
- Time zone: UTC+5:30 (IST)
- Postal code: 591345

Chorla is a village in Belgaum district in the state of Karnataka, India.
