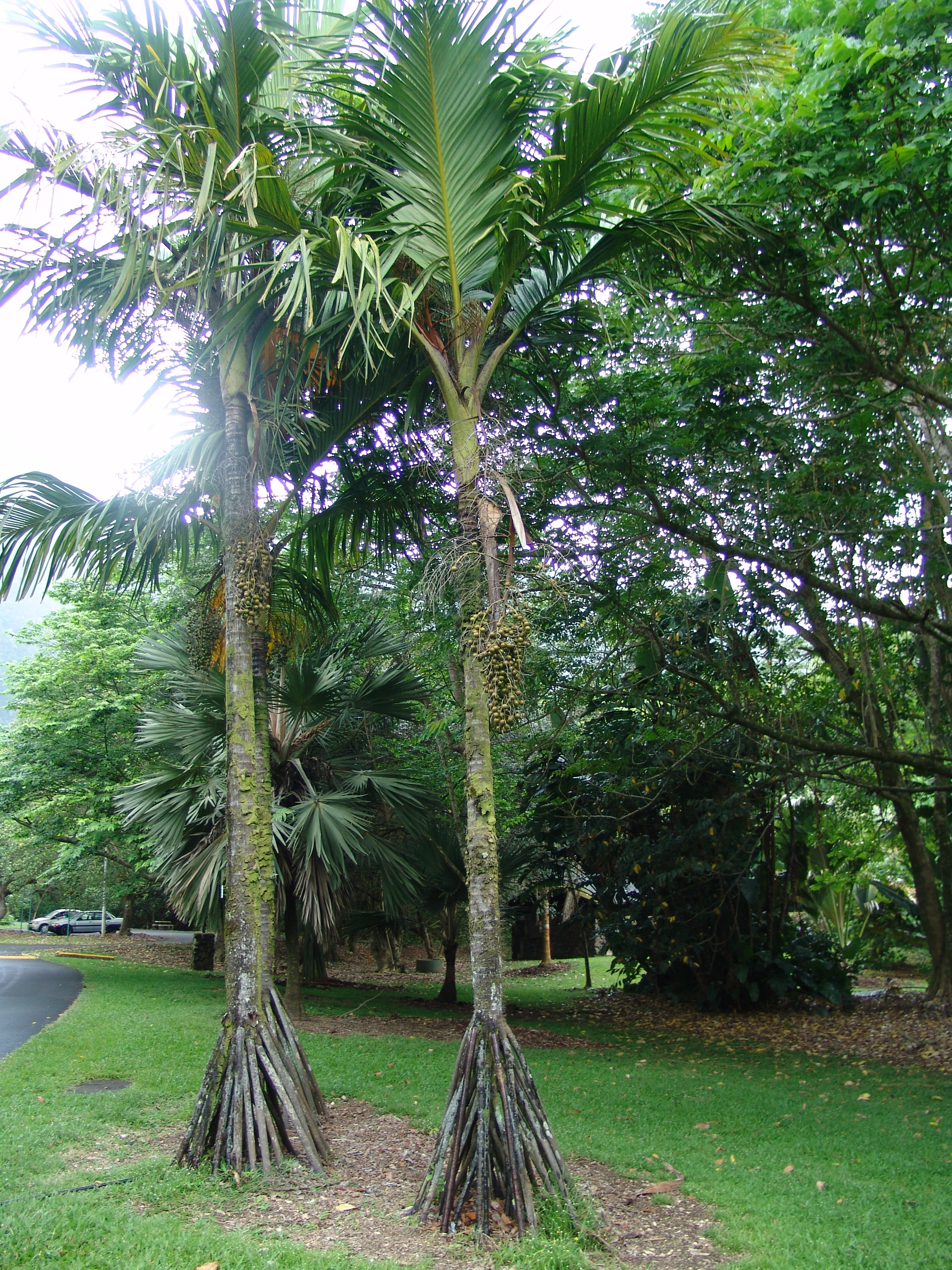

Conservation status
- Near Threatened (IUCN 3.1)

Scientific classification
- Kingdom: Plantae
- Clade: Tracheophytes
- Clade: Angiosperms
- Clade: Monocots
- Clade: Commelinids
- Order: Arecales
- Family: Arecaceae
- Subfamily: Arecoideae
- Tribe: Areceae
- Subtribe: Verschaffeltiinae
- Genus: Verschaffeltia; H.Wendl.
- Species: V. splendida

Binomial name
- Verschaffeltia splendida H.A. Wendl.

= Verschaffeltia =

Genus of palms

Verschaffeltia splendida ("Latanier Latte" or stilt palm) is a species of flowering plant in the family Arecaceae. It is the only species in the genus Verschaffeltia.

It is found only in Seychelles where it is threatened by habitat loss. The name comes from the Belgian Ambroise Verschaffelt.

== Description ==
This species can be distinguished from all other palm species of the Seychelles by its characteristic stilt-roots.

The slender trunk has a very hard outer covering. The leaves are initially unbroken, and those of the young plants have black spines on their stalks. They bear green-brown fruits with unique seeds.

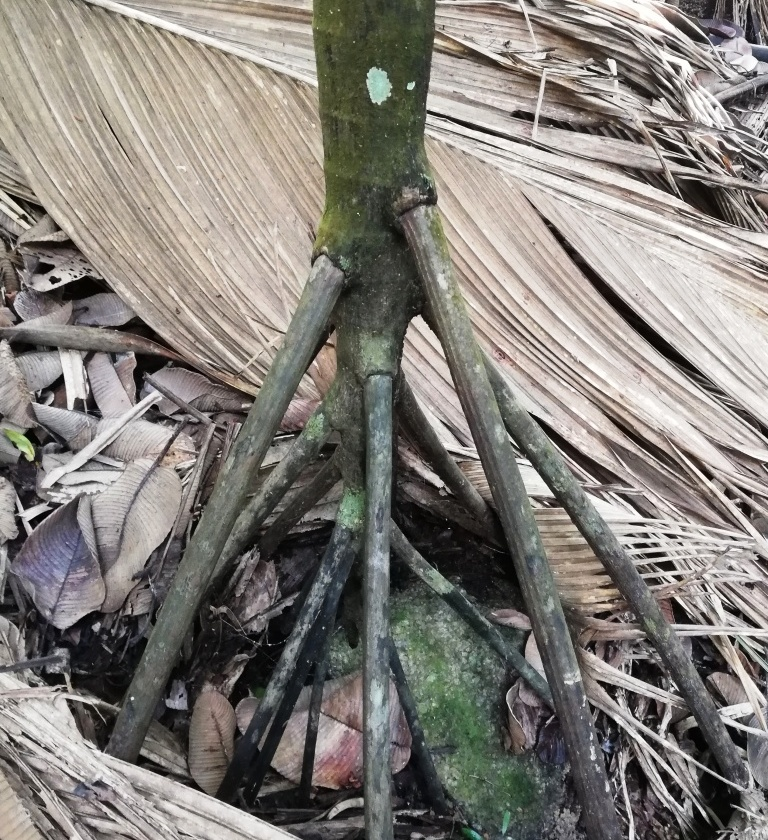
The stilt-roots of this species

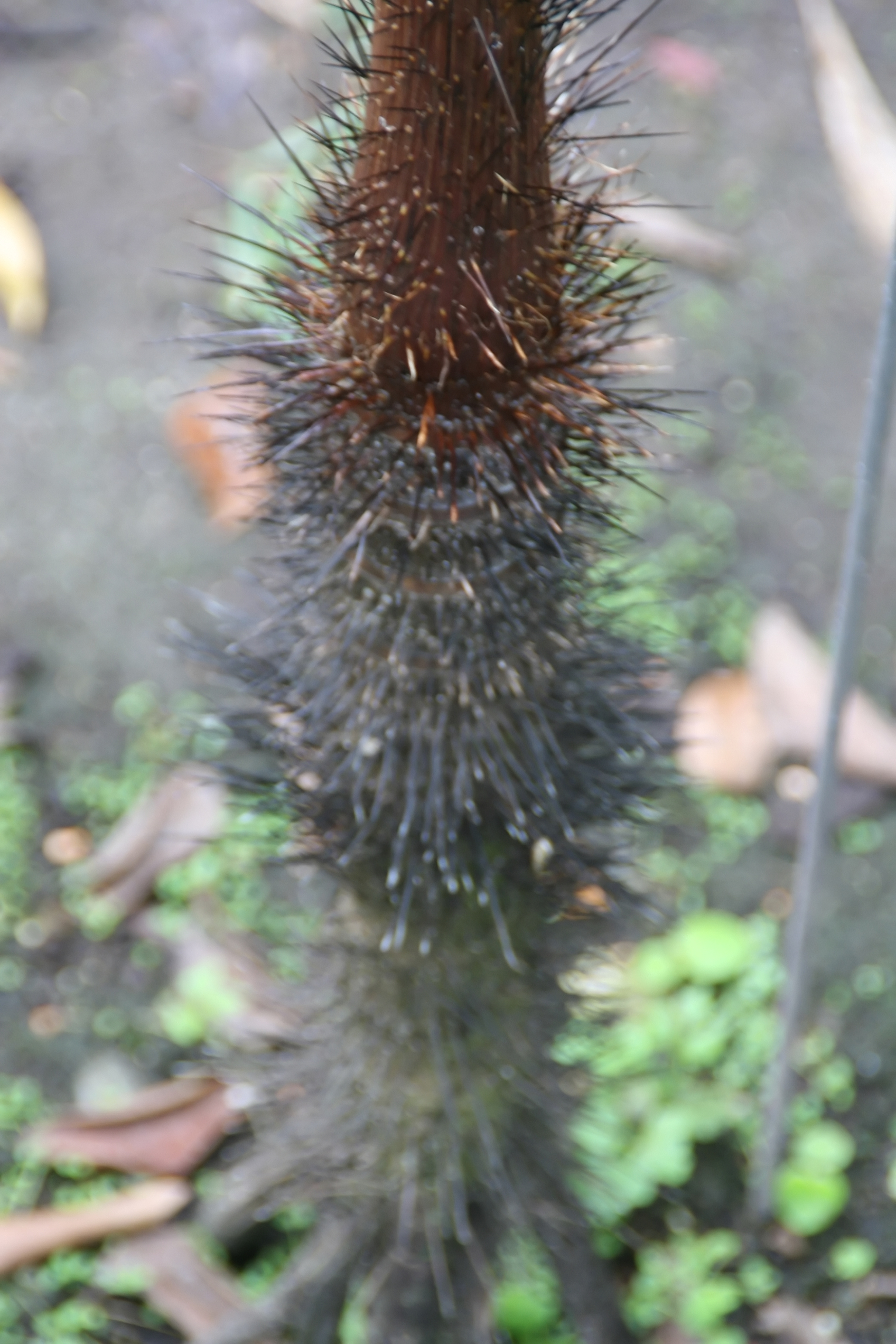
The black spines that cover the stem and leaves of young plants

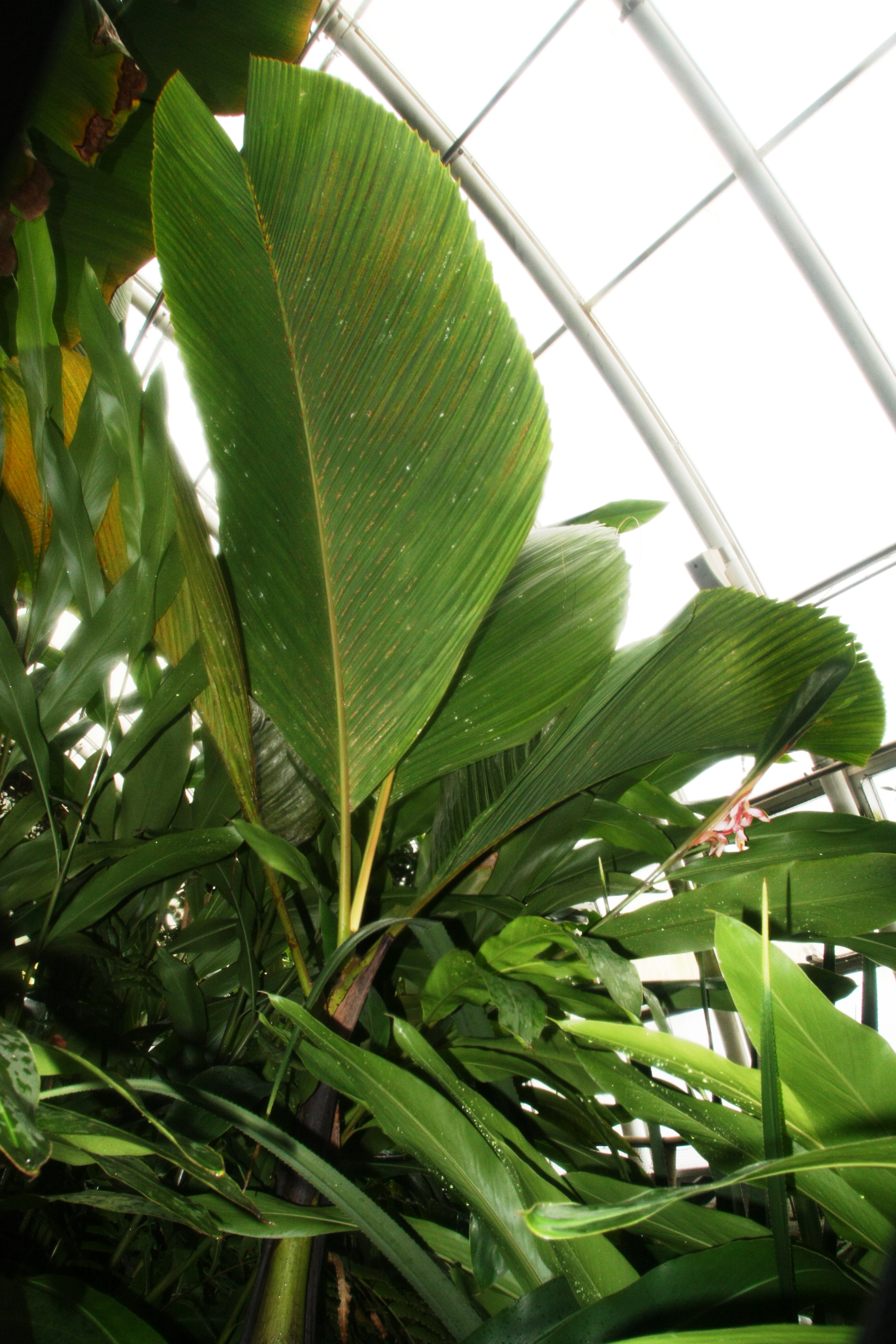
The unbroken young leaves
