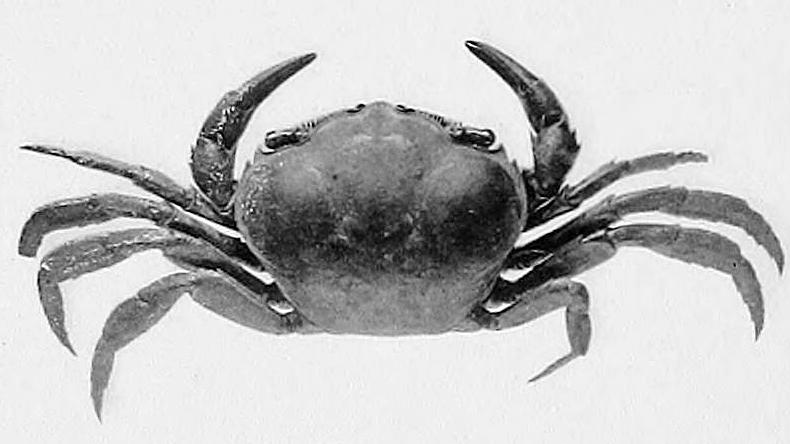
- Deckenia imitatrix

Scientific classification
- Kingdom: Animalia
- Phylum: Arthropoda
- Clade: Pancrustacea
- Class: Malacostraca
- Order: Decapoda
- Suborder: Pleocyemata
- Infraorder: Brachyura
- Family: Deckeniidae
- Subfamily: Deckeniinae
- Genus: Deckenia; Hilgendorf, 1869

Species
- Deckenia imitatrix Hilgendorf, 1869; Deckenia mitis Hilgendorf, 1898

= Deckenia (crab) =

Genus of crabs

Deckenia is a genus of freshwater crabs from East Africa, in the family Potamonautidae, or sometimes in the family Deckeniidae. The genus was named by Hilgendorf after Karl Klaus von der Decken who collected the first examples during his expeditions to Africa. Both species live in swamps from Eyl in Somalia to Dar es Salaam, Tanzania, both in coastal areas and further inland. A third species, Deckenia alluaudi, lives in the Seychelles, and has been transferred to a separate genus, Seychellum.

== Deckenia imitatrix ==
Deckenia imitatrix is found in the coastal plains between Kenya and Somalia. It is threatened by habitat loss, and is listed as Near Threatened on the IUCN Red List.

== Deckenia mitis ==
Deckenia mitis is found in a few places in Kenya, and more widely in Tanzania from the eastern coastal lowlands to the western Wembere Steppe, and south to near Lake Malawi. It is threatened by habitat loss, and is listed as Near Threatened on the IUCN Red List.
