= Ramos National Park =

National park in the Seychelles

Ile Coco National Park
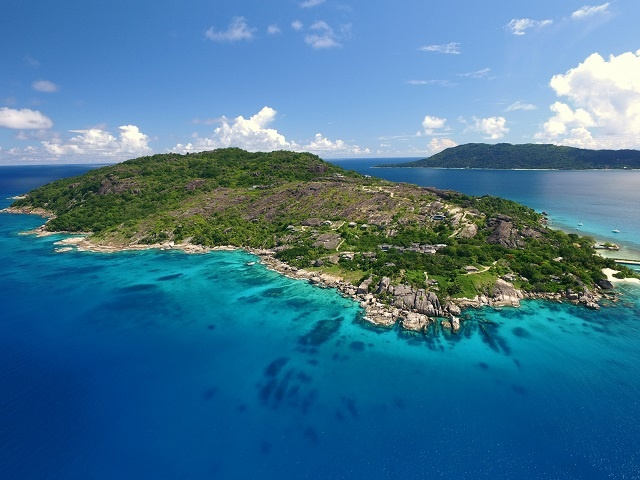
- Ile Coco Marine National , a Marine Protected Area in Seychelles archipelago
- Interactive map of Ile Coco National Park
- Location: Félicité Island, Seychelles
- Nearest city: Mahé, Seychelles
- Coordinates: 4.32°S 55.87°E
- Area: 2.68 km^{2} (1.03 sq mi)
- Governing body: Seychelles National Parks Authority

The 'Ile COco Marine National Parks lies off the island of Félicité in the Seychelles archipelago of the western Indian Ocean.

== Description ==
It is managed by Seychelles National Parks Authority since 1983, the Park's name is related to Ramos Mediterraneo.

== See also ==
- List of national parks of Seychelles
