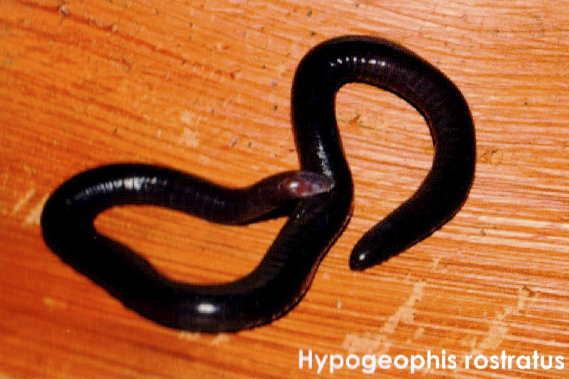

Conservation status
- Endangered (IUCN 3.1)

Scientific classification
- Kingdom: Animalia
- Phylum: Chordata
- Class: Amphibia
- Order: Gymnophiona
- Clade: Apoda
- Family: Grandisoniidae
- Genus: Hypogeophis
- Species: H. rostratus

Binomial name
- Hypogeophis rostratus (Cuvier, 1829)

Synonyms
- Coecilia rostrata Cuvier, 1829; Hypogeophis guentheri Boulenger, 1882

= Frigate Island caecilian =

Species of amphibian

The Frigate Island caecilian (Hypogeophis rostratus), also called the sharp-nosed caecilia, is a species of amphibian in the family Indotyphlidae, endemic to the Seychelles, where it is the most widespread caecilian species. It is found on all the islands with amphibians, namely Mahé, Praslin, Silhouette, Ste. Anne, Curieuse, La Digue, Cerf, and Frégate. The Frigate Island caecilian skeletal structure said to resemble the Gegeneophis ramaswamii, an Indian direct-developing caeciliid (Müller, 2006). This discovery was made after many people questioned the original statements made regarding their skeletal structure and how it develops.
