= Hypogeophis alternans =

Conservation status
- Endangered (IUCN 3.1)

Scientific classification
- Kingdom: Animalia
- Phylum: Chordata
- Class: Amphibia
- Order: Gymnophiona
- Clade: Apoda
- Family: Grandisoniidae
- Genus: Hypogeophis
- Species: H. alternans

Binomial name
- Hypogeophis alternans Stejneger, 1893

Synonyms
- Grandisonia alternans Taylor, 1968

Species of amphibian

Hypogeophis alternans, commonly called Stejneger's caecilian, is a species of caecilian in the family Indotyphlidae, endemic to the Seychelles islands of Mahé, Praslin, Frégate, and La Digue.
