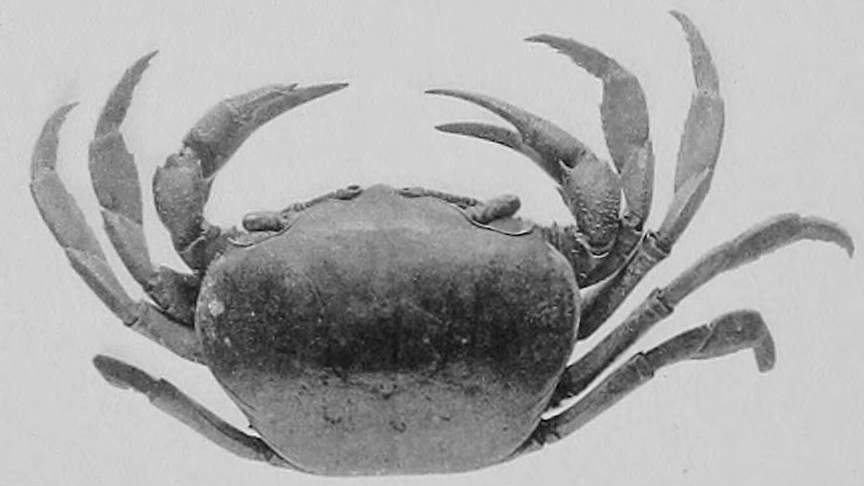
- Deckenia mitis

Scientific classification
- Kingdom: Animalia
- Phylum: Arthropoda
- Clade: Pancrustacea
- Class: Malacostraca
- Order: Decapoda
- Suborder: Pleocyemata
- Infraorder: Brachyura
- Superfamily: Potamoidea
- Family: Deckeniidae; Ortmann, 1897

= Deckeniidae =

Family of crabs

Deckeniidae is a family of freshwater crabs endemic to East Africa, including the islands of the Seychelles, and Madagascar.

It comprises the following subfamilies and genera:

Deckeniinae Ortmann, 1897
- Afrithelphusa Bott, 1969
- Deckenia Hilgendorf, 1868
- Globonautes Bott, 1959
- Seychellum Ng, Števčić & Pretzmann, 1995
Hydrothelphusinae, Colosi, 1920
- Agora Cumberlidge, Soma, Leever & Daniels, 2020
- Boreathelphusa Cumberlidge, 2010
- Crosnautes Cumberlidge, Soma, Leever, Clark & Daniels, 2021
- Dianathelphusa Cumberlidge & Daniels, 2025
- Foza Reed & Cumberlidge, 2006
- Glabrithelphusa Meyer, Cumberlidge & Koppin, 2014
- Hydrothelphusa A. Milne-Edwards, 1872
- Madagapotamon Bott, 1965
- Malagasya Cumberlidge & von Sternberg, 2002
- Marojejy Cumberlidge, Boyko & Harvey, 2002
- Nheena Cumberlidge, Soma, Leever & Daniels, 2023
- Skelosophusa Ng & Takeda, 1994
- Toamasina Leevera, Daniels, Soma & Cumberlidge, 2022
- Vahatra Leever, Daniels, Soma & Cumberlidge, 2022
- Vichai Cumberlidge, Daniels, Soma & Leever, 2023
