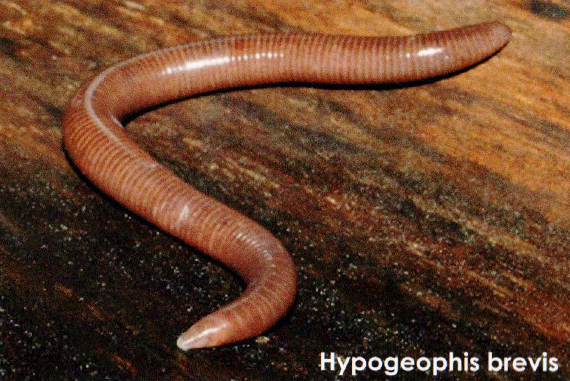

Conservation status
- Critically Endangered (IUCN 3.1)

Scientific classification
- Kingdom: Animalia
- Phylum: Chordata
- Class: Amphibia
- Order: Gymnophiona
- Clade: Apoda
- Family: Grandisoniidae
- Genus: Hypogeophis
- Species: H. brevis

Binomial name
- Hypogeophis brevis Boulenger, 1911

Synonyms
- Grandisonia brevis (Taylor, 1968)

= Hypogeophis brevis =

Species of amphibian

Hypogeophis brevis is a species of caecilian formerly included in the genus Grandisonia and found on the islands of Mahé and Silhouette in the Seychelles. It is known only from two specimens collected on Mahé in 1910 and more collected recently from Silhouette.
