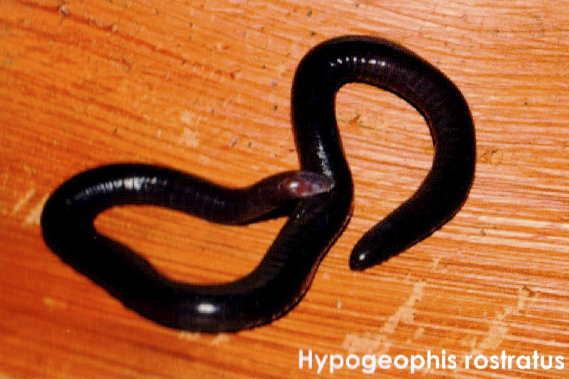

Scientific classification
- Kingdom: Animalia
- Phylum: Chordata
- Class: Amphibia
- Order: Gymnophiona
- Clade: Apoda
- Family: Grandisoniidae; Lescure, Renous & Gasc, 1986

Genera
- Gegeneophis; Grandisonia; Hypogeophis; Idiocranium; Indotyphlus; Praslinia; Sylvacaecilia

= Grandisoniidae =

Family of amphibians

The Grandisoniidae are a family of common caecilians found in Africa, Seychelles and India. Like other caecilians, they superficially resemble worms or snakes. The family was formerly known as Indotyphlidae.

== Taxonomy ==
The genera in this family were originally placed in family Caeciliidae. In 2011, the genera Gegeneophis, Grandisonia, Hypogeophis, Idiocranium, Indotyphlus, Praslinia and Sylvacaecilia were segregated into family Indotyphlidae, named after the tribe Indotyphlini, which was used by Lescure et al (1986) for the Indian genera, Gegeneophis and Indotyphlus. However, it was later pointed out that the name Grandisoniidae is the appropriate family-group name because, according to rules of the Nomenclatural Code, a name published at higher rank, Grandisoniinae, has precedence over a name of lower rank published in the same work, Indotyphlini.

== Genera and species ==
- Genus Gegeneophis
  - Gegeneophis carnosus
  - Gegeneophis danieli
  - Gegeneophis goaensis
  - Gegeneophis krishni
  - Gegeneophis madhavai
  - Gegeniophis mhadeiensis
  - Gegeneophis orientalis
  - Gegeneophis pareshi
  - Gegeneophis primus
  - Gegeneophis ramaswamii
  - Gegeneophis seshachari
  - Gegeneophis tejaswini
- Genus Grandisonia
  - Grandisonia alternans
  - Grandisonia larvata
  - Grandisonia sechellensis
- Genus Hypogeophis
  - Hypogeophis brevis
  - Hypogeophis montanus
  - Hypogeophis pti
  - Hypogeophis rostratus
- Genus Idiocranium
  - Idiocranium russeli
- Genus Indotyphlus
  - Indotyphlus battersbyi
  - Indotyphlus maharashtraensis
- Genus Praslinia
  - Praslinia cooperi
- Genus Sylvacaecilia
  - Sylvacaecilia grandisonae
