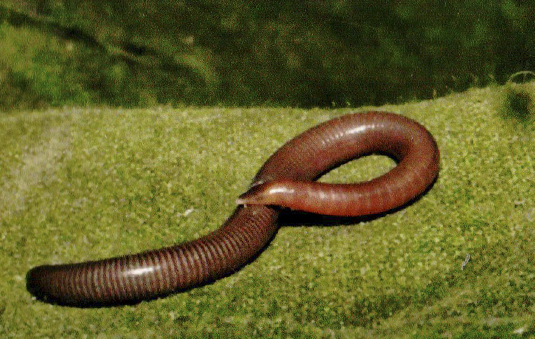

Conservation status
- Endangered (IUCN 3.1)

Scientific classification
- Kingdom: Animalia
- Phylum: Chordata
- Class: Amphibia
- Order: Gymnophiona
- Clade: Apoda
- Family: Grandisoniidae
- Genus: Hypogeophis
- Species: H. larvatus

Binomial name
- Hypogeophis larvatus (Ahl, 1934)

Synonyms
- Dermophis larvatus Ahl, 1934; Hypogeophis angusticeps Parker, 1941; Grandisonia larvata Taylor, 1968

= Hypogeophis larvatus =

Species of amphibian

Hypogeophis larvatus, commonly called the Indian Ocean caecilian is a species of caecilian in the family Indotyphlidae, endemic to the Seychelles islands of Mahé, Praslin, La Digue, and Silhouette.
