= Hypogeophis sechellensis =

Conservation status
- Endangered (IUCN 3.1)

Scientific classification
- Kingdom: Animalia
- Phylum: Chordata
- Class: Amphibia
- Order: Gymnophiona
- Clade: Apoda
- Family: Grandisoniidae
- Genus: Hypogeophis
- Species: H. sechellensis

Binomial name
- Hypogeophis sechellensis (Boulenger, 1911)

Synonyms
- Dermophis sechellensis Boulenger, 1911; Dermophis flaviventer Ahl, 1926; Grandisonia sechellensis Taylor, 1968; Grandisonia diminutiva Taylor, 1968

Species of amphibian

Hypogeophis sechellensis, commonly called the Seychelles caecilian, is a species of caecilian in the family Indotyphlidae. It is endemic to the Seychelles islands of Mahé, Praslin, and Silhouette.
