= Praslinia =

Conservation status
- Endangered (IUCN 3.1)

Scientific classification
- Kingdom: Animalia
- Phylum: Chordata
- Class: Amphibia
- Order: Gymnophiona
- Clade: Apoda
- Family: Grandisoniidae
- Genus: Praslinia; Boulenger, 1909
- Species: P. cooperi

Binomial name
- Praslinia cooperi Boulenger, 1909

Genus of amphibians

Praslinia cooperi, or Cooper's black caecilian, is a species of caecilian in the family Grandisoniidae. It is monotypic in the genus Praslinia. It is found on Mahé and Silhouette Islands in the Seychelles. An old reported sighting on its namesake Praslin is not known to be correct.
