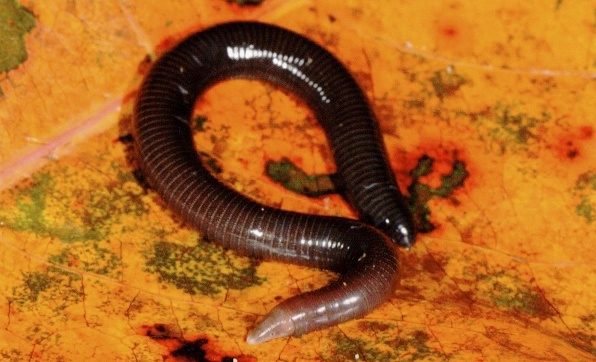

Scientific classification
- Kingdom: Animalia
- Phylum: Chordata
- Class: Amphibia
- Order: Gymnophiona
- Clade: Apoda
- Family: Grandisoniidae
- Genus: Hypogeophis; Peters, 1880

Species
- 7 species (see text)

Synonyms
- Grandisonia (Taylor, 1968)

= Hypogeophis =

Genus of amphibians

Hypogeophis is a genus of caecilians in the family Grandisoniidae. The genus consists of seven species, all endemic to parts of the Seychelles Archipelago.

Following phylogenetic analyses published in 2021, the former genus Grandisonia was folded into Hypogeophis as a junior synonym.

== Species ==
The genus has seven recognized species:

- Hypogeophis alternans Stejneger, 1893
- Hypogeophis brevis Boulenger, 1911
- Hypogeophis larvatus (Ahl, 1934)
- Hypogeophis montanus Maddock, Wilkinson, and Gower, 2018
- Hypogeophis pti Maddock, Wilkinson, Nussbaum and Gower, 2017
- Hypogeophis rostratus (Cuvier, 1829)
- Hypogeophis sechellensis (Boulenger, 1911)
