= Phelsuma pusilla hallmanni =

Scientific classification
- Kingdom: Animalia
- Phylum: Chordata
- Class: Reptilia
- Order: Squamata
- Suborder: Gekkota
- Family: Gekkonidae
- Genus: Phelsuma
- Species: P. pusilla
- Subspecies: P. p. hallmanni

Trinomial name
- Phelsuma pusilla hallmanni Meier, 1989

Subspecies of lizard

Phelsuma pusilla hallmanni is a diurnal subspecies of gecko, a lizard in the family Gekkonidae. The subspecies is endemic to eastern Madagascar and typically inhabits different trees. This day gecko feeds on insects and nectar.

== Etymology ==
The subspecific name, hallmanni, is in honor of German herpetologist Gerhard Hallmann.

== Description ==
Ph. p. hallmanni belongs to the smallest day geckos. It can reach a total length (including tail) of about 10 cm (3.9 in).

The body colour is dark green. On the back there are red dots present. On the snout, a blue triangle is present, which is bordered from behind by a red bar. On the neck and back of the head bluish speckles are present. The tail is turquoise. The flanks are brown or black. The ventral side is white.

== Geographic range ==
The subspecies Ph. p. hallmanni inhabits the east coast of Madagascar. It is only known from the region around Andasibe.

== Habitat ==
Ph. p. hallmanni lives in a moist and warm climate. It inhabits different trees and can often be found on trees on the edge of forest along the road.

== Diet ==
Ph. p. hallmanni feeds on various insects and other invertebrates. It also likes to lick soft, sweet fruit, pollen and nectar.

== Behaviour ==
Ph. p. hallmanni is quite quarrelsome and does not accept other males. In captivity, where the female cannot escape, the male can also sometimes seriously wound a female. In this case the male and female must be separated.

== Reproduction ==
Ph. p. hallmanni is oviparous. The pairing season is between October and the first weeks of May.

== Care and maintenance in captivity ==
Ph. p. hallmanni should be housed in pairs and needs a well planted terrarium. The temperature should be about 28 °C (82 °F), locally around 30 °C (86 °F), during the day, and drop to around 20 °C (68 °F) at night. The humidity should be maintained between 75 and 80% during the day. It is also important to include two colder months with a daytime temperature of 24 °C (75 °F) and 16 °C (61 °F) at night. In captivity, it can be fed crickets, wax moth larvae, fruit flies, mealworms and houseflies.
