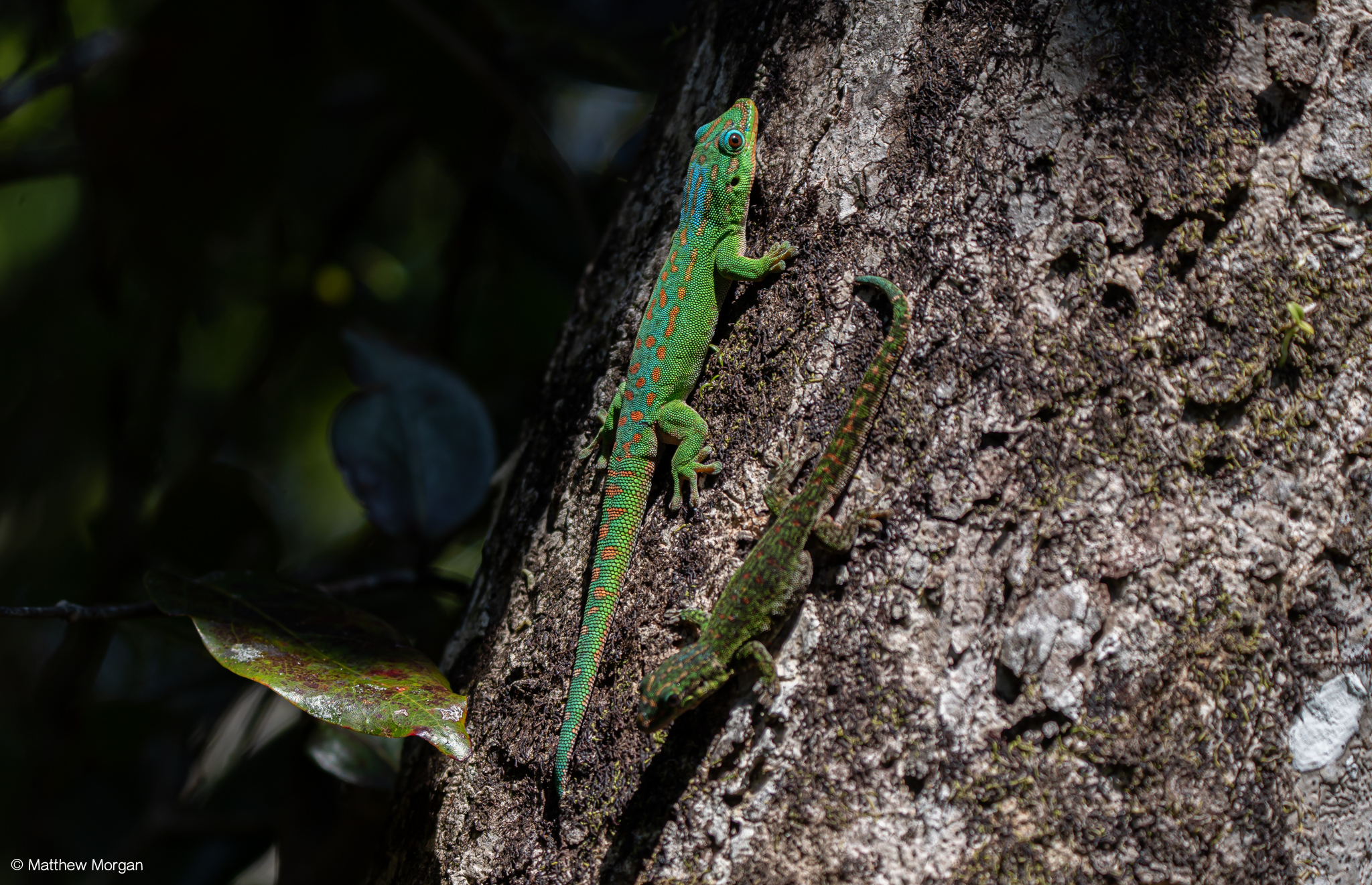

Conservation status
- Endangered (IUCN 3.1)

Scientific classification
- Domain: Eukaryota
- Kingdom: Animalia
- Phylum: Chordata
- Class: Reptilia
- Order: Squamata
- Infraorder: Gekkota
- Family: Gekkonidae
- Genus: Phelsuma
- Species: P. rosagularis

Binomial name
- Phelsuma rosagularis Vinson & Vinson, 1969

Synonyms
- Phelsuma guimbeaui rosagularis Vinson & Vinson, 1969

= Mauritius upland forest day gecko =

Species of lizard

Mauritius upland forest day gecko (Phelsuma rosagularis) is a diurnal species of geckos.

It lives in the upland forest of Mauritius and typically inhabits large trees. The Mauritius upland forest day gecko feeds on insects and nectar.

== Description ==
This lizard belongs to the mid-sized Phelsuma species. Males can reach a total length of about 15.5 cm. Females are only 9–13 cm. The Mauritius upland forest day gecko has a short, compact body form. The green body colour is paler than in the Mauritius lowland forest day gecko. The neck region may have a diffuse blue area. There are irregular shaped pale orange-red bars and spots on the back and tail. The rear portion of the tail often is turquoise or blue. The ventral side is light grey. The chin is pink or rust-coloured without the typical v-shaped baring as seen in Phelsuma guimbeaui. Juveniles are greyish-brown with little white spots. They start changing their colour after 6 months and after 12-15 they have the adult appearance.

== Distribution ==
This species inhabits the upland forest of Mauritius. It occurs only in parts of the mountain forests of Macchabée and Les Mares, the Brise Fer area, and in the mountain forest of Montagnes Bambous.

== Habitat ==
The Mauritius upland forest day gecko prefers large endemic forest trees. This day gecko is only rarely seen on secondary vegetation. P. rosagularis typically basks high on tree trunks.

== Diet ==
These day geckos feed on various insects and other invertebrates. They also like to lick soft, sweet fruit, pollen and nectar.

== Behaviour ==
The Mauritius upland forest day gecko is rather shy because it is heavily predated by different bird species.

== Reproduction ==
The pairing season is between march and the first weeks of September. During this period, the females lay up to 6 pairs of eggs. The young will hatch after approximately 60–90 days. The juveniles measure 36–40 mm. The Mauritius lowland forest day gecko is an egg gluer and often a colony nester. Tree holes are often used to lay the eggs in. Juveniles reach pubescence after 18–20 months.

== Care and maintenance in captivity ==
These animals should be housed in pairs and need a large, well planted terrarium. The daytime temperature should be between 29 and 32 °C. During the night, the temperature should drop to approximately 20 °C. The humidity should be maintained between 60 and 70. In captivity, these animals can be fed with crickets, wax moth, fruits flies, meal worms and houseflies.
