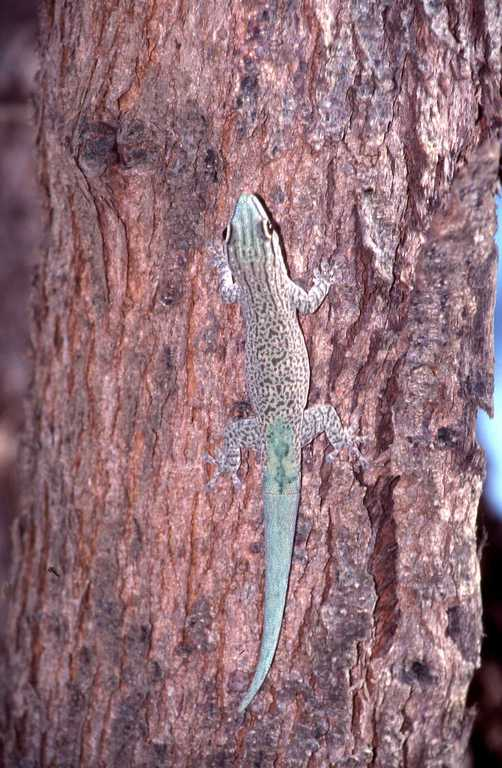

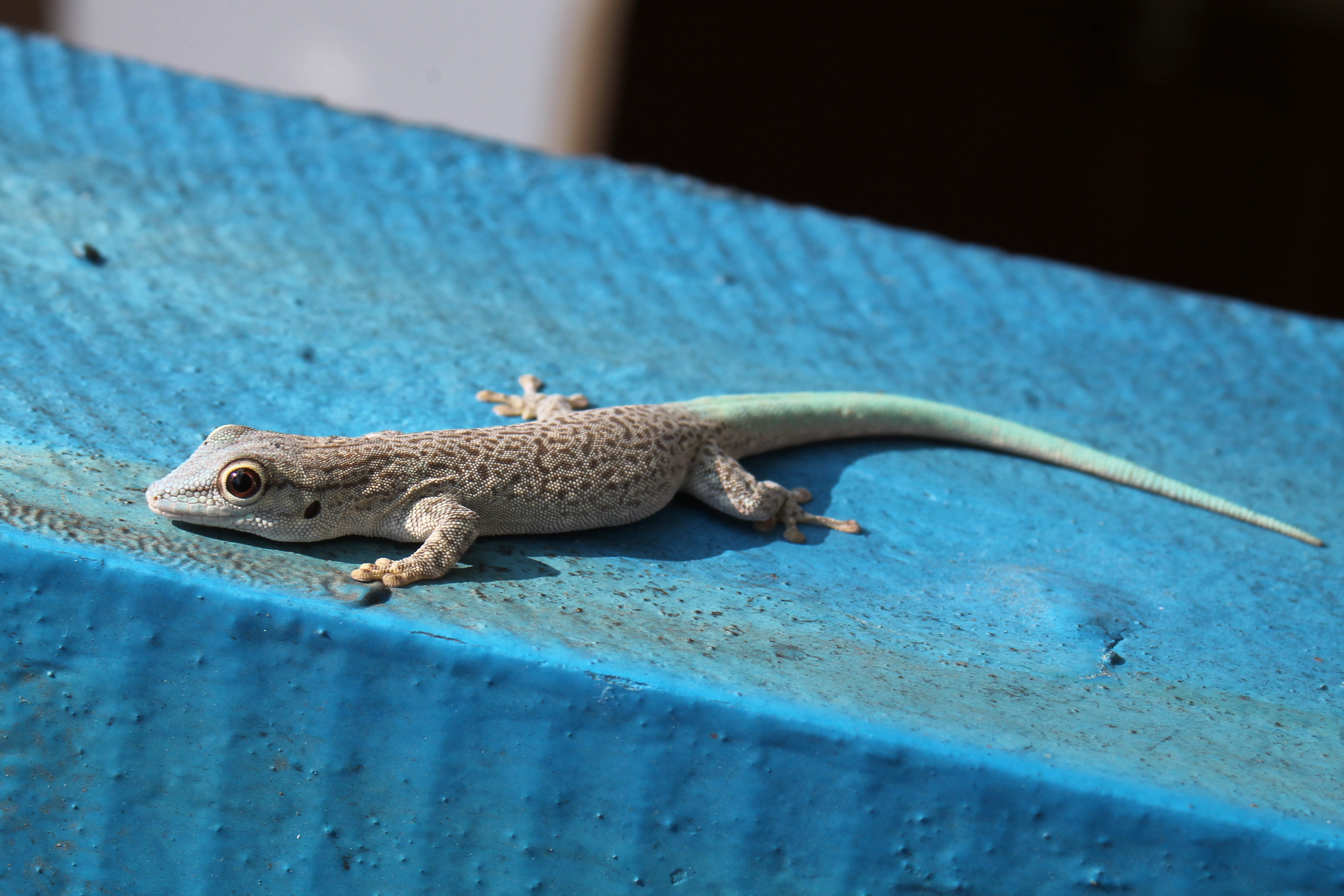

Conservation status
- Least Concern (IUCN 3.1)

Scientific classification
- Kingdom: Animalia
- Phylum: Chordata
- Class: Reptilia
- Order: Squamata
- Suborder: Gekkota
- Family: Gekkonidae
- Genus: Phelsuma
- Species: P. mutabilis

Binomial name
- Phelsuma mutabilis (Grandidier, 1869)
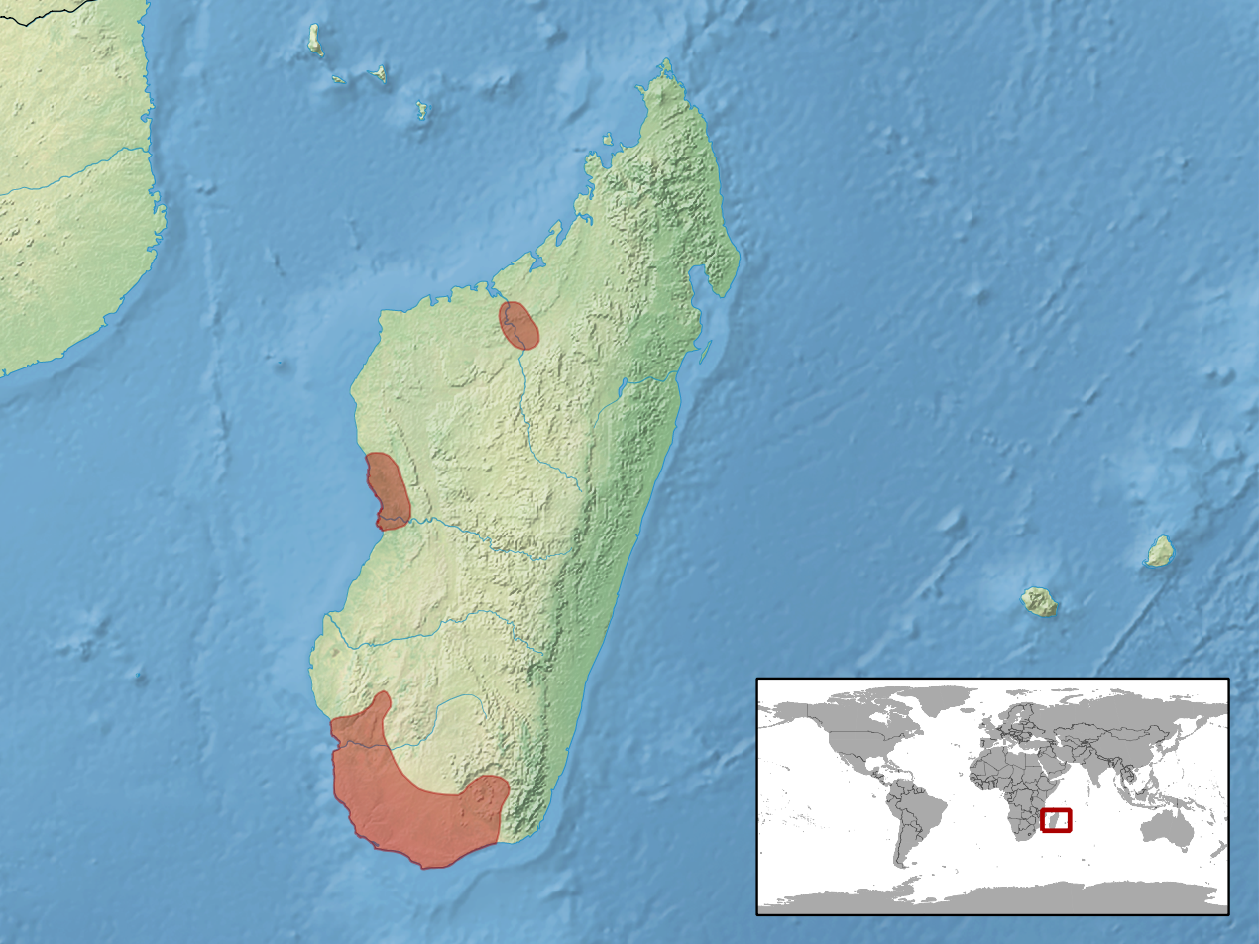

Synonyms
- Pachydactylus mutabilis Grandidier, 1869; Phelsuma androyense Mocquard, 1901; Phelsumia micropholis Boettger, 1913

= Phelsuma mutabilis =

Species of lizard

The thicktail day gecko (Phelsuma mutabilis) is a species of gecko found in Madagascar.
