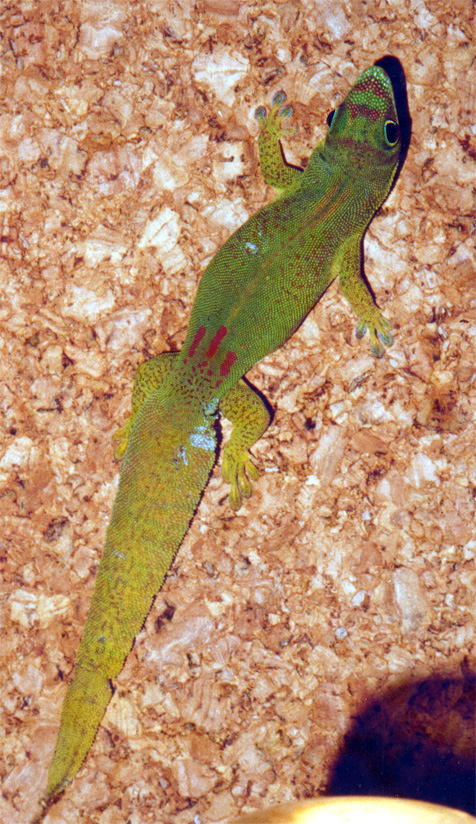

Conservation status
- Endangered (IUCN 3.1)

Scientific classification
- Kingdom: Animalia
- Phylum: Chordata
- Class: Reptilia
- Order: Squamata
- Suborder: Gekkota
- Family: Gekkonidae
- Genus: Phelsuma
- Species: P. serraticauda

Binomial name
- Phelsuma serraticauda Mertens, 1963
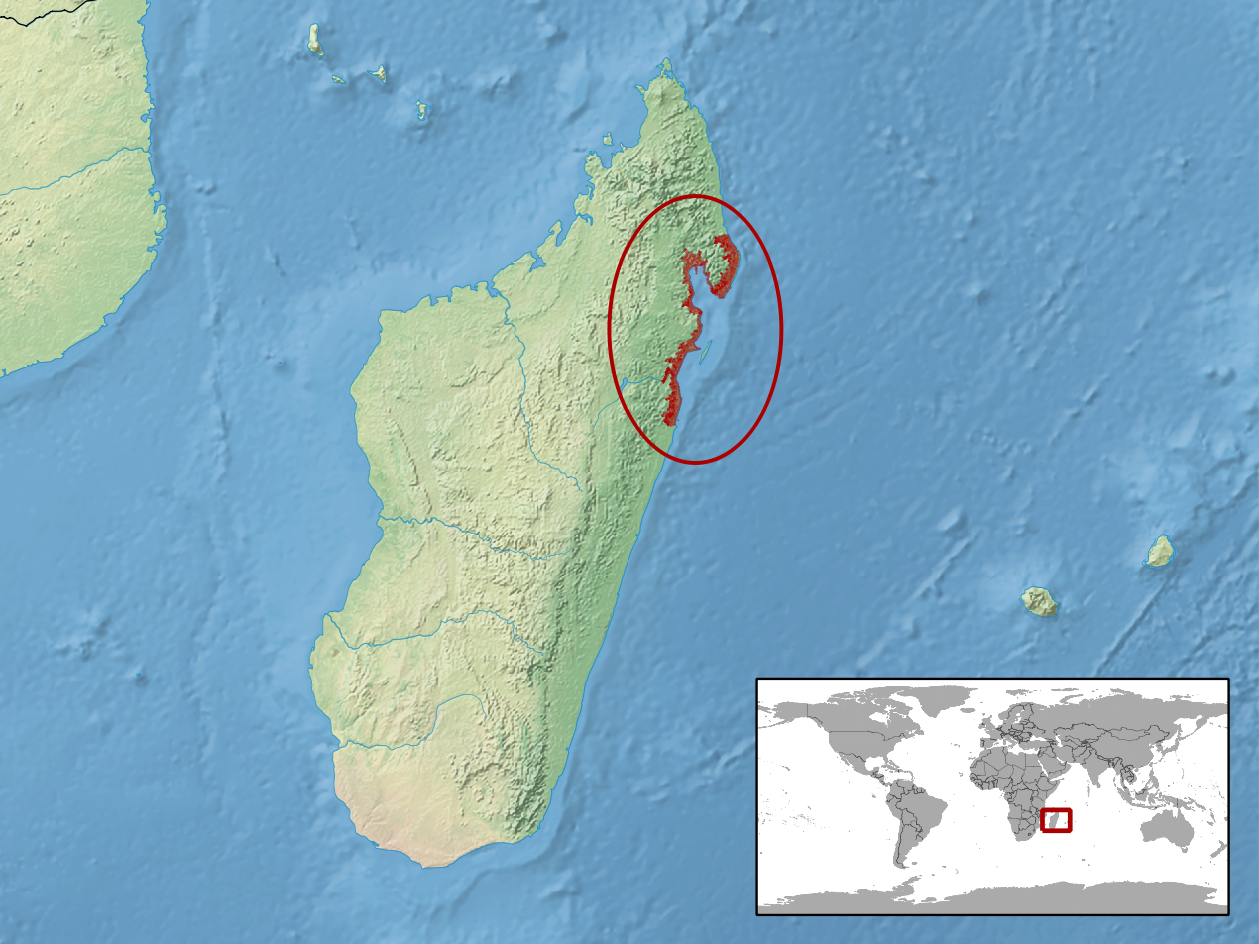

= Flat-tailed day gecko =

Species of lizard

The flat-tailed day gecko (Phelsuma serraticauda) is a diurnal gecko lives in eastern Madagascar. It is endangered due to illegal collection for the international pet trade. It typically inhabits rainforests and dwells on trees. The flat-tailed day gecko feeds on insects and nectar.

== Description ==
This lizard can reach an average total length of about 13 cm whereas females are slightly smaller. Some males may even reach a length of 15 cm. The body colour is dark green or yellowish green. Remarkable is the broad, flattened tail with serrated edges. On the lower back three red tear-shaped markings dots are present. On the neck, which may be bluish, two longitudinal yellow stripes are present. On the snout and head, there are three transversal red bars.

== Distribution ==
This species occurs on the east coast of Madagascar. It is only known from the region 12 km north of Toamasina.

== Habitat ==
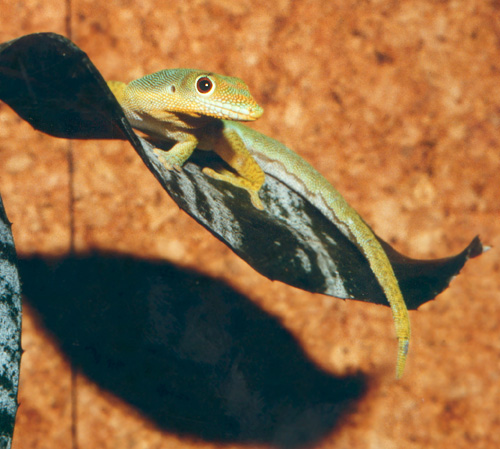
Phelsuma serraticauda on a leaf.

Phelsuma serraticauda is largely restricted to coconut palms yet can also be found on banana trees.

== Diet ==
These day geckos feed on various insects and other invertebrates. They also like to lick soft, sweet fruit, pollen and nectar.

== Behaviour ==
This species lives in groups with one male and up to five females. Amongst the females, there is a well-developed dominance hierarchy. Juveniles are tolerated up to a certain size.

== Reproduction ==
The females lay up to 4 pairs of eggs per year. At a temperature of 28 °C, the young will hatch after approximately 53–58 days. The juveniles are typically 40 mm in length.

== Captivity ==
The flat-tailed day gecko is endangered due to illegal collection for the international pet trade.
