= Phelsuma hoeschi =

Conservation status
- Data Deficient (IUCN 3.1)

Scientific classification
- Kingdom: Animalia
- Phylum: Chordata
- Class: Reptilia
- Order: Squamata
- Suborder: Gekkota
- Family: Gekkonidae
- Genus: Phelsuma
- Species: P. hoeschi

Binomial name
- Phelsuma hoeschi Berghof & Trautmann, 2009
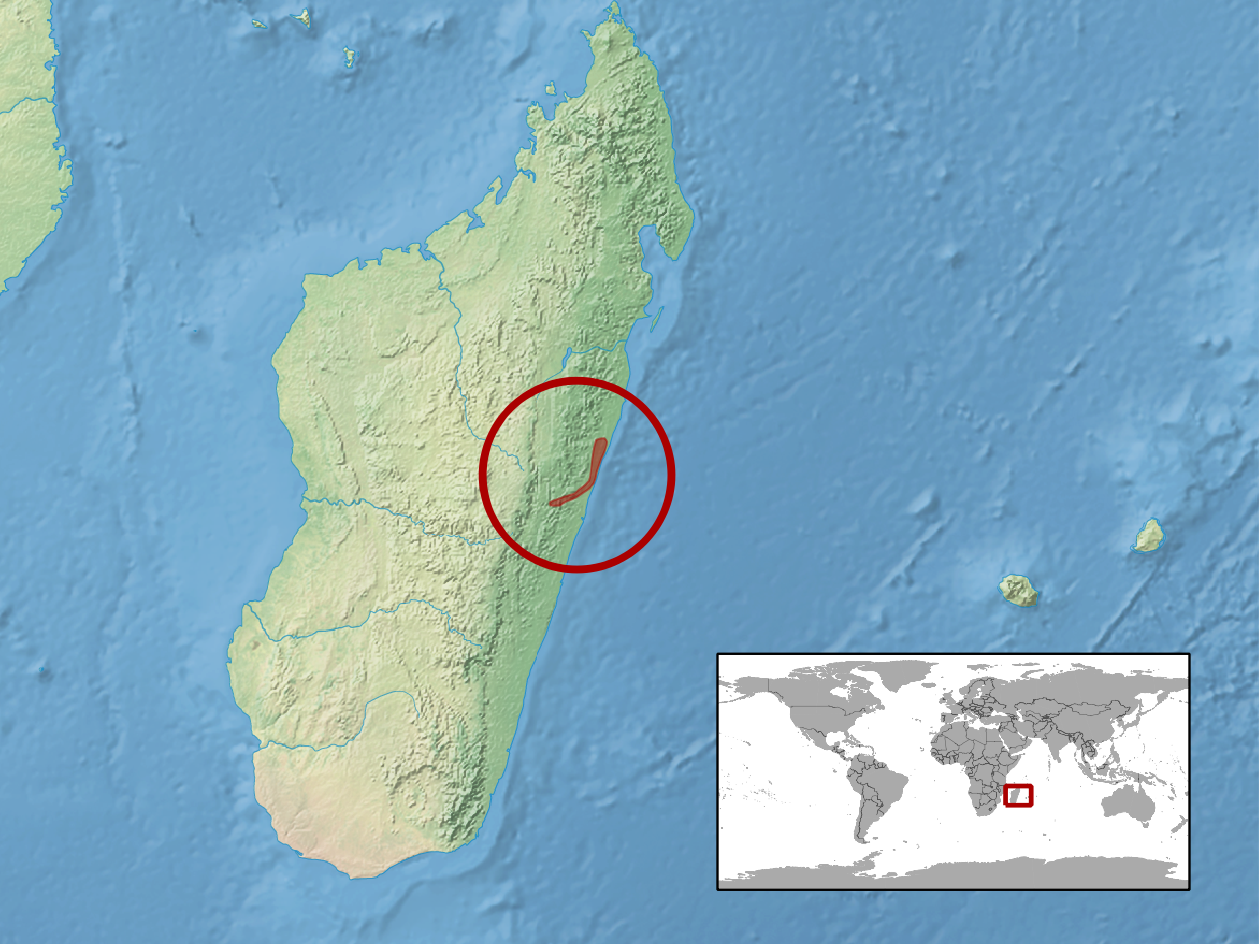

Species of lizard

Phelsuma hoeschi is a species of gecko, a lizard in the family Gekkonidae. The species is endemic to the Atsinanana Region of Madagascar.

== Etymology ==
The specific name, hoeschi, is in honor of German amateur herpetologist Udo Hoesch, who discovered this species.

== Habitat ==
The preferred natural habitat of P. hoeschi is unknown, as the species has only been collected from disturbed habitats near beaches and villages, at altitudes of 12–594 m (39–1,949 ft).

== Reproduction ==
P. hoeschi is oviparous. Eggs are laid in knotholes of small trees.
