= Phelsuma vanheygeni =

Conservation status
- Endangered (IUCN 3.1)

Scientific classification
- Kingdom: Animalia
- Phylum: Chordata
- Class: Reptilia
- Order: Squamata
- Suborder: Gekkota
- Family: Gekkonidae
- Genus: Phelsuma
- Species: P. vanheygeni

Binomial name
- Phelsuma vanheygeni Lerner, 2004
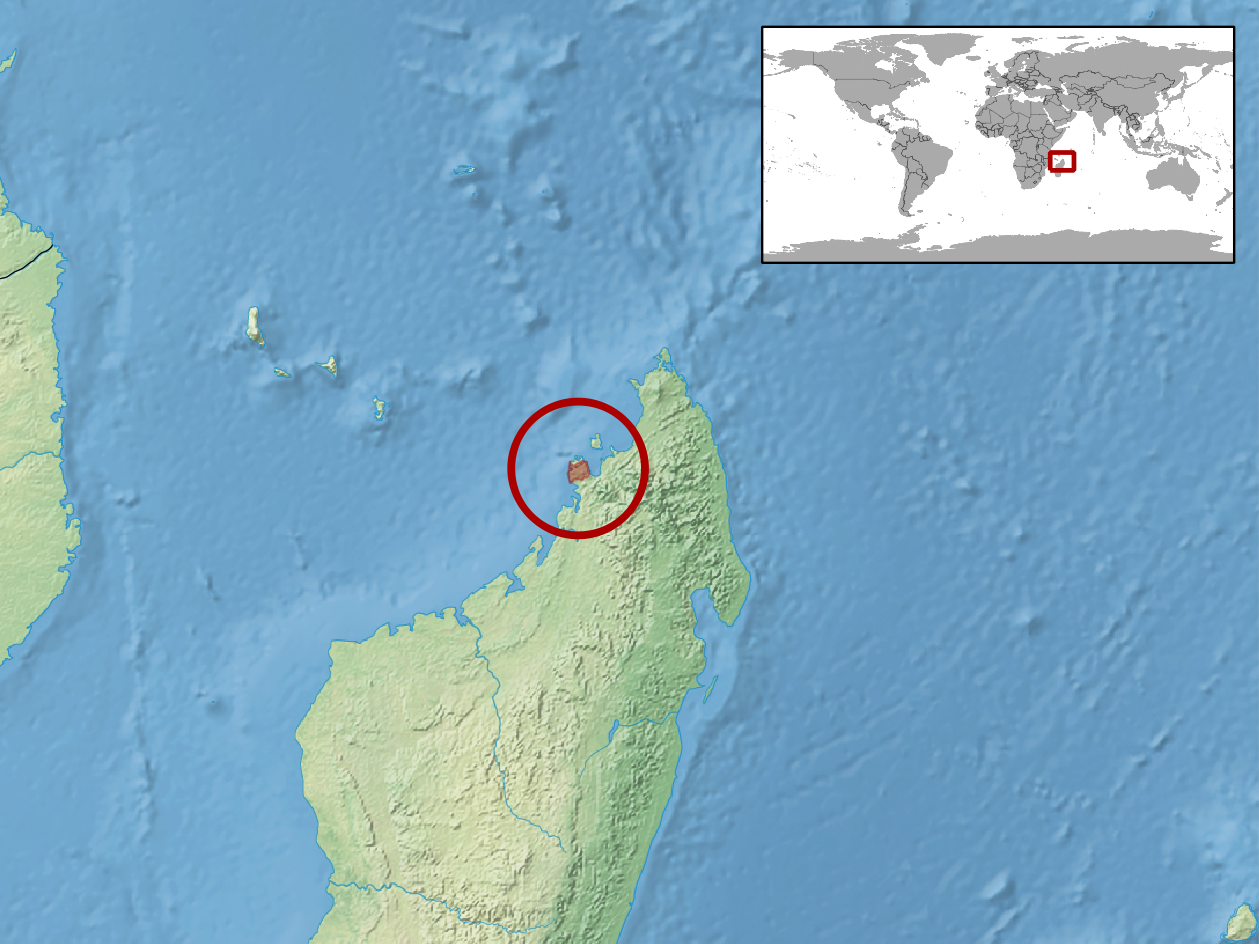

Species of lizard

Phelsuma vanheygeni is a species of gecko, a lizard in the family Gekkonidae. The species is endemic to Madagascar.

== Etymology ==
The specific name, vanheygeni, is in honor of Belgian herpetologist Emmanuel Van Heygen, who collected the holotype.

== Geographic range ==
P. vanheygeni is found on the Ampasindava peninsula in northern Madagascar.

== Habitat ==
The natural habitat of P. vanheygeni is patches of bamboo in forest, at altitudes of 50–400 m (160–1,310 ft). It appears to be confined to medium-sized bamboo (about 5 cm (2 in) in diameter).

== Description ==
P. vanheygeni measure 31–35 mm (1.2–1.4 in) in snout–vent length and 75–80 mm (3.0–3.1 in) in total length. It is somewhat slender and rather flattened. The dorsal coloration of living specimens (including the head, neck, limbs and tail) is vivid green. There are some small red dots irregularly positioned on the lower back and upper tail; males have usually slightly bigger red dots. The green dorsal coloration is delimited by a yellowish stripe that begins at the rostral scale, continues backwards over the supralabial scales, under the ear opening, and widens at the axilla. The ventral coloration is dirty white; the subcaudal scales have a brown to black pigmentation at their tips. The Ventral and subcaudal scales are smooth (not keeled).

== Reproduction ==
P. vanheygeni is oviparous and glues its eggs to the inside of bamboo stems.
