= Phelsuma ravenala =

Conservation status
- Least Concern (IUCN 3.1)

Scientific classification
- Kingdom: Animalia
- Phylum: Chordata
- Class: Reptilia
- Order: Squamata
- Suborder: Gekkota
- Family: Gekkonidae
- Genus: Phelsuma
- Species: P. ravenala

Binomial name
- Phelsuma ravenala Raxworthy, Ingram, Rabibisoa & Pearson, 2007
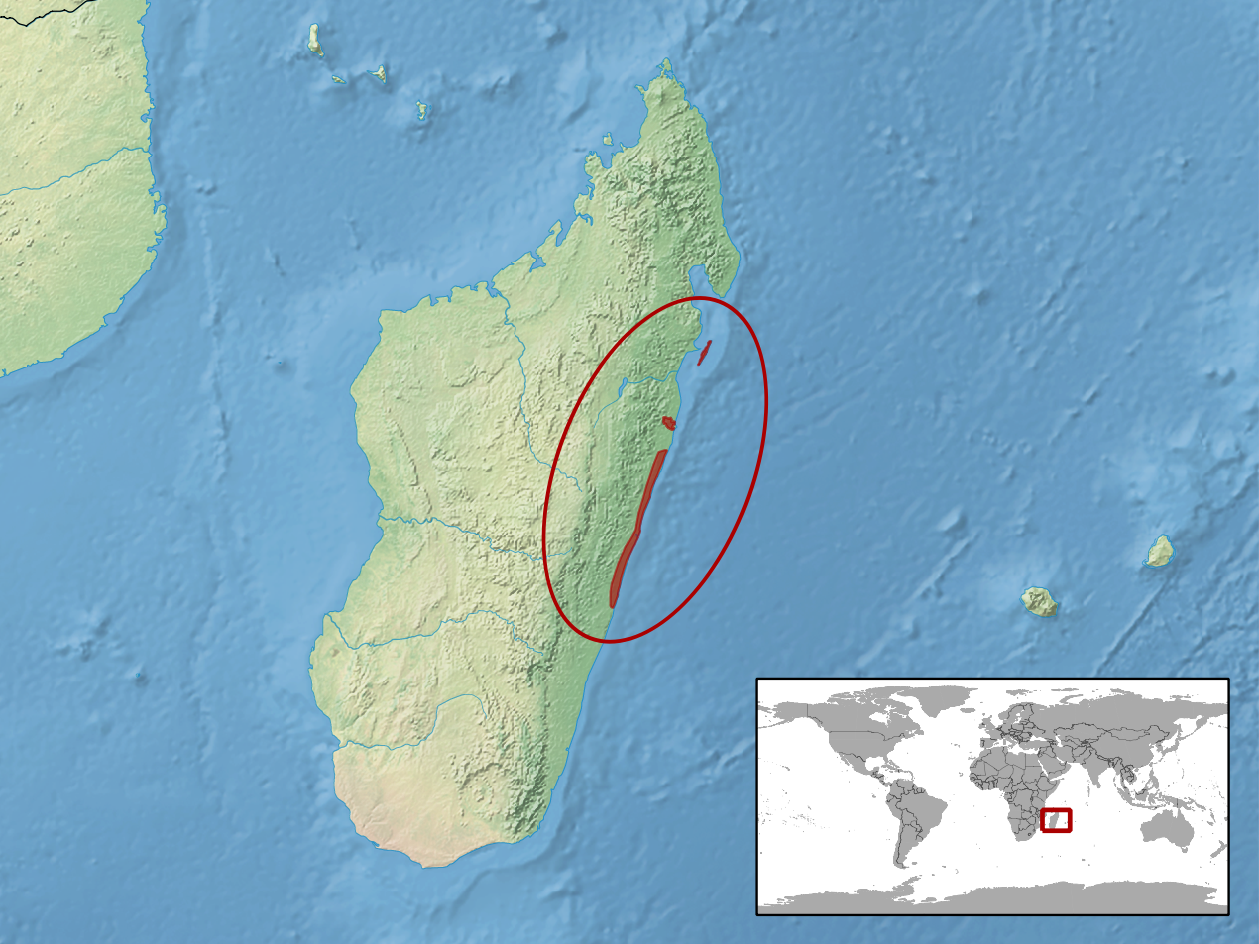

Species of lizard

Phelsuma ravenala is a species of gecko. It is endemic to Madagascar, where it is found in the regions of Vatovavy-Fitovinany, Atsinanana and Analanjirofo.

== Description ==
Medium sized Phelsuma, 49mm to 61mm as adults, with slender body. Primarily green body with reddish brown spots on body, white throat and lacking dark chevrons. Dorsolateral scales are much larger than dorsal scales.

== Etymology ==
The species name was given in reference to the plant it was discovered on, Ravenala madagascariensis.
