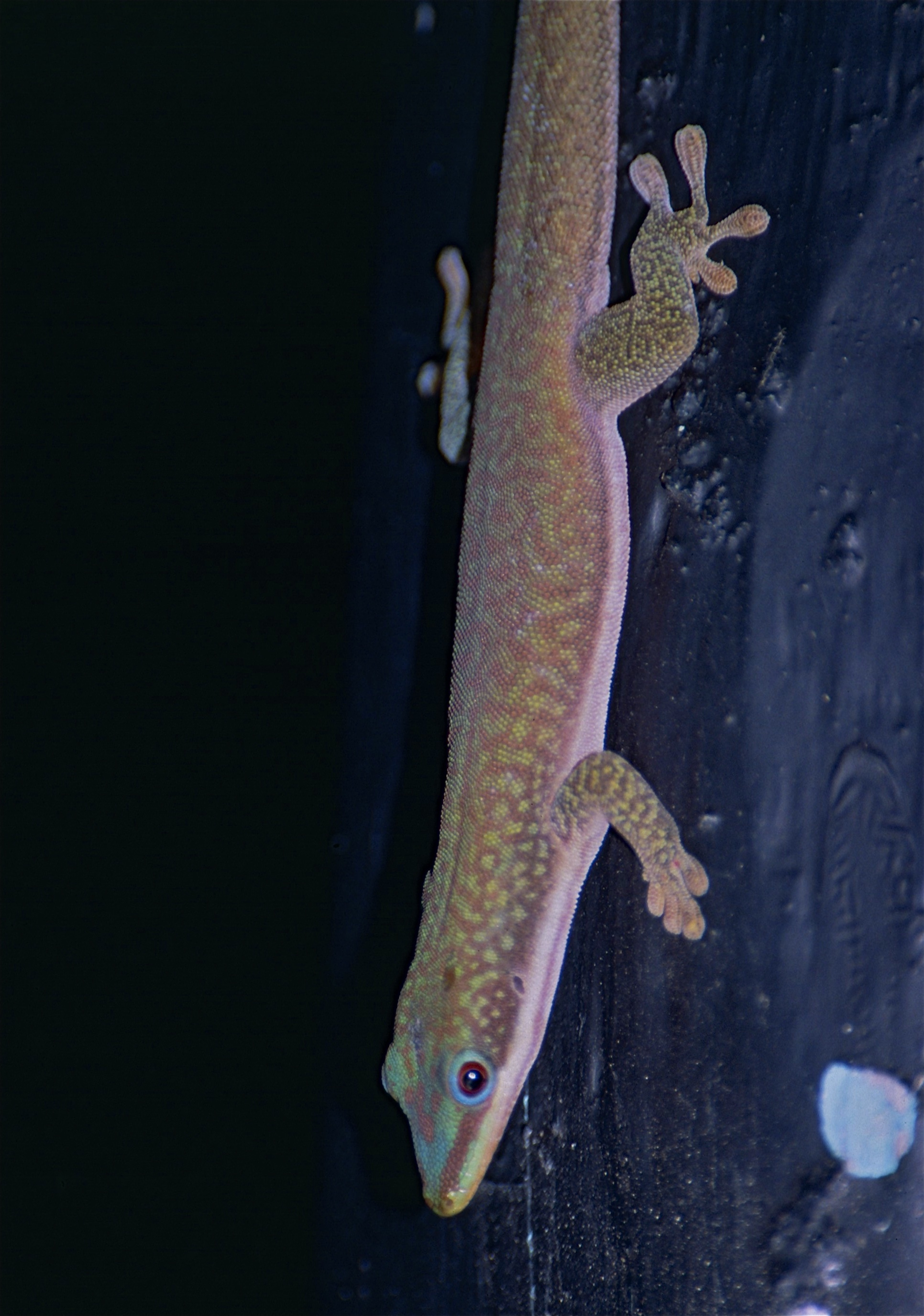

Conservation status
- Vulnerable (IUCN 3.1)

Scientific classification
- Kingdom: Animalia
- Phylum: Chordata
- Class: Reptilia
- Order: Squamata
- Suborder: Gekkota
- Family: Gekkonidae
- Genus: Phelsuma
- Species: P. hielscheri

Binomial name
- Phelsuma hielscheri Rösler, Obst & Seipp, 2001
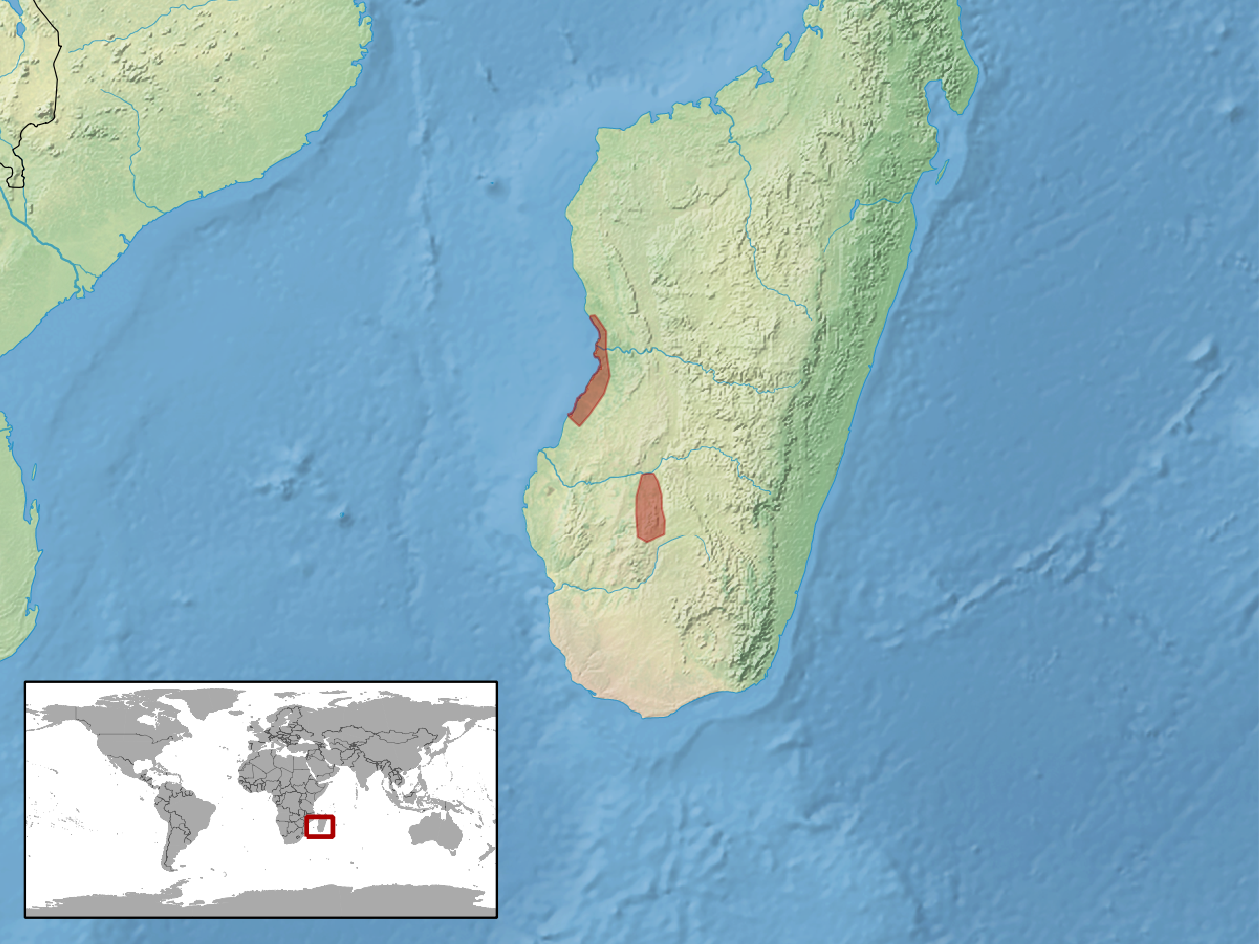

= Phelsuma hielscheri =

Species of lizard

Phelsuma hielscheri is a species of gecko, a lizard in the family Gekkonidae. The species is endemic to Madagascar.

== Etymology ==
The specific name, hielscheri, is in honor of German biochemist Michael Hielscher who was one of the discoverers of this species.

== Geographic range ==
Phelsuma hielscheri is found in central and western Madagascar, at elevations from sea level to 900 m (3,000 ft).

== Description ==
Males of P. hielscheri are larger than females. The maximum recorded total length (including tail) for a male is 17 cm (6.7 in), whereas for a female it is only 15 centimetres (5.9 in).

== Habitat ==
Phelsuma hielscheri is found on screw palms (Pandanus) in both wild and urban settings.

== Reproduction ==
Phelsuma hielscheri is oviparous.
