= Phelsuma pronki =

Conservation status
- Endangered (IUCN 3.1)

Scientific classification
- Kingdom: Animalia
- Phylum: Chordata
- Class: Reptilia
- Order: Squamata
- Suborder: Gekkota
- Family: Gekkonidae
- Genus: Phelsuma
- Species: P. pronki

Binomial name
- Phelsuma pronki Seipp, 1994
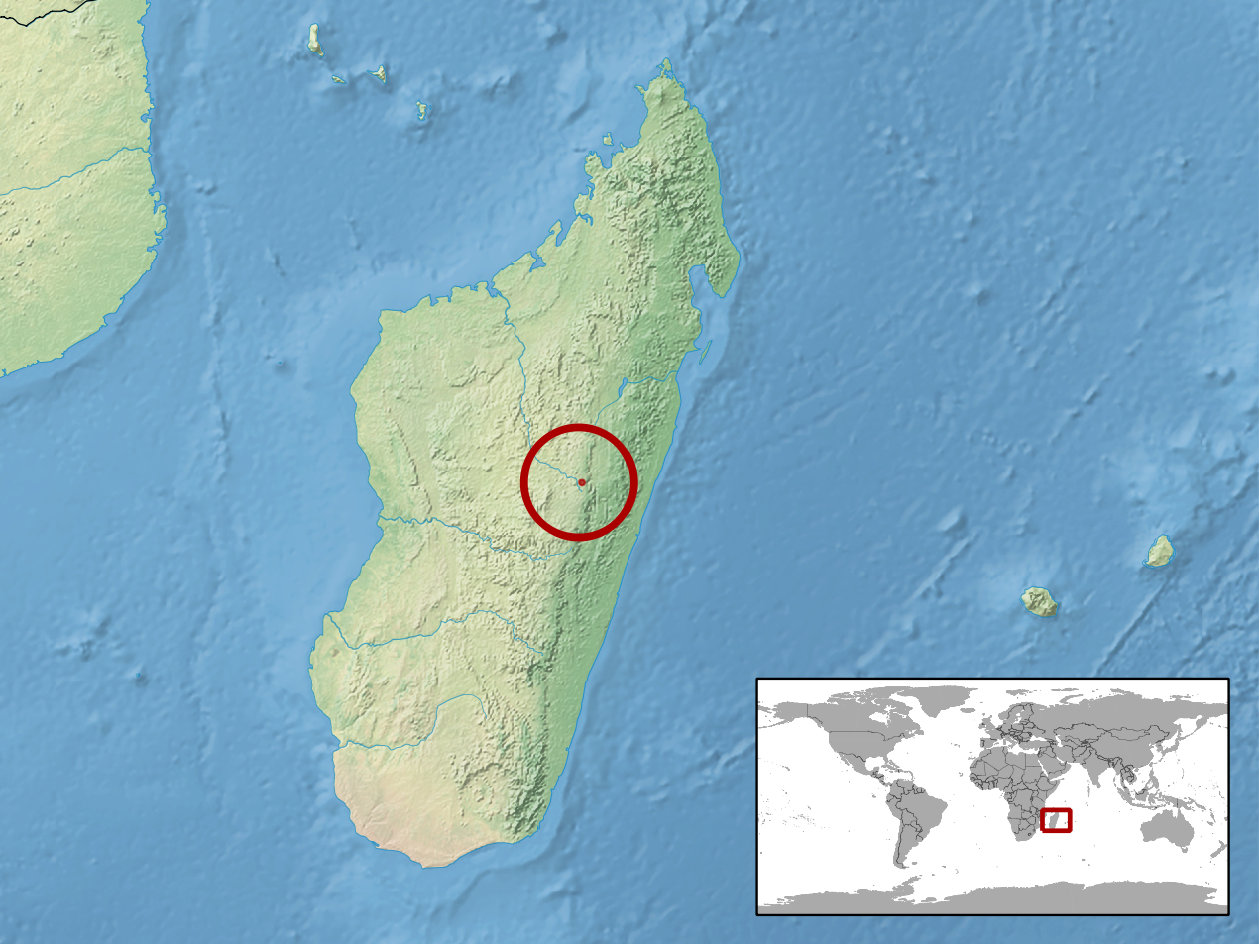

Species of lizard

Phelsuma pronki, also known as Pronk's day gecko, is a critically endangered diurnal species of gecko, a lizard in the family Gekkonidae. The species is endemic to central Madagascar, and threatened by severe habitat loss and collection for the international pet trade. It typically inhabits rainforests, dwells on trees, and feeds on insects and nectar.

== Etymology ==
The specific name, pronki, is in honor of Dutch naturalist Olaf Pronk.

== Description ==
P. pronki belongs to the smallest day geckos. It can reach a total length (including tail) of about 11 cm (4.3 in). The body colour is greyish, and the head is yellow. Four serrated black stripes extend from the snout to the tail. The extremities are blackish with grey speckles. A yellow eye ring is present.

== Geographic range ==
P. pronki inhabits the rainforest of the highland of central Madagascar near Andramasina.

== Habitat ==
The habitat of Phelsuma pronki is rainy and very moist. There is a huge difference in temperature between night and day and between the different seasons. During the colder months, the temperature can be as low as 4–6 °C (39–43 °F) at night, yet over 20 °C (68 °F) during the day.

== Diet ==
P. pronki feeds on various insects, other invertebrates, and nectar.

== Reproduction ==
The females of P. pronki glue their eggs under loose bark.

== Captivity ==
This critically endangered species is still wild-caught for the international pet trade. It can be captive-bred by experts.

Phelsuma pronki should be housed in pairs and need a well-planted terrarium which should provide many places to hide. It is important that there are some spot lights for basking. The daytime temperature should be around 29 °C (84 °F), while at night the temperature should drop to 20 °C (68 °F). The humidity should be maintained between 75 and 100%. In captivity, these animals can be fed with crickets, wax moth larvae, fruit flies, mealworms, and houseflies.
