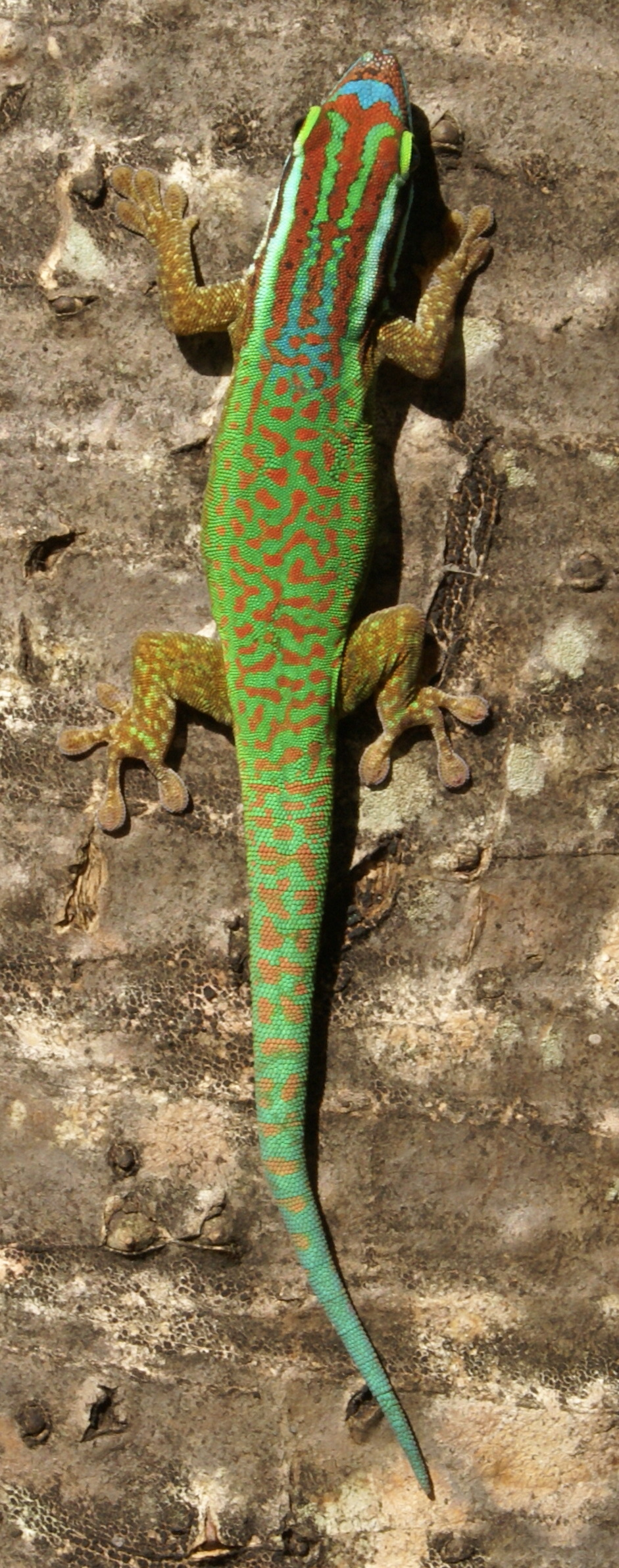

Conservation status
- Critically Endangered (IUCN 3.1)

Scientific classification
- Kingdom: Animalia
- Phylum: Chordata
- Class: Reptilia
- Order: Squamata
- Suborder: Gekkota
- Family: Gekkonidae
- Genus: Phelsuma
- Species: P. inexpectata

Binomial name
- Phelsuma inexpectata Mertens, 1966
- Approximate distribution Range Depicted: Reunion Island, Southern Africa

Synonyms
- Phelsuma ornata inexpectata Mertens, 1966; Phelsuma inexpectata Bour, 1995

= Réunion Island ornate day gecko =

Reunion Island ornate day gecko

Species of lizard

Reunion Island ornate day gecko or Manapany day gecko (Phelsuma inexpectata) is a critically endangered diurnal species of gecko. It occurs only on the island of Réunion in the Indian Ocean, typically inhabits trees, and feeds on insects and nectar.

== Description ==
This lizard is one of the smallest day geckos. It can reach a total length of about 12 cm at most. The body colour is dark green. Three red stripes extend from the snout to the neck. From behind the eye, a thick brown stripe and a thin green-white extend to above the front leg. The snout is partly dark blue. The back is covered with reddish-coloured dots, which are greatly reduced in females. The ventral side is off-white.

== Distribution and habitat ==
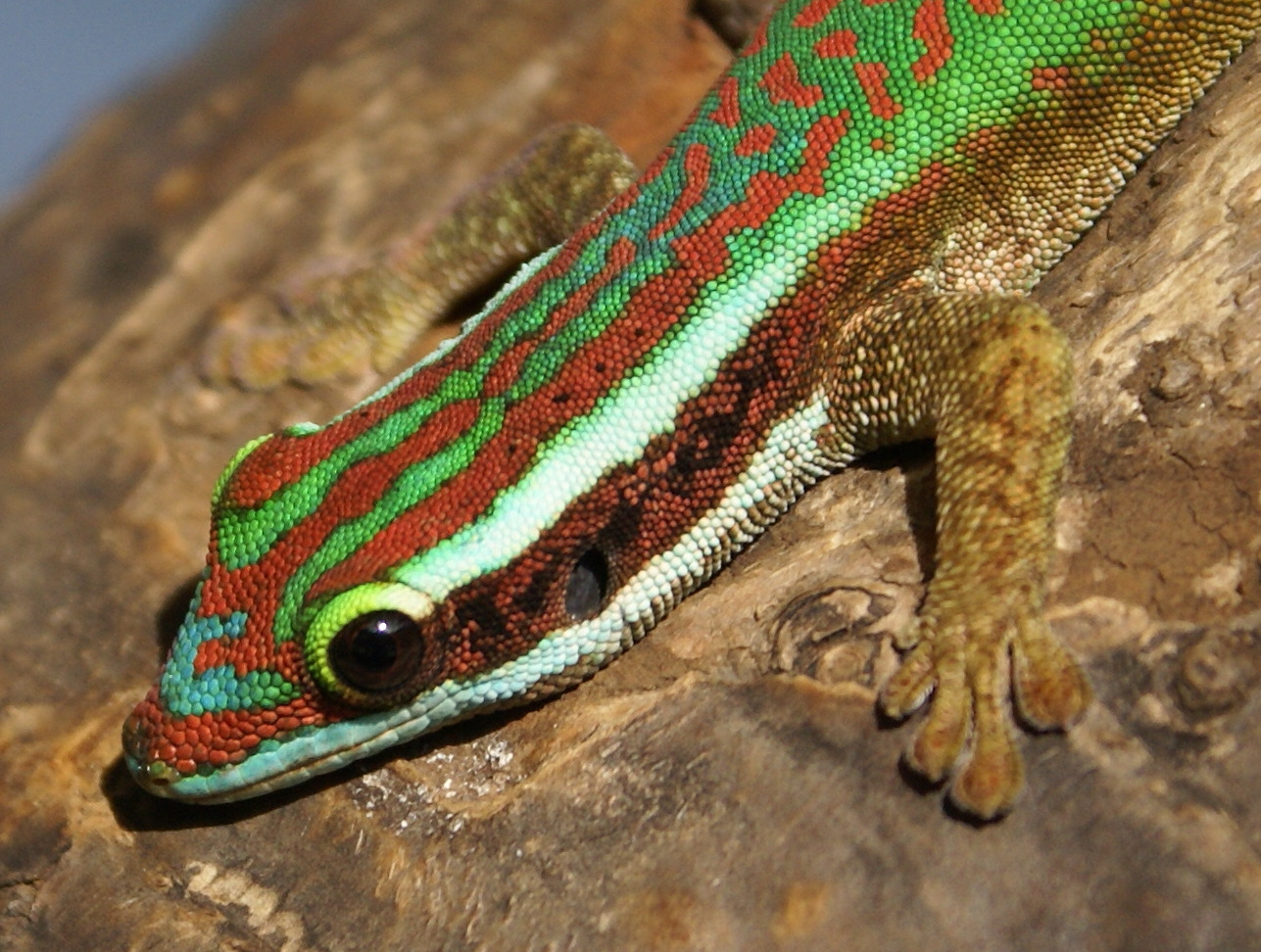
On a common screwpine

This species is endemic to Réunion. It is found in the coastal areas in the region of Manapany-Les-Bains and St.-Joseph. This coastal ecosystem is among the most threatened on the island, and the gecko's habitat is severely fragmented by urbanization and agriculture.

It typically lives on trees such as papaya, banana, pandanus and other pantropic vegetation. The geckos also inhabit human dwellings and have been spotted on postboxes and fences. This biotope is relatively dry and hot.

== Behaviour ==
=== Feeding ===
They feed on various insects and other invertebrates. They also like to lick soft sweet fruit, pollen and nectar.

=== Breeding ===
At a temperature of 28 °C, the young will hatch after approximately 50–52 days. The juveniles measure around 48 mm.

== Status and conservation ==
The species is critically endangered, with a population of 3-5 thousand in 2011. The population is shrinking rapidly: in 1995, it was estimated at 5-10 thousand. It is listed in CITES Appendix II.

=== Captivity ===
The geckos can be quite shy in captivity and are also surprisingly speedy. There is no information on the effect of the pet trade on the population. They are captive-bred by some dealers.
