= Phelsuma punctulata =

Scientific classification
- Kingdom: Animalia
- Phylum: Chordata
- Class: Reptilia
- Order: Squamata
- Suborder: Gekkota
- Family: Gekkonidae
- Genus: Phelsuma
- Species: P. punctulata

Binomial name
- Phelsuma punctulata Mertens, 1970

Species of lizard

Phelsuma punctulata, the striped day gecko, is a species of gecko, a lizard in the family Gekkonidae. The species is endemic to Madagascar.
