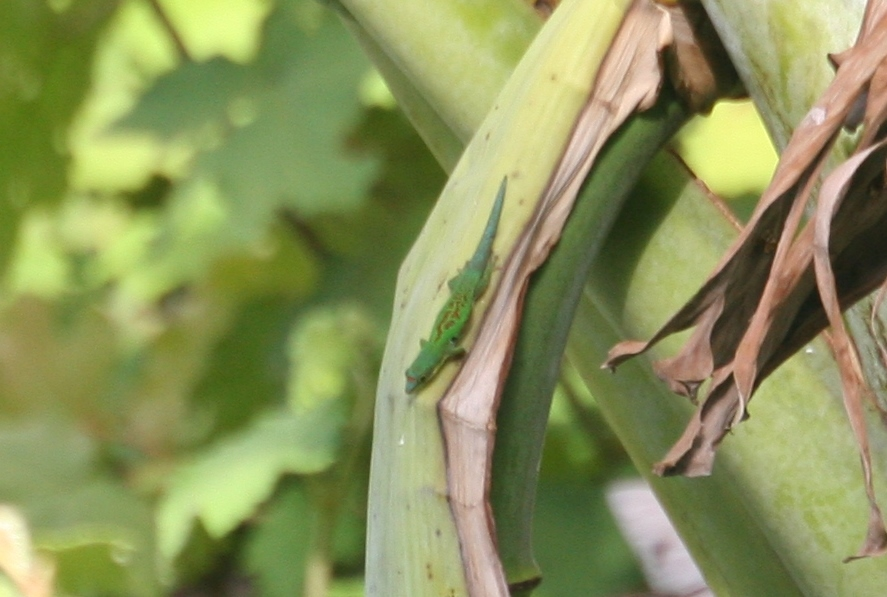

Conservation status
- Least Concern (IUCN 3.1)

Scientific classification
- Kingdom: Animalia
- Phylum: Chordata
- Class: Reptilia
- Order: Squamata
- Suborder: Gekkota
- Family: Gekkonidae
- Genus: Phelsuma
- Species: P. parva

Binomial name
- Phelsuma parva Meier, 1983
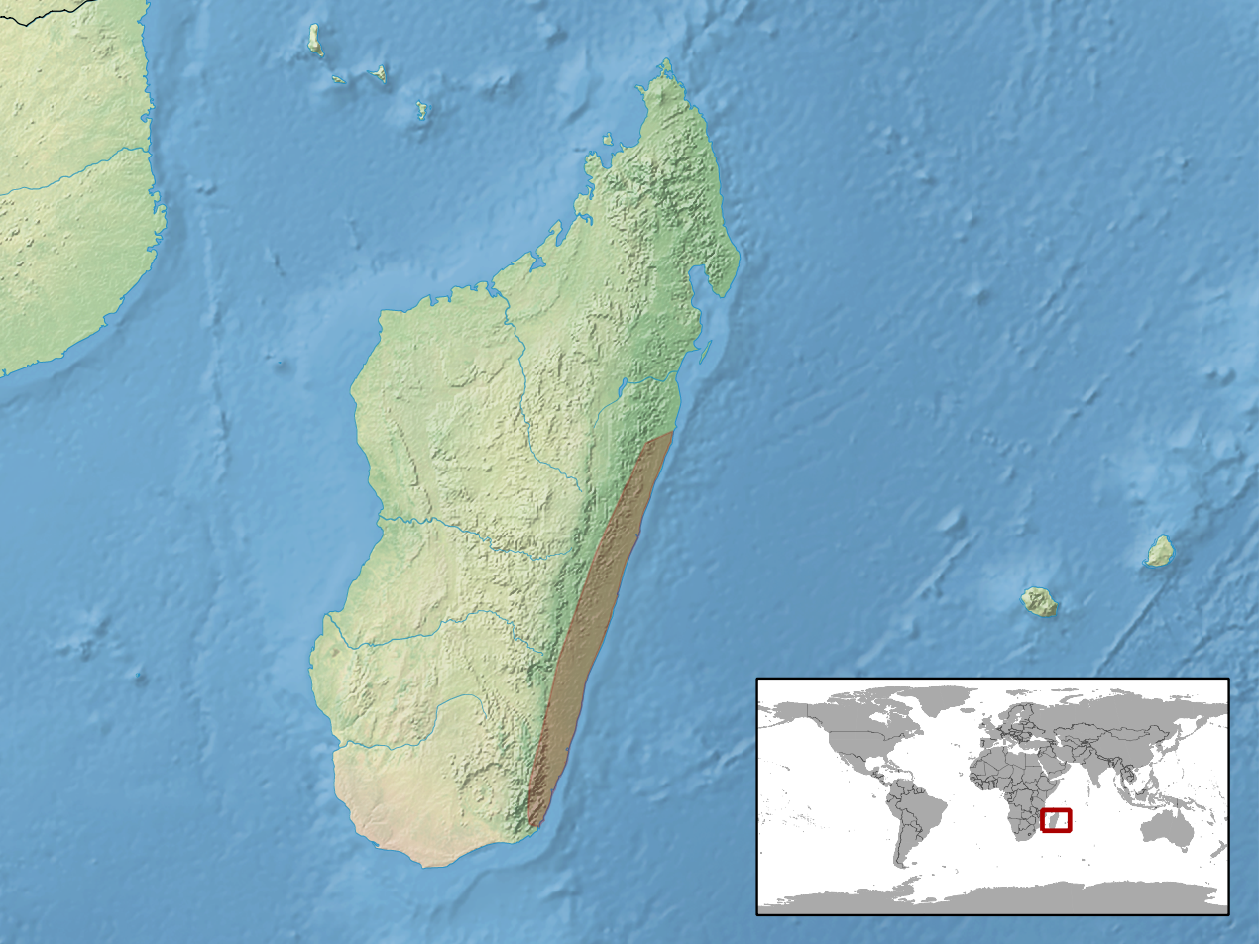

Synonyms
- Phelsuma quadriocellata parva Meier, 1983

= Phelsuma parva =

Species of lizard

Phelsuma parva is a species of gecko endemic to southeastern Madagascar.
