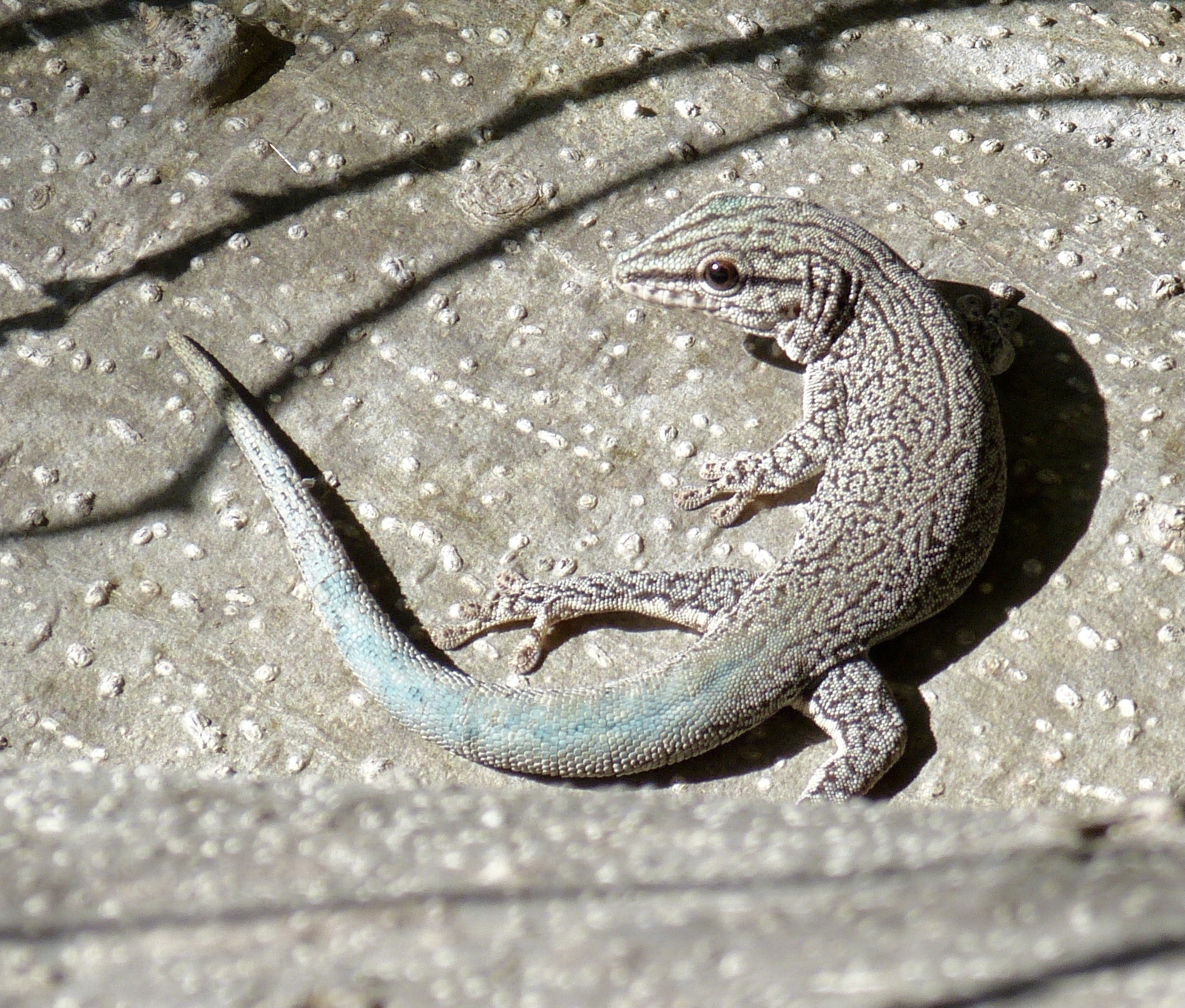

Conservation status
- Data Deficient (IUCN 3.1)

Scientific classification
- Kingdom: Animalia
- Phylum: Chordata
- Class: Reptilia
- Order: Squamata
- Suborder: Gekkota
- Family: Gekkonidae
- Genus: Phelsuma
- Species: P. gouldi

Binomial name
- Phelsuma gouldi Crottini, Gehring, Glaw, Harris, Lima & Vences, 2011
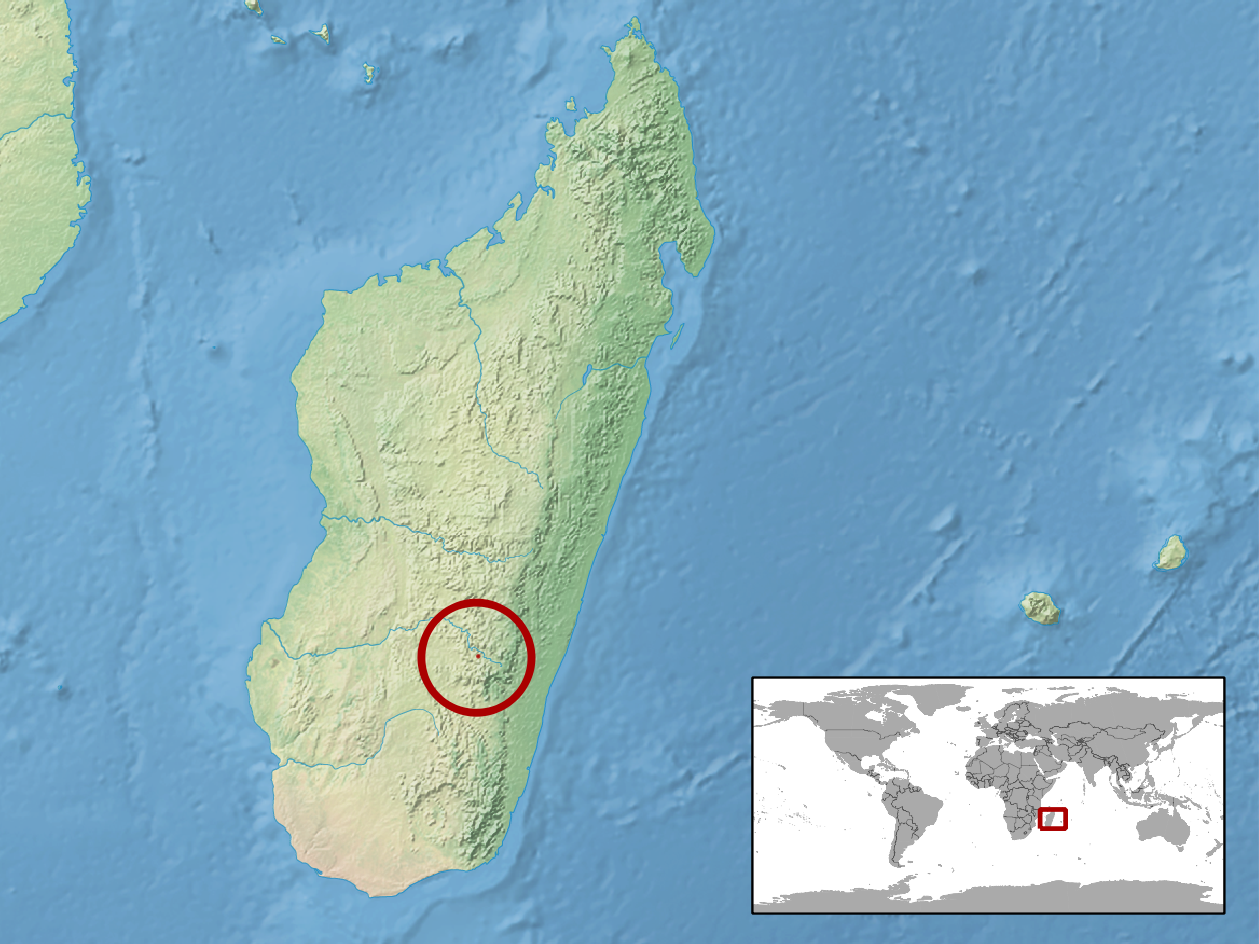

= Phelsuma gouldi =

Species of lizard

Phelsuma gouldi is a species of gecko endemic to Haute Matsiatra region of Madagascar.
