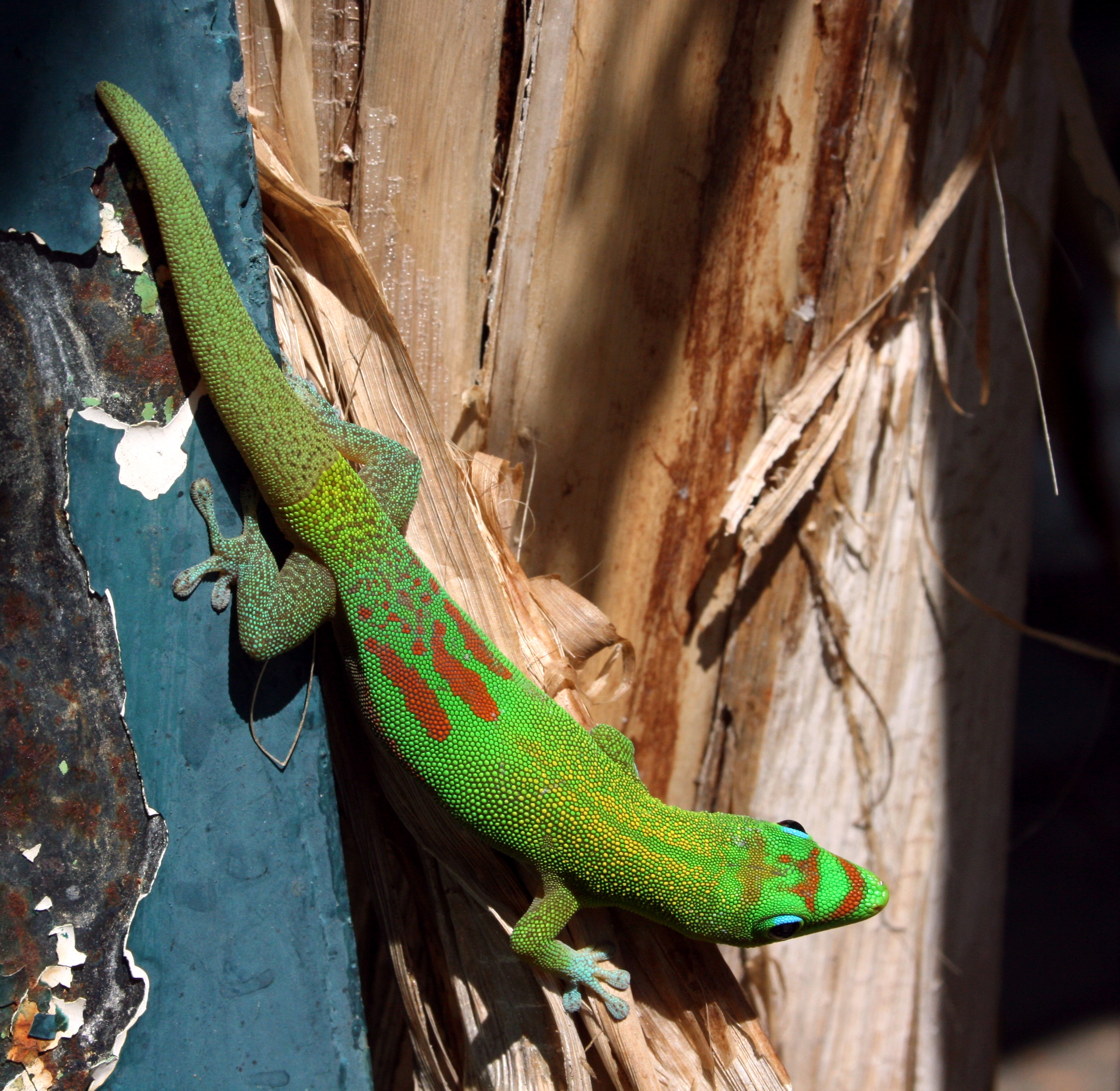
- Gold dust day gecko, Phelsuma laticauda

Scientific classification
- Kingdom: Animalia
- Phylum: Chordata
- Class: Reptilia
- Order: Squamata
- Suborder: Gekkota
- Family: Gekkonidae
- Subfamily: Uroplatinae
- Genus: Phelsuma; Gray, 1825

Species
- 53 species; see text

= Phelsuma =

Genus of lizards

Phelsuma is a large genus of geckos in the family Gekkonidae. Species in the genus Phelsuma are commonly referred to as day geckos.

Some day geckos are seriously endangered and some are common, but all Phelsuma species are CITES Appendix II listed. Little is known about trade in day geckos, but the IUCN considers it a threat to some species. Some species are captive-bred.

== Taxonomy ==
The genus itself is thought to have originated anywhere between the Late Cretaceous to the mid-Eocene (43 to 75 mya), as that is when its lineage is known to have diverged from the one containing the Namaqua day gecko (Rhoptropella), although it is unknown how closely related both genera are. The crown group containing all recent species is thought to have originated in the early Oligocene, about 30 million years ago, with the most basal of them being the isolated Andaman day gecko (P. andamanensis), which diverged from all other species shortly after the crown group originated. Most of the other divergence among species in areas of the Western Indian Ocean such as the Seychelles is thought to have occurred in the Neogene.

== Description ==
In contrast to most other gecko species, day geckos of the genus Phelsuma are active mainly during the day. Other diurnal geckos include species of the genera Lygodactylus and Gonatodes. Like most other geckos, day geckos lack eyelids, instead having rounded pupils and a clear, fixed plate covering their eyes which they clean with their tongues. Many species have bright green, red, and blue colors which make them popular terrarium or vivarium pets. These brilliant colors play a role in intraspecies recognition and also serve as camouflage.

The total length (including tail) of the different Phelsuma species varies between about 6.5 and 30 centimetres (2.6 and 11.8 in), but the extinct Rodrigues giant day gecko was even larger. Day geckos have toe pads consisting of tiny lamellae which allow them to walk on plain vertical and inverted surfaces like bamboo or glass. The inner toe on each foot is vestigial. Males have well-developed femoral pores on the undersurface of their rear limbs. These pores are less developed or absent in females. Females often have well-developed endolymphatic chalk sacs on the sides of their necks. These sacs store calcium, which is needed for egg production. Those eggs can often be seen through the ventral surface of the female's body shortly before they are laid. The hatchlings reach sexual maturity between six and 12 months old. Smaller species may live up to 10 years, whereas the larger species have been reported to live more than 20 years in captivity.

== Distribution and habitat ==
Day geckos inhabit the islands of the south-west part of the Indian Ocean. The exceptions are Phelsuma andamanense, which is endemic to the Andaman Islands in the Bay of Bengal, and Phelsuma dubia, which is also found on the East Coast of mainland Africa, although it possibly was introduced there. Most Phelsumas species are found in Mauritius and Madagascar. Some species are found on neighboring island groups, including the Mascarenes, Seychelles, and Comoros. Due to human introduction, they are also often found on some of the Hawaiian Islands, including the Big Island, Maui and Kauai, and the state of Florida, where they were introduced as a form of pest control. The different Phelsuma species can be found from sea level up to 2,300 meters. Most day geckos are arboreal. They inhabit, amongst others, coconut palms and banana trees, but can also be found near human settlements, in gardens, on fences, houses, and huts. An exception, Phelsuma barbouri, is a terrestrial species.

== Diet ==
Day geckos feed on various insects and other invertebrates in the wild. They also eat nectar, pollen, and occasionally soft, ripe and sweet fruits such as bananas.

In captivity, such a diet is simulated. Insects which may be used include: (wingless) fruit flies, various flies, wax moths, crickets, small super worms, small butter worms and mealworms. Fruit, which is required a few times a week, may be small pieces of papaya, banana, or other sweet fruit and also commercial gecko nectars.

In 2008 a BBC film crew took footage of a day gecko successfully begging a planthopper for honeydew.

== Etymology ==
The genus Phelsuma was first described in 1825 by the British zoologist John Edward Gray, who named it after the Dutch physician Murk van Phelsum.

== Classification ==
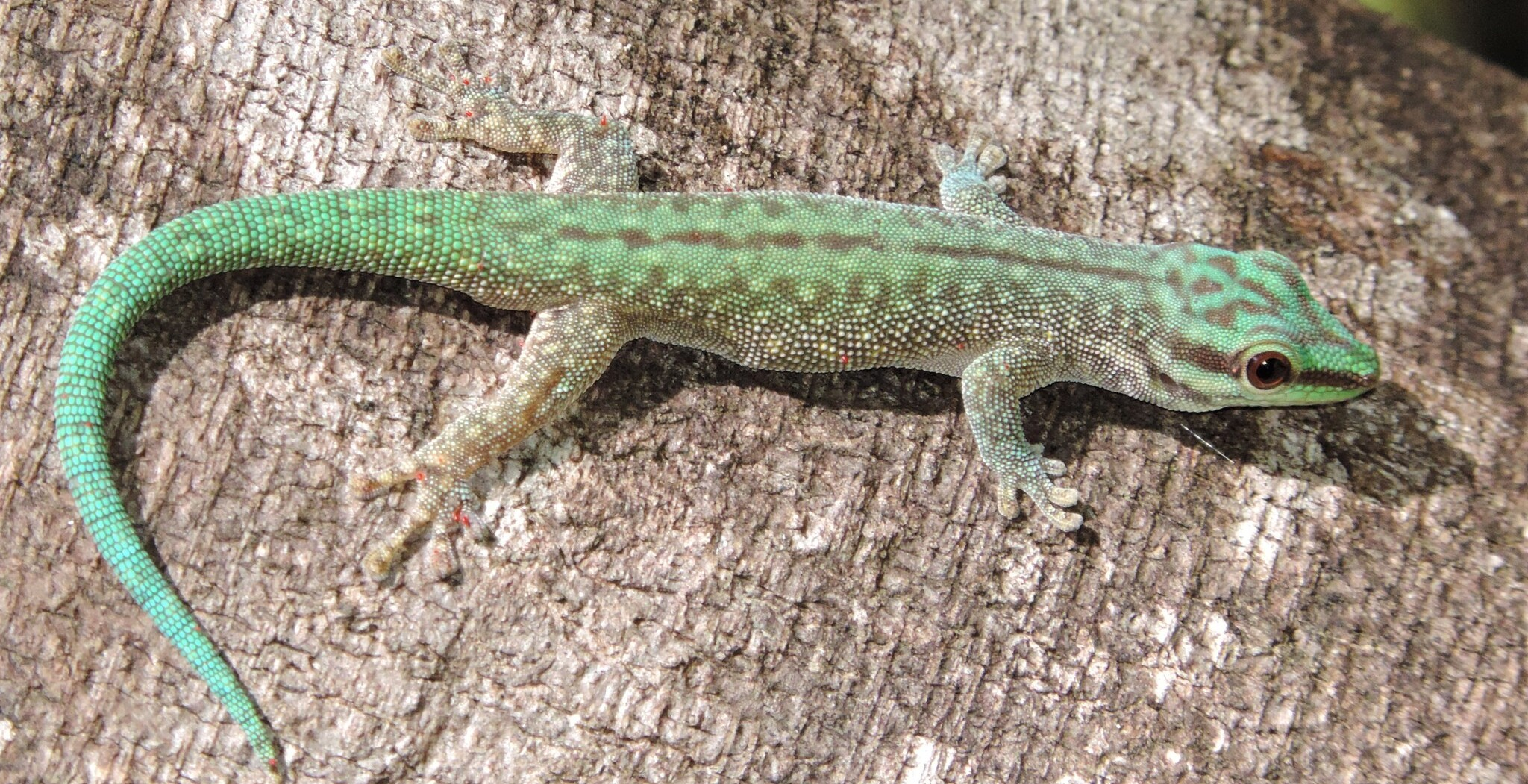
Cheke's day gecko (P. abbotti chekei)

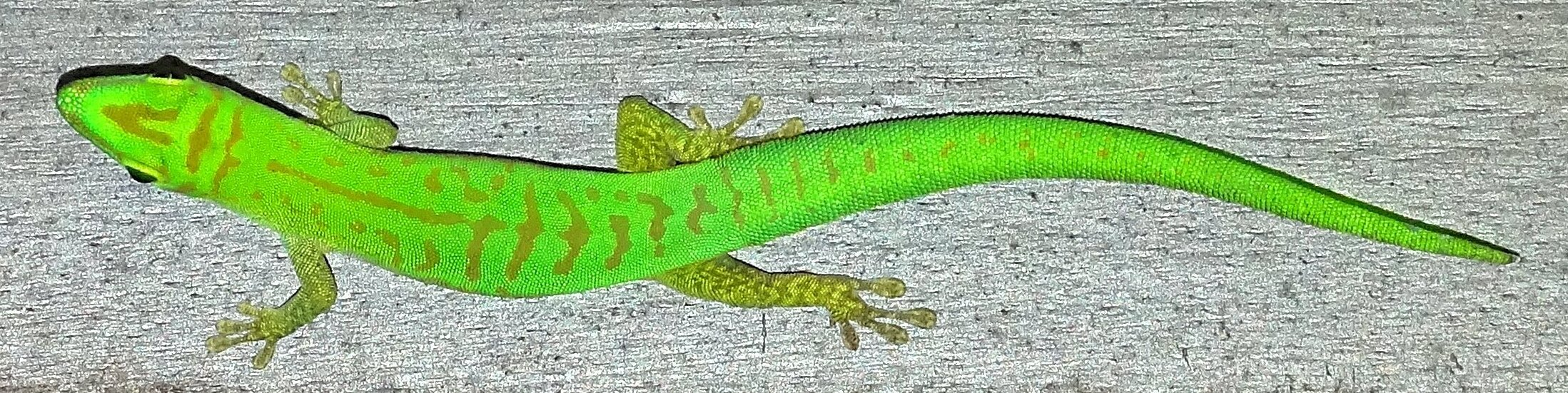
Seychelles small day gecko (P. astriata astriata)

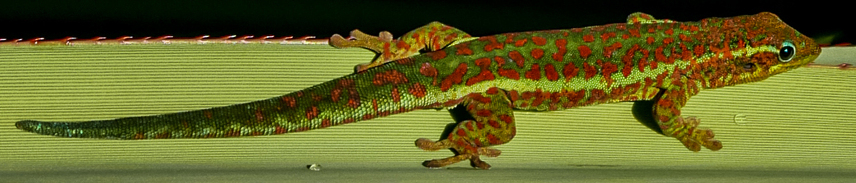
Reunion Island day gecko (P. borbonicaca)

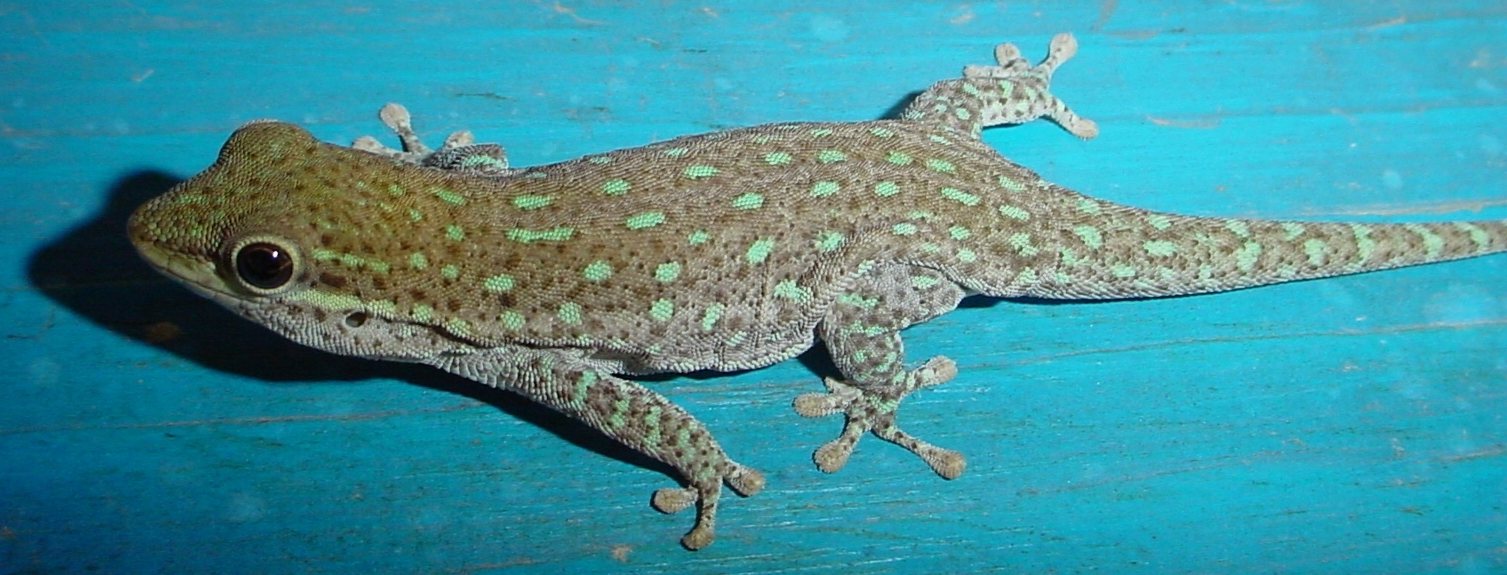
Short-headed day gecko (P. breviceps)

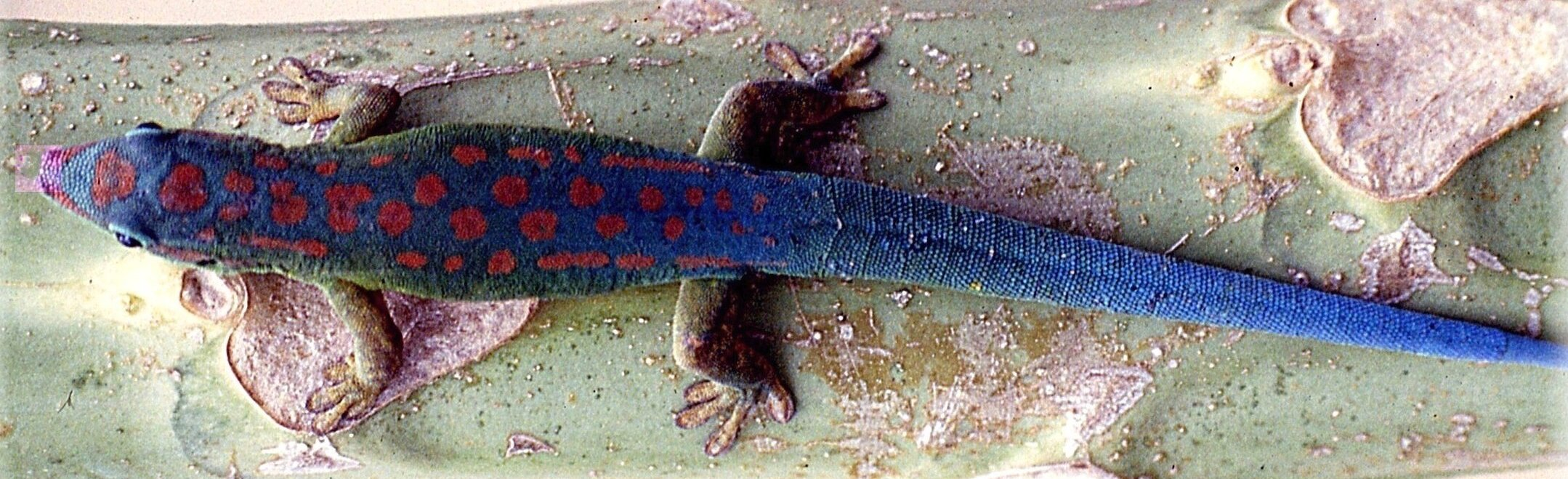
Blue-tailed day gecko (P. cepediana)

The genus consists of about 70 known species and subspecies.

Two Phelsuma species (Phelsuma gigas and Phelsuma edwardnewtoni), both of which were endemic to the Mascarene island of Rodrigues, are now considered to be extinct, probably due to the destruction of their environments by human settlers and their domestic animals. Many day gecko species are endangered today for similar reasons: an increasing percentage of their natural habitat, especially tropical forest, is being destroyed by human activity.

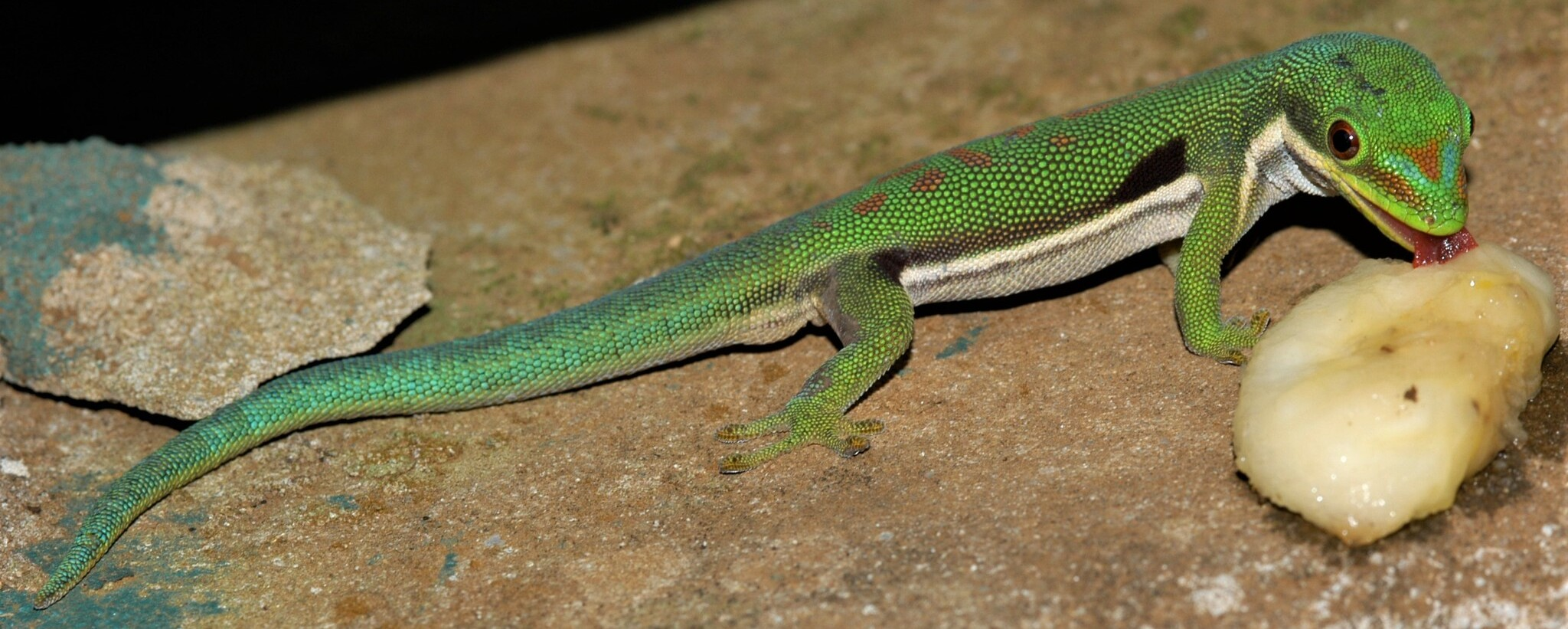
- Striped day gecko (P. dorsivittata)
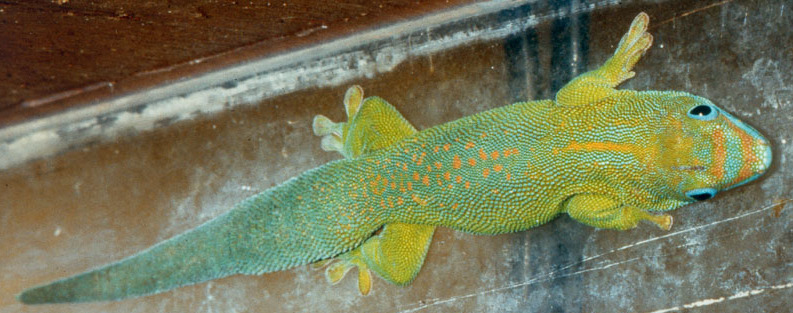
  Yellow-throated day gecko (P. flavigularis)
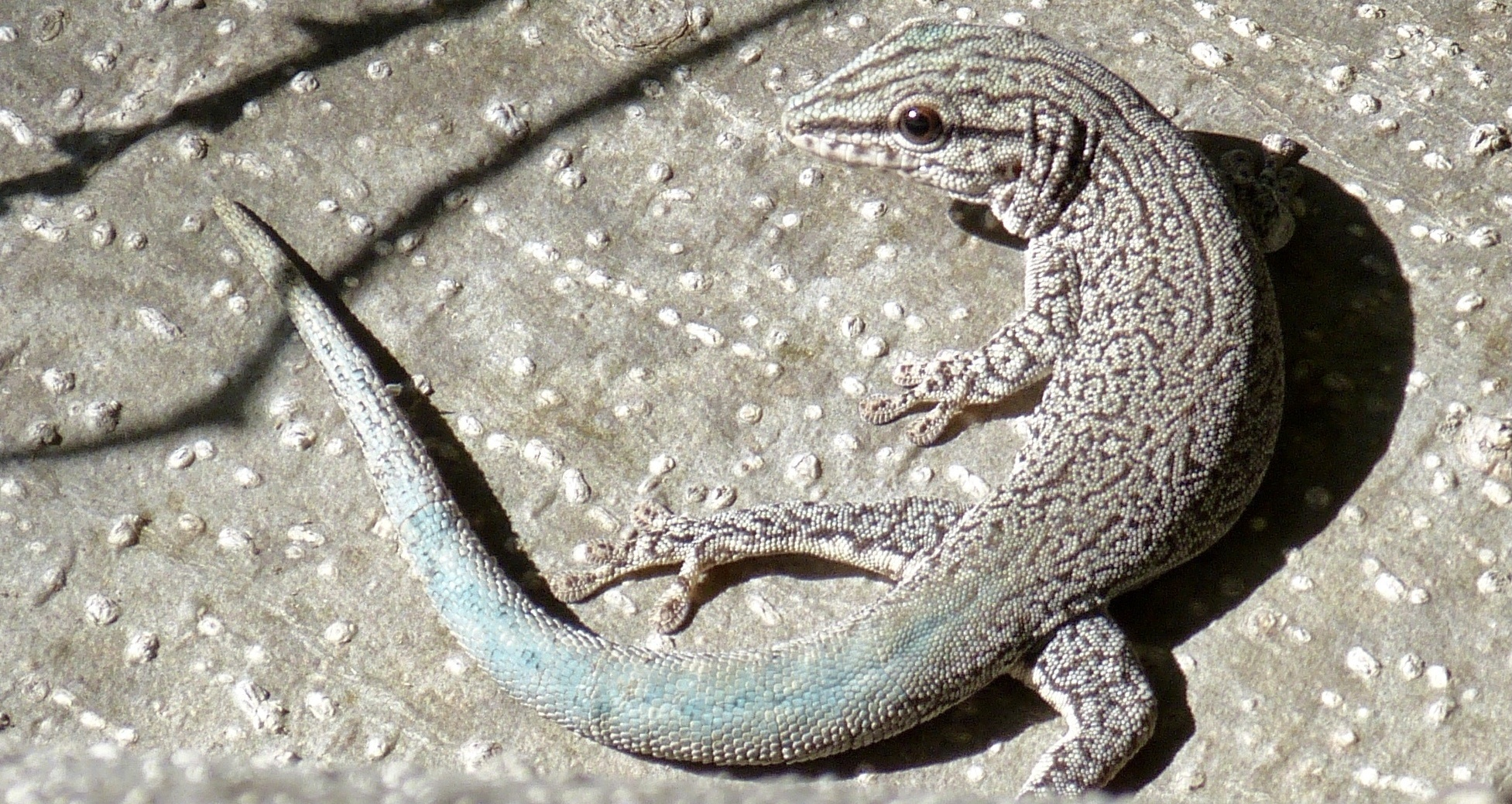
  Anja day gecko (P. gouldi)
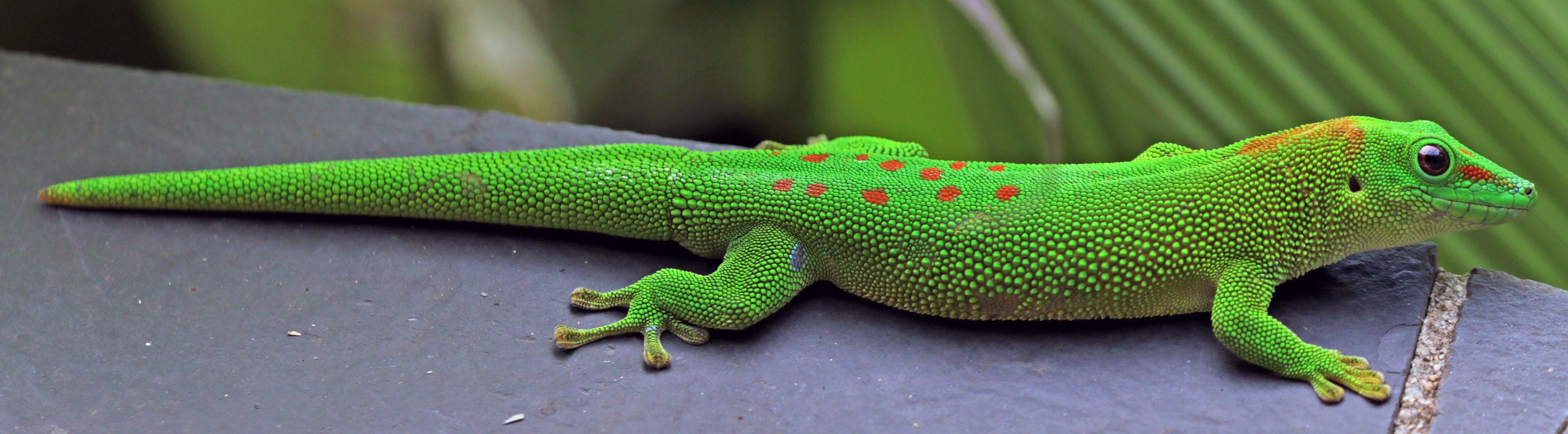
  Madagascar giant day gecko (P. grandis)
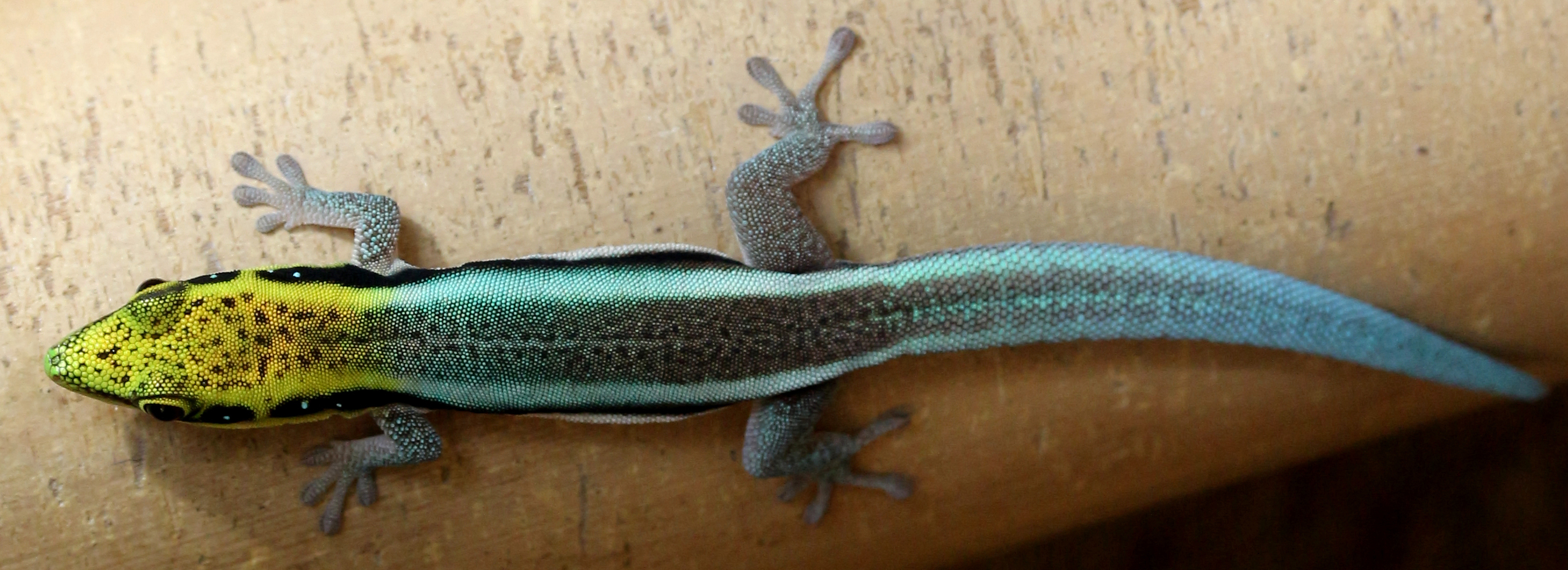
  Yellow-headed day gecko (P. klemmeri)
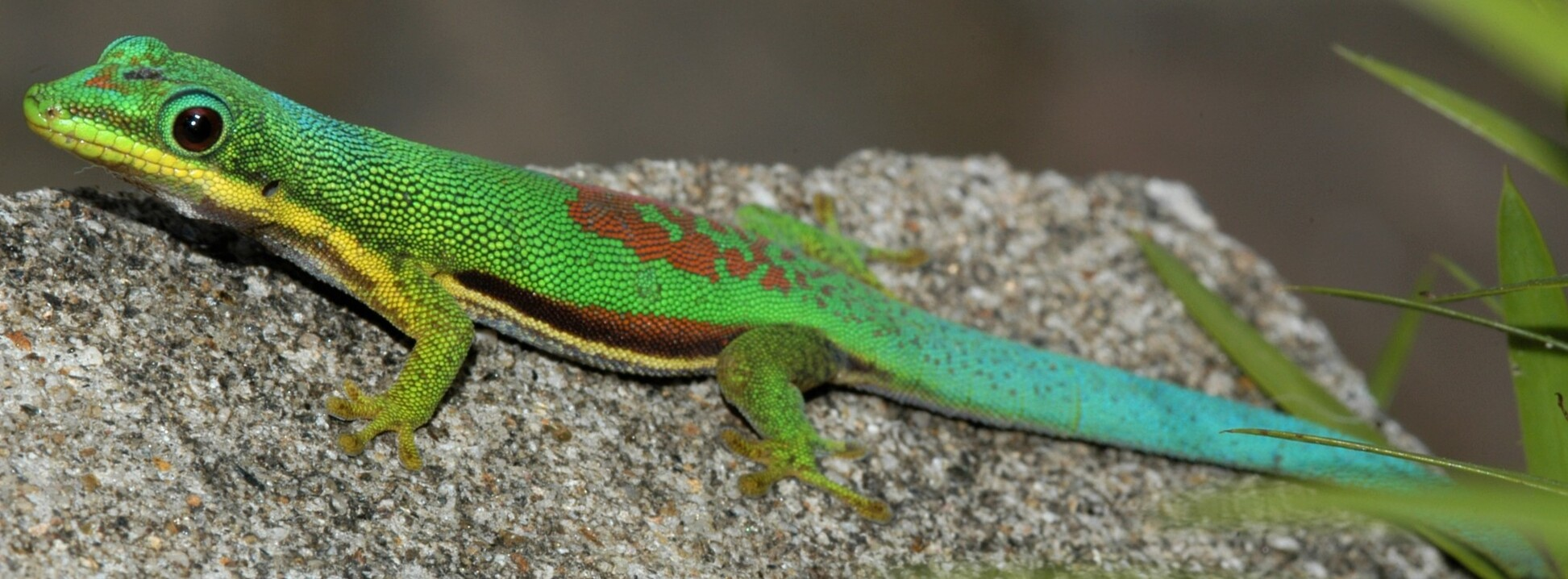
  Lined day gecko (P. lineata)
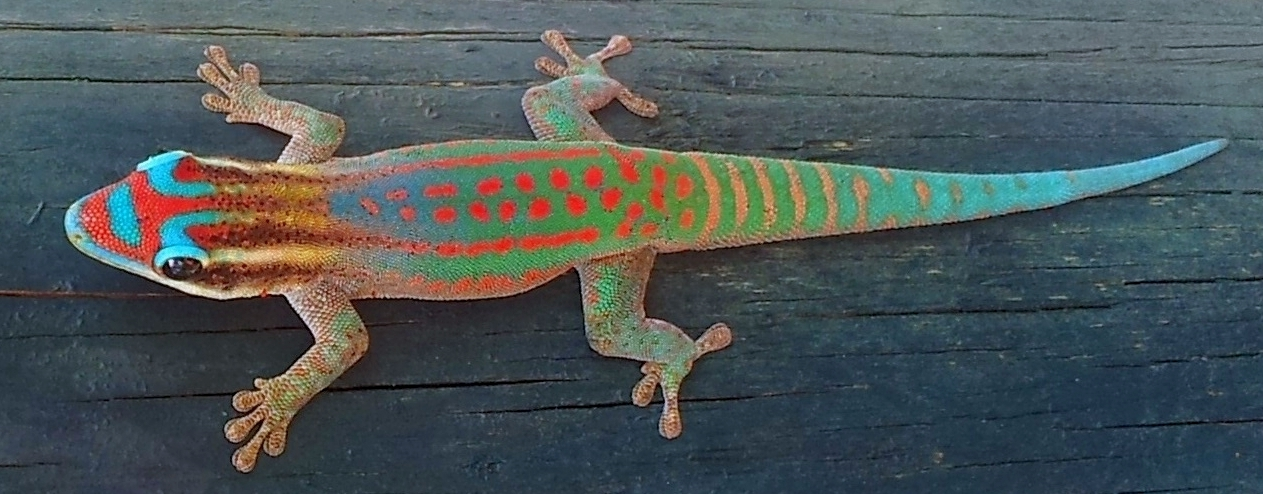
  Mauritius ornate day gecko (P. ornata)
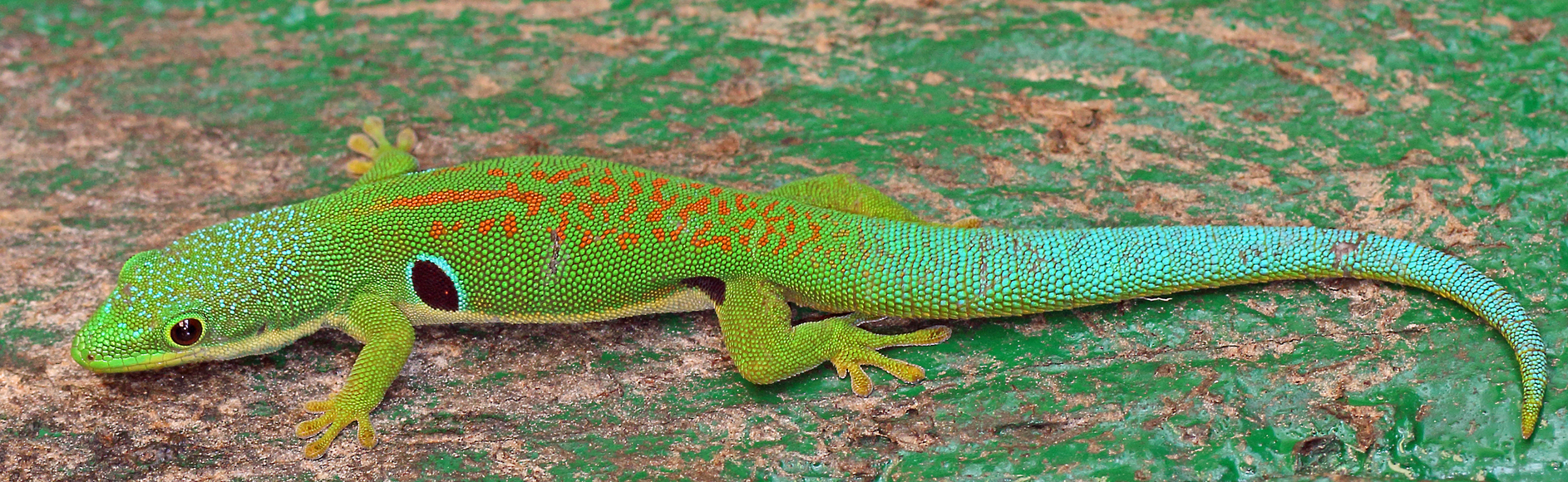
  Peacock day gecko (P. quadriocellata)
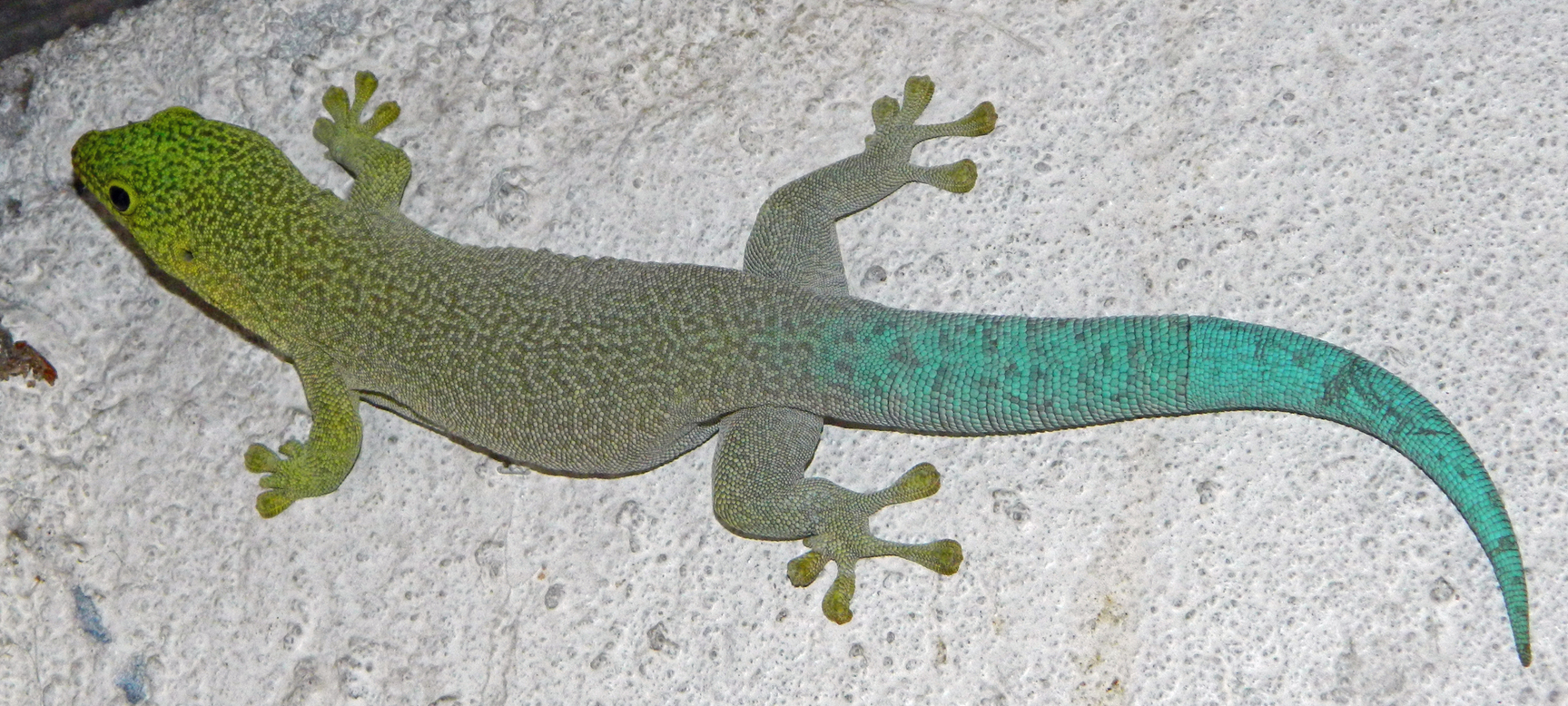
  Standing's day gecko (P. standingi)
  Phelsuma abbotti Stejneger, 1893
  - Phelsuma abbotti abbotti Stejneger, 1893 – Aldabra Island day gecko
  - Phelsuma abbotti chekei Börner & Minuth, 1984 – Cheke's day gecko
  - Phelsuma abbotti sumptio Cheke, 1982 – Assumption Island day gecko
- Phelsuma andamanensis Blyth, 1861 – Andaman Islands day gecko
- Phelsuma antanosy Raxworthy & Nussbaum, 1993
- Phelsuma astriata Tornier, 1901 – Seychelles day gecko
  - Phelsuma astriata astovei V. FitzSimons, 1948
  - Phelsuma astriata astriata Tornier, 1901 – Seychelles small day gecko
  - Phelsuma astriata semicarinata Cheke, 1982
- Phelsuma barbouri Loveridge, 1942 – Barbour's day gecko
- Phelsuma berghofi Krüger, 1996
- Phelsuma borai Glaw, J. Köhler & Vences, 2009
- Phelsuma borbonica Mertens, 1966
  - Phelsuma borbonica agalegae Cheke, 1975 – Agalega day gecko
  - Phelsuma borbonica borbonica Mertens, 1966 – Reunion Island day gecko
  - Phelsuma borbonica mater Meier, 1995
- Phelsuma breviceps Boettger, 1894
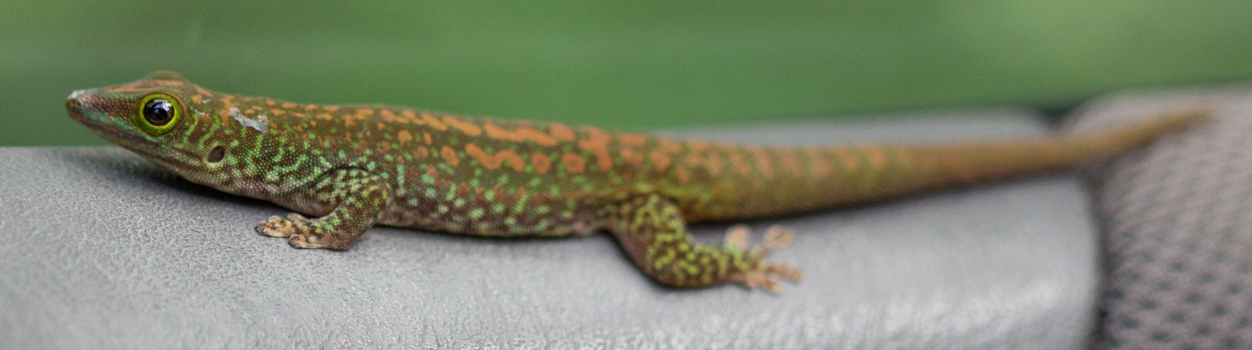
- Mahé day gecko (P. sundbergi longinsulae)
  Phelsuma cepediana (Milbert, 1812) – blue-tailed day gecko
- Phelsuma comorensis Boettger, 1913
- Phelsuma dorsivittata Mertens, 1964
- Phelsuma dubia (Boettger, 1881) – dull day gecko, Zanzibar day gecko
- †Phelsuma edwardnewtoni J. Vinson & J.-M. Vinson, 1969 – Rodrigues day gecko (extinct, last seen 1917)
- Phelsuma flavigularis Mertens, 1962 – yellow-throated day gecko
- †Phelsuma gigas Liénard, 1842 – Rodrigues giant day gecko (extinct, last seen 1842)
- Phelsuma gouldi Crottini et al., 2011
- Phelsuma grandis Gray, 1870 – Madagascar giant day gecko
- Phelsuma guentheri Boulenger, 1885 – Round Island day gecko
- Phelsuma guimbeaui Mertens, 1963 – orange-spotted day gecko, Mauritius lowland forest day gecko
- Phelsuma guttata Kaudern, 1922 – speckled day gecko
- Phelsuma hielscheri Rösler, Obst & Seipp, 2001
- Phelsuma hoeschi Berghof & Trautmann, 2009
- Phelsuma inexpectata Mertens, 1966 – Reunion Island ornate day gecko
- Phelsuma kely Schönecker, Bach & Glaw, 2004
- Phelsuma klemmeri Seipp, 1991 – yellow-headed day gecko
- Phelsuma kochi Mertens, 1954 – Koch's day gecko, Koch's giant day gecko, Madagascar day gecko, Maevatanana day gecko
- Phelsuma laticauda (Boettger, 1880) – broad-tailed day gecko
  - Phelsuma laticauda angularis Mertens, 1964
  - Phelsuma laticauda laticauda (Boettger, 1880) – gold dust day gecko
- Phelsuma lineata Gray, 1842
  - Phelsuma lineata bombetokensis Mertens, 1964
  - Phelsuma lineata elanthana Krüger, 1996
  - Phelsuma lineata lineata Gray, 1842
- Phelsuma madagascariensis Gray, 1831
  - Phelsuma madagascariensis boehmei Meier, 1982 – Boehme's giant day gecko
  - Phelsuma madagascariensis madagascariensis Gray, 1831 – Madagascar day gecko
- Phelsuma malamakibo Nussbaum et al., 2000
- Phelsuma masohoala Raxworthy & Nussbaum, 1994
- Phelsuma modesta Mertens, 1970 – modest day gecko
  - Phelsuma modesta leiogaster Mertens, 1963
  - Phelsuma modesta modesta Mertens, 1970
- Phelsuma mutabilis (Grandidier, 1869) – thicktail day gecko
- Phelsuma nigristriata Meier, 1984 – island day gecko
- Phelsuma ornata Gray, 1825 – Mauritius ornate day gecko
- Phelsuma parkeri Loveridge, 1941 – Pemba Island day gecko
- Phelsuma parva Meier, 1983
- Phelsuma pasteuri Meier, 1984 – Pasteur's day gecko
- Phelsuma pronki Seipp, 1994
- Phelsuma punctulata Mertens, 1970 – striped day gecko
- Phelsuma pusilla Mertens, 1964
  - Phelsuma pusilla hallmanni Meier, 1989 – Hallmann's day gecko
  - Phelsuma pusilla pusilla Mertens, 1964
- Phelsuma quadriocellata W. Peters, 1883 – peacock day gecko
  - Phelsuma quadriocellata quadriocellata W. Peters, 1883 – four-spotted day gecko
  - Phelsuma quadriocellata bimaculata Kaudern, 1922
  - Phelsuma quadriocellata lepida Krüger, 1993
- Phelsuma ravenala Raxworthy et al., 2007
- Phelsuma robertmertensi Meier, 1980 – Robert Mertens's day gecko
- Phelsuma roesleri Glaw et al., 2010
- Phelsuma rosagularis J. Vinson & J.-M. Vinson, 1969 – Mauritius upland forest day gecko
- Phelsuma seippi Meier, 1987 – Seipp's day gecko
- Phelsuma serraticauda Mertens, 1963 – flat-tailed day gecko
- Phelsuma standingi Methuen & Hewitt, 1913 – Standing's day gecko
- Phelsuma sundbergi Rendahl, 1939 – Praslin Island day gecko
  - Phelsuma sundbergi ladiguensis Böhme & Meier, 1981 – La Digue day gecko
  - Phelsuma sundbergi longinsulae Rendahl, 1939 – Mahé day gecko
  - Phelsuma sundbergi sundbergi Rendahl, 1939 – Seychelles giant day gecko
- Phelsuma vanheygeni Lerner, 2000
- Phelsuma v-nigra Boettger, 1913 – Indian day gecko
  - Phelsuma v-nigra anjouanensis Meier, 1986 – Anjouan Island day gecko
  - Phelsuma v-nigra comoraegrandensis Meier, 1986 – Grand Comoro day gecko
  - Phelsuma v-nigra v-nigra Boettger, 1913

Nota bene: A binomial authority or trinomial authority in parentheses indicates that the species or subspecies was originally described in a genus other than Phelsuma.
