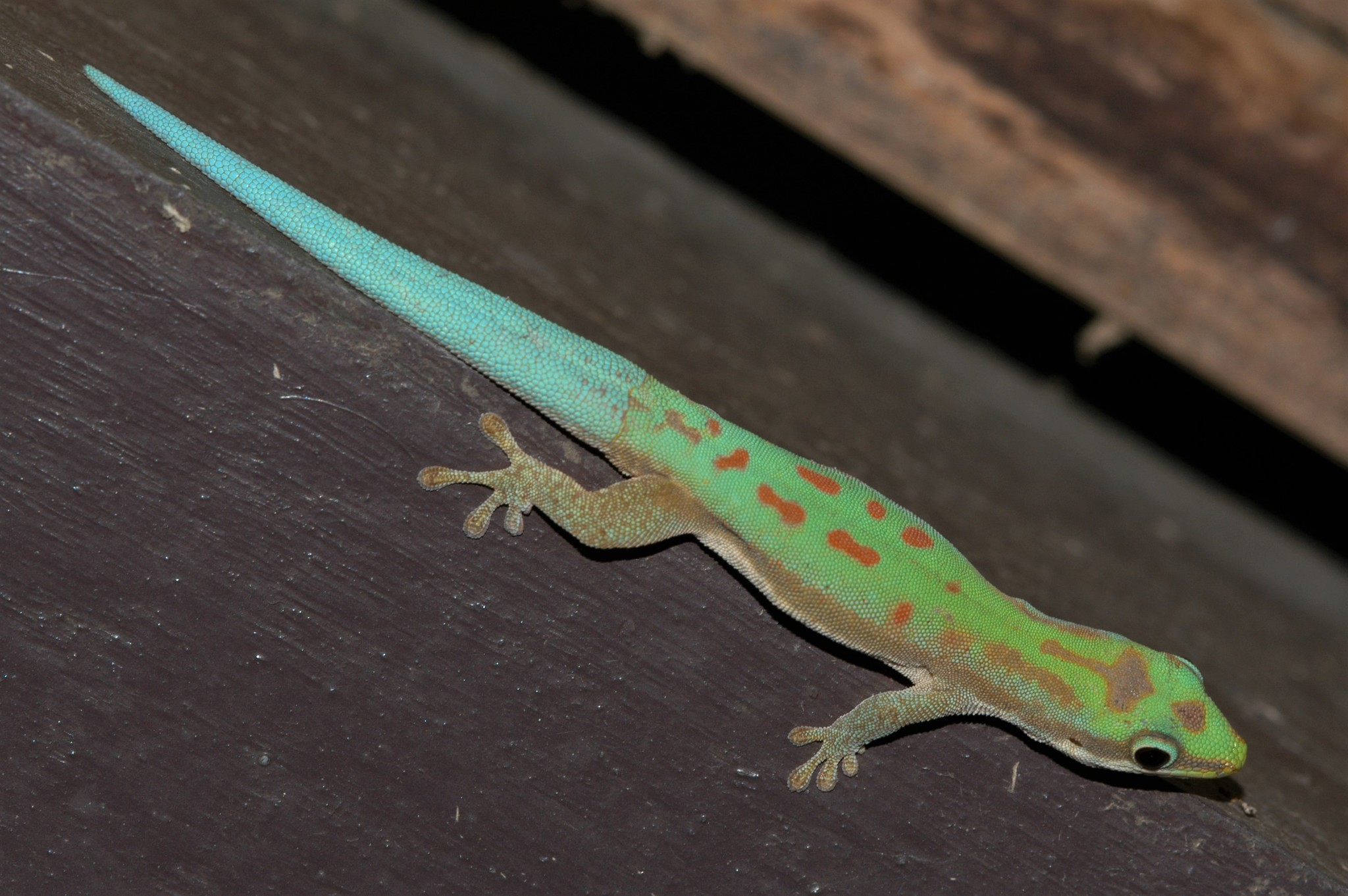

Conservation status
- Least Concern (IUCN 3.1)

Scientific classification
- Kingdom: Animalia
- Phylum: Chordata
- Class: Reptilia
- Order: Squamata
- Suborder: Gekkota
- Family: Gekkonidae
- Genus: Phelsuma
- Species: P. modesta

Binomial name
- Phelsuma modesta Mertens, 1970
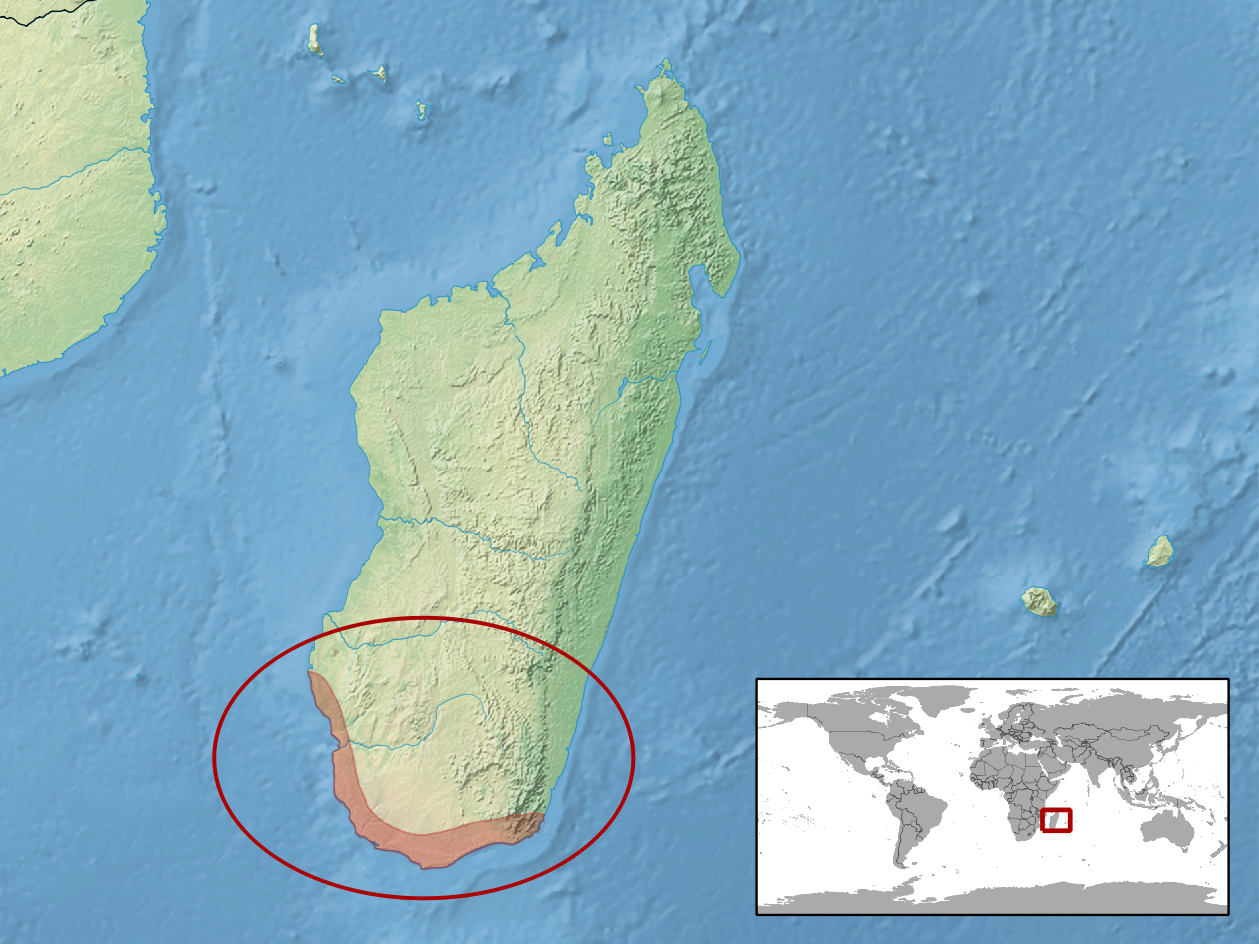

Synonyms
- Phelsuma lineata leiogaster Mertens, 1973; Phelsuma leiogaster Mertens, 1973; Phelsuma leiogaster trautmanni Meier, 1993; Phelsuma leiogaster isakae Meier, 1993; Phelsuma modesta isakae Meier, 1993

= Phelsuma modesta =

Species of lizard

Phelsuma modesta, commonly known as the modest day gecko, is a species of gecko found in Madagascar.

== Subspecies ==
Subspecies	Image
Phelsuma modesta leiogaster Mertens, 1963	
Phelsuma modesta modesta Mertens, 1970	
