= Phelsuma berghofi =

Conservation status
- Near Threatened (IUCN 3.1)

Scientific classification
- Kingdom: Animalia
- Phylum: Chordata
- Class: Reptilia
- Order: Squamata
- Suborder: Gekkota
- Family: Gekkonidae
- Genus: Phelsuma
- Species: P. berghofi

Binomial name
- Phelsuma berghofi Krüger, 1996
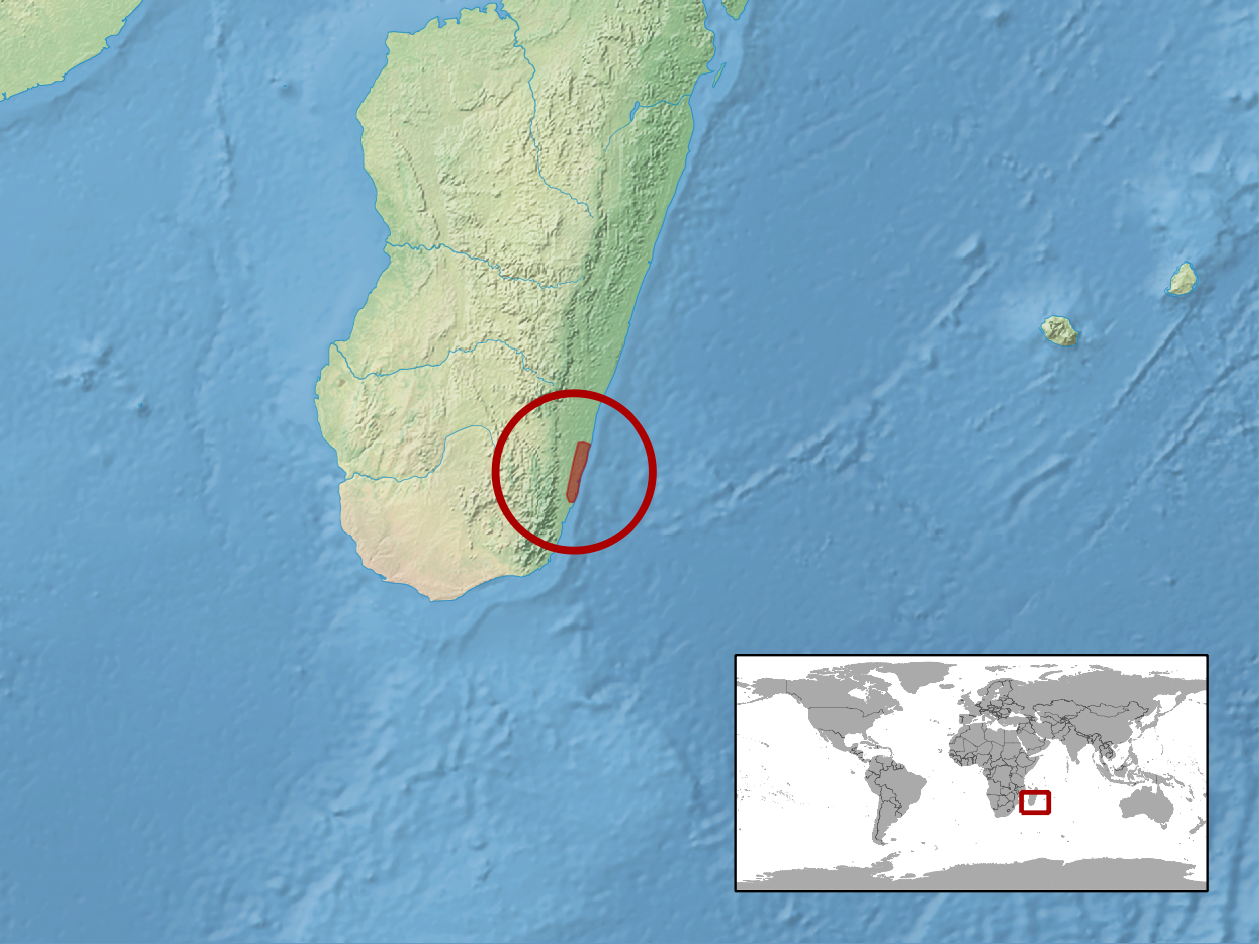

Species of lizard

Phelsuma berghofi is a species of gecko, a lizard in the family Gekkonidae. The species is endemic to Madagascar.

== Etymology ==
The specific name, berghofi, is in honor of German herpetologist Hans-Peter Berghof.

== Geographic range ==
P. berghofi is native to the Atsimo-Atsinanana region of southeastern Madagascar.

== Habitat ==
The preferred natural habitats of P. berghofi are grassland, savanna, and forest, at altitudes from sea level to about 50 m (160 ft).

== Description ==
A medium-sized species for its genus, P. berghofi may attain a total length (including tail) of 12 or 15 cm (4.7 or 5.9 in).

== Reproduction ==
P. berghofi is oviparous.
