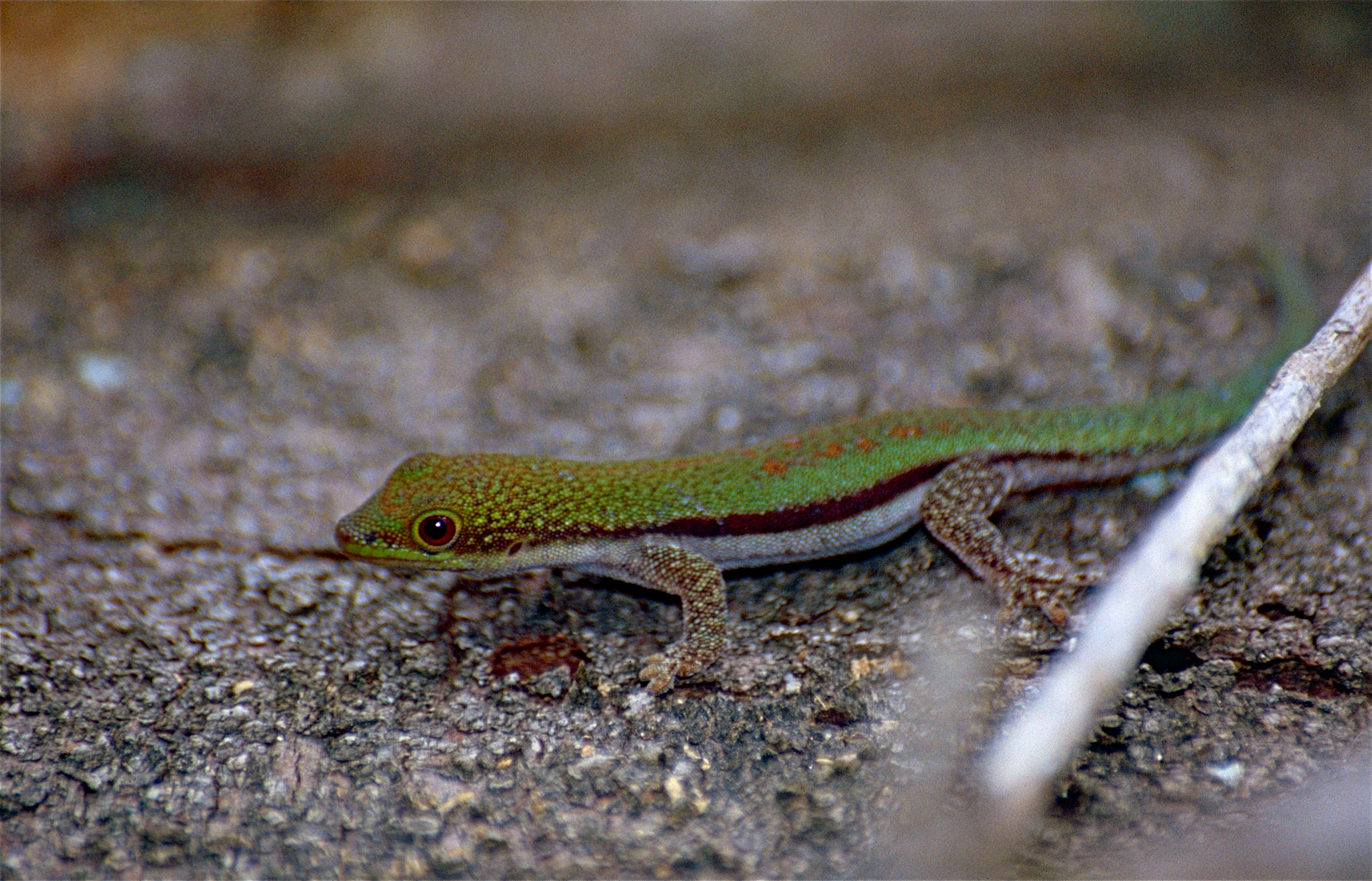

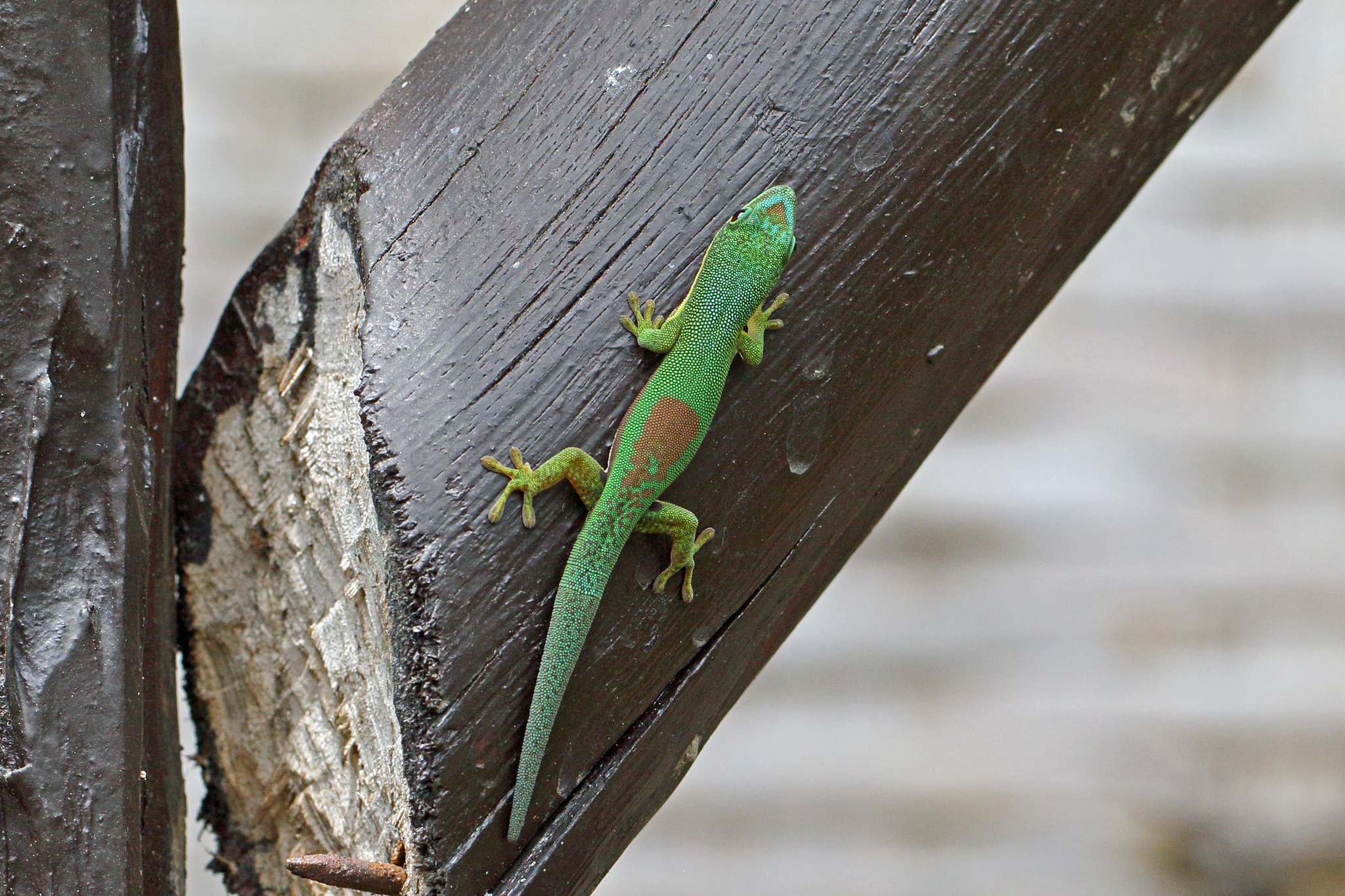

Conservation status
- Least Concern (IUCN 3.1)

Scientific classification
- Kingdom: Animalia
- Phylum: Chordata
- Class: Reptilia
- Order: Squamata
- Suborder: Gekkota
- Family: Gekkonidae
- Genus: Phelsuma
- Species: P. pusilla

Binomial name
- Phelsuma pusilla Mertens, 1964
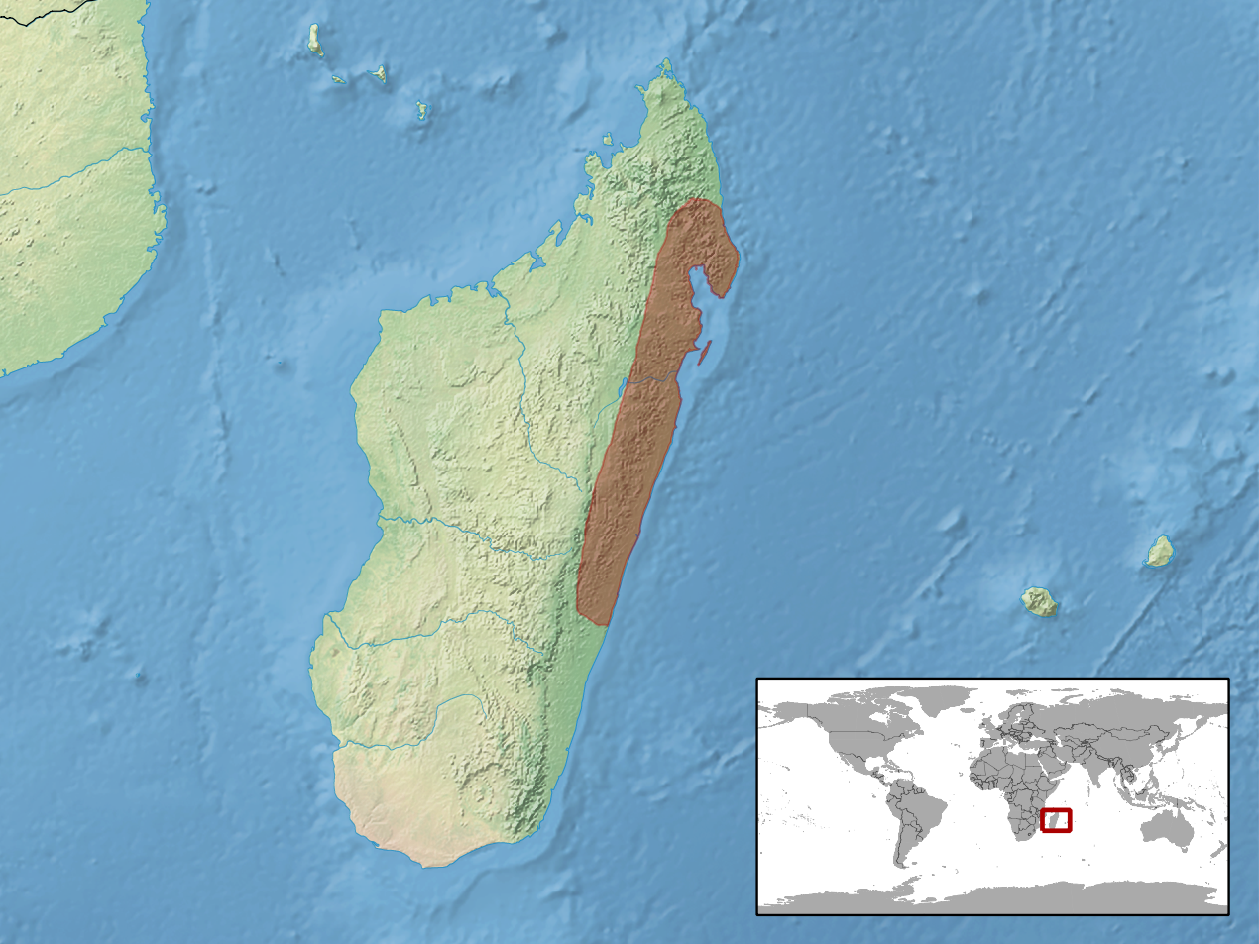

= Phelsuma pusilla =

Species of lizard

Phelsuma pusilla, the lesser day gecko, is a species of gecko found in Madagascar.
