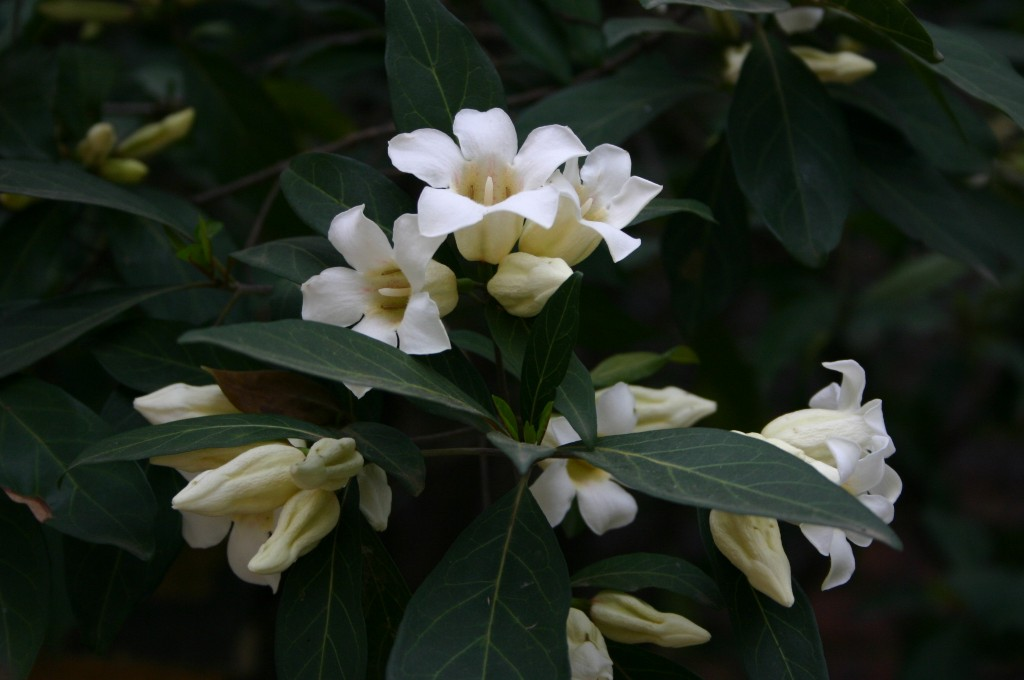
- Rothmannia globosa

Scientific classification
- Kingdom: Plantae
- Clade: Tracheophytes
- Clade: Angiosperms
- Clade: Eudicots
- Clade: Asterids
- Order: Gentianales
- Family: Rubiaceae
- Subfamily: Ixoroideae
- Tribe: Gardenieae
- Genus: Rothmannia; Thunb.

Type species
- Rothmannia capensis Thunb.

= Rothmannia =

Genus of flowering plants

Rothmannia is a genus of African flowering plants in the family Rubiaceae. It was described in 1776 and was named after Göran Rothman (1739–1778) by Thunberg – both were pupils of Linnaeus.

== Description ==
Although Rubiaceae flowers are generally organized in many-flowered inflorescences, solitary flowers are also found in this genus. The reduction of the number of flowers per inflorescence is often in inverse proportion to the size of the flowers, which explains the large solitary flowers of some Rothmannia.

== Distribution and species ==
The genus originally had wide distribution, but is now restricted to species found in tropical and southern Africa:

- Rothmannia annae (E.P. Wright) Keay
- Rothmannia capensis Thunb.
- Rothmannia ebamutensis Sonké
- Rothmannia engleriana (K.Schum.) Keay
- Rothmannia fischeri (K.Schum.) Bullock ex Oberm.
- Rothmannia globosa (Hochst.) Keay
- Rothmannia hispida (K.Schum.) Fagerl.
- Rothmannia jollyana N. Hallé
- Rothmannia lateriflora (K.Schum.) Keay
- Rothmannia libisa N. Hallé
- Rothmannia liebrechtsiana (De Wild. & T. Durand) Keay
- Rothmannia longiflora Salisb.
- Rothmannia lujae (De Wild.) Keay
- Rothmannia macrocarpa (Hiern) Keay
- Rothmannia macrosiphon (K.Schum.) Bridson
- Rothmannia manganjae (Hiern) Keay
- Rothmannia mayumbensis(R.D. Good) Keay
- Rothmannia munsae (Schweinf. ex Hiern) E.M.A. Petit
- Rothmannia octomera (Hook.) Fagerl.
- Rothmannia ravae (Chiov.) Bridson
- Rothmannia talbotii (Wernham) Keay
- Rothmannia urcelliformis (Hiern) Bullock ex Robyns
- Rothmannia whitfieldii (Lindl.) Dandy

=== Asian species moved to other genera ===
The species found in western Indian Ocean, southern China to Indo-China and New Guinea are now placed in other genera, especially Ridsdalea:

- R. attopevensis (Pit.) Bremek.
- R. daweishanensis Y.M. Shui & W.H. Chen
- R. eucodon (K.Schum.) Bremek.
- R. kampucheana Tirveng.
- R. kuchingensis (W.W.Sm.) K.M. Wong and R. malayana K.M. Wong are synonyms of Ridsdalea grandis (Korth.) J.T.Pereira
- R. macromera (Lauterb. & K.Schum.) Fagerl.
- R. merrillii (Elmer) J.T. Pereira & Ridsdale
- R. pulcherrima (Kurz) Tirveng.
- R. schoemannii (Teijsm. & Binn.) Tirveng.
- R. sootepensis (Craib) Bremek.
- R. thailandica Tirveng.
- R. uranthera (C.E.C. Fisch.) Tirveng.
- R. venalis Bremek.
- R. vidalii Bremek.
- R. vietnamensis Tirveng.
- R. wittii (Craib) Bremek.

Rothmannia macrophylla (Hook.f.) Bremek. is a synonym of Singaporandia macrophylla (Hook.f.) K.M.Wong
