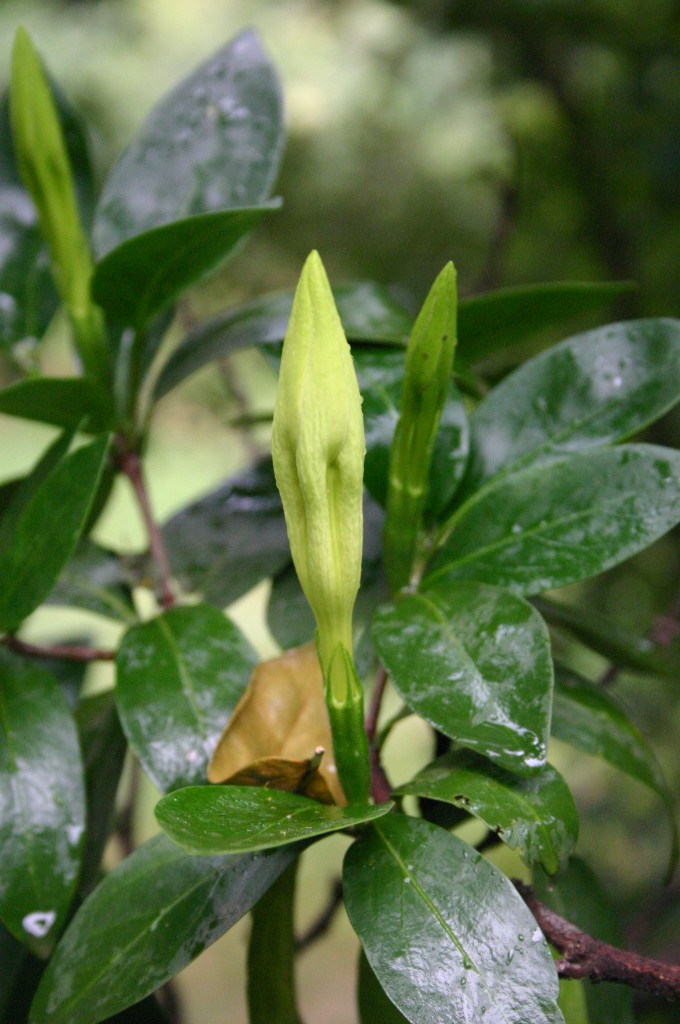

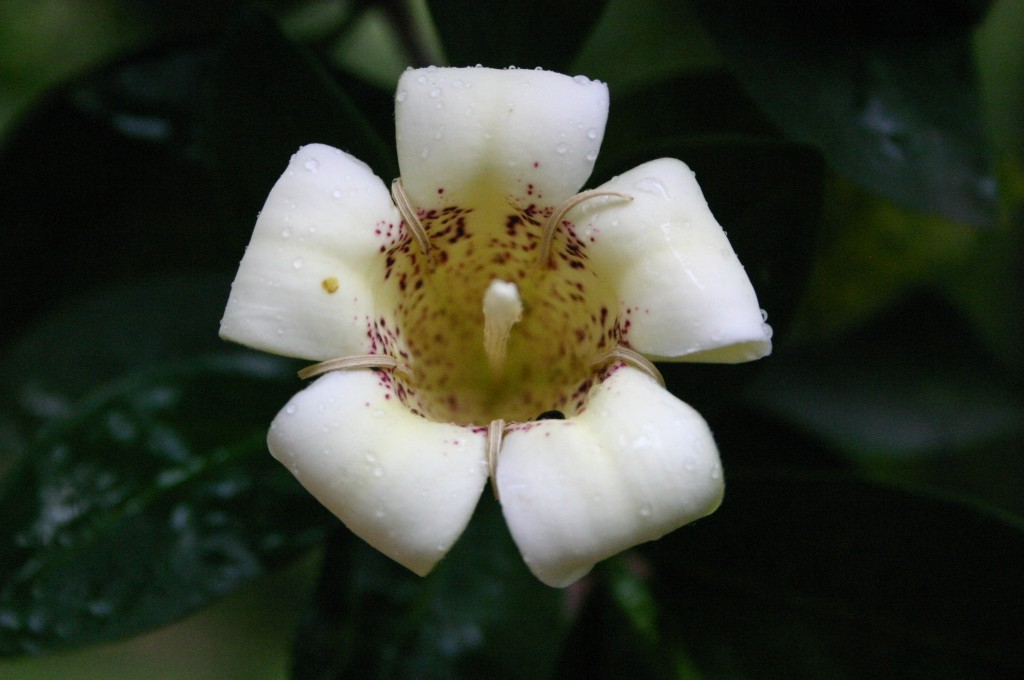

Scientific classification
- Kingdom: Plantae
- Clade: Tracheophytes
- Clade: Angiosperms
- Clade: Eudicots
- Clade: Asterids
- Order: Gentianales
- Family: Rubiaceae
- Genus: Rothmannia
- Species: R. capensis

Binomial name
- Rothmannia capensis Thunb.

Synonyms
- Genipa rothmannia (L.f.) Baill.

= Rothmannia capensis =

Species of plant

Rothmannia capensis is a South African tree belonging to the Rubiaceae, usually about 5 m high in the open, but reaching 20 m under forest conditions. It occurs from the south-western Cape Province along the coastal regions and inland to the Waterberg and Soutpansberg in the Transvaal. It is a common tree on the Witwatersrand in Johannesburg. It produces abundant sweetly fragrant flowers in summer, and these are followed by smooth, dark green spherical fruits about 80mm in diameter. The blackish bark has a distinctive rectangular pattern of fine cracks.

The genus was named for Göran Rothman (1739–1778) by Thunberg – both were pupils of Linnaeus.
