= FSSA =

FSSA may refer to:

- Fellow of the Scottish Society of Arts, see Royal Scottish Society of Arts
- Frank Sinatra School of the Arts, New York
- Family & Social Services Administration, Indiana
- Astove Island Airport, ICAO code FSSA
