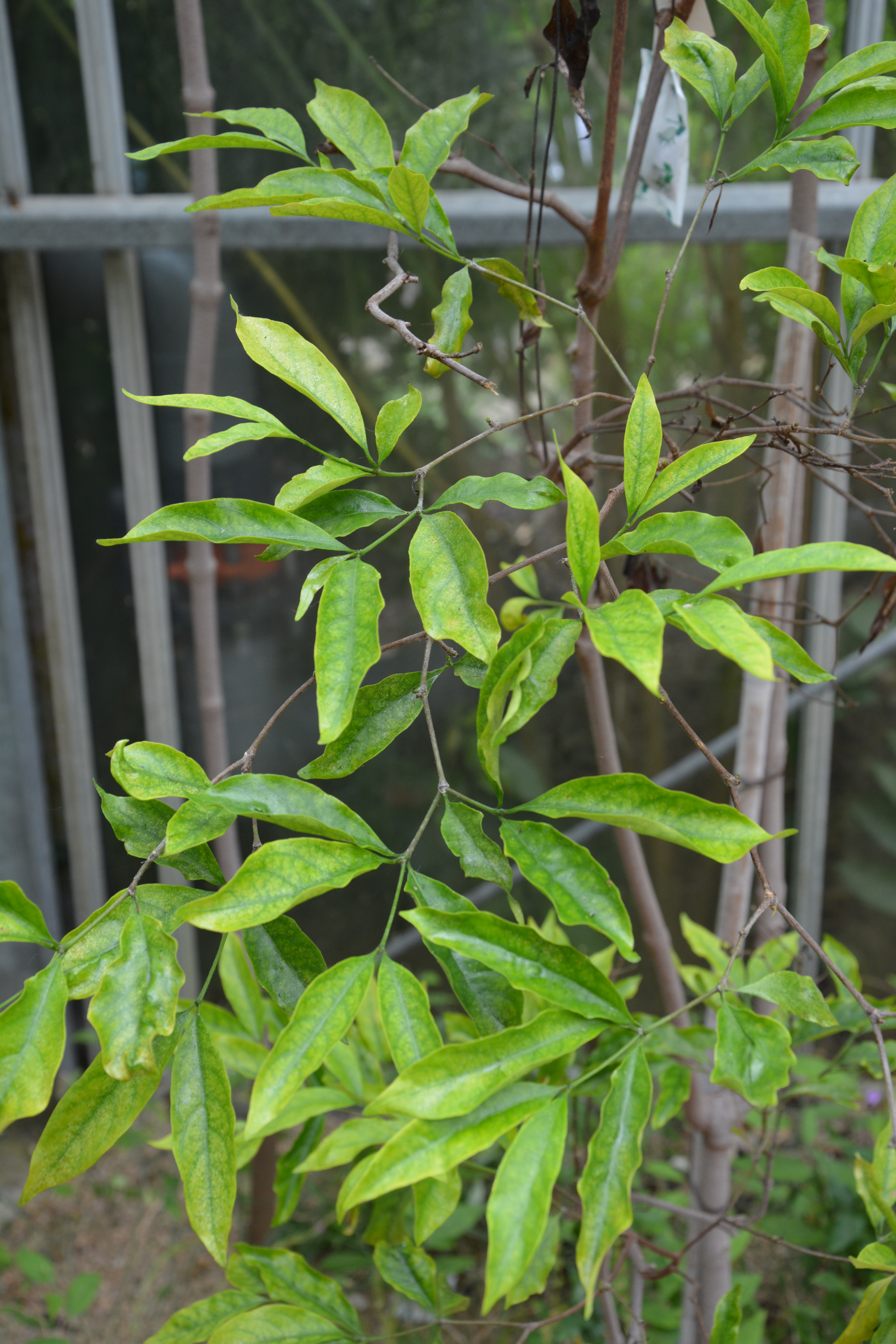
- Rothmannia annae - Conservatoire botanique national de Brest, (France)

Conservation status
- Critically Endangered (IUCN 3.1)

Scientific classification
- Kingdom: Plantae
- Clade: Embryophytes
- Clade: Tracheophytes
- Clade: Spermatophytes
- Clade: Angiosperms
- Clade: Eudicots
- Clade: Asterids
- Order: Gentianales
- Family: Rubiaceae
- Genus: Rothmannia
- Species: R. annae

Binomial name
- Rothmannia annae (E.P.Wright) Keay

SynonymsMref name=powo/>
- Gardenia annae E.P.Wright

= Rothmannia annae =

Species of plant

Rothmannia annae is a species of plant in the family Rubiaceae. It is endemic to the Seychelles. It is found in its natural state only on Aride Island, where its habitat is protected by Island Conservation Society.
