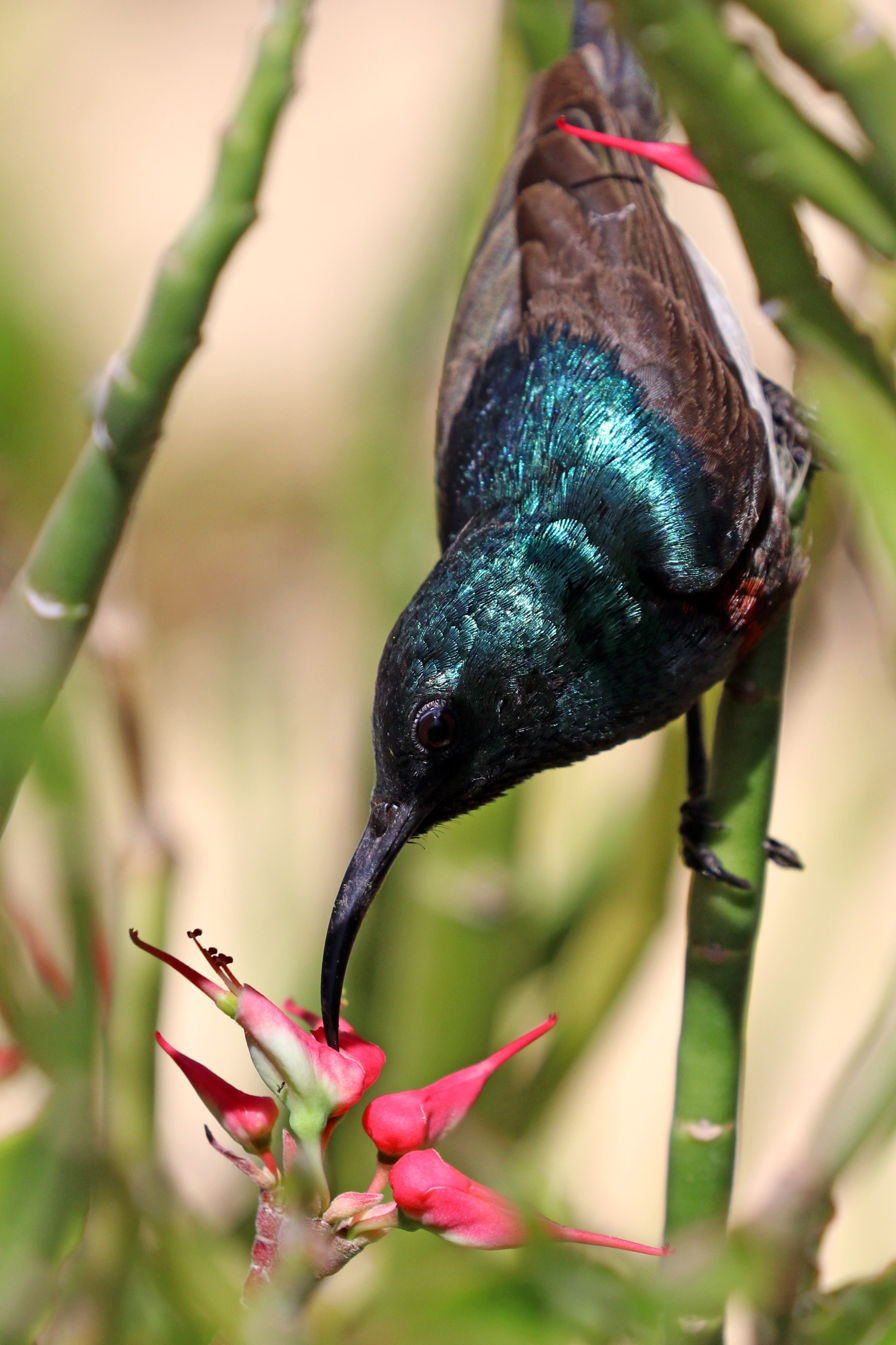
- male
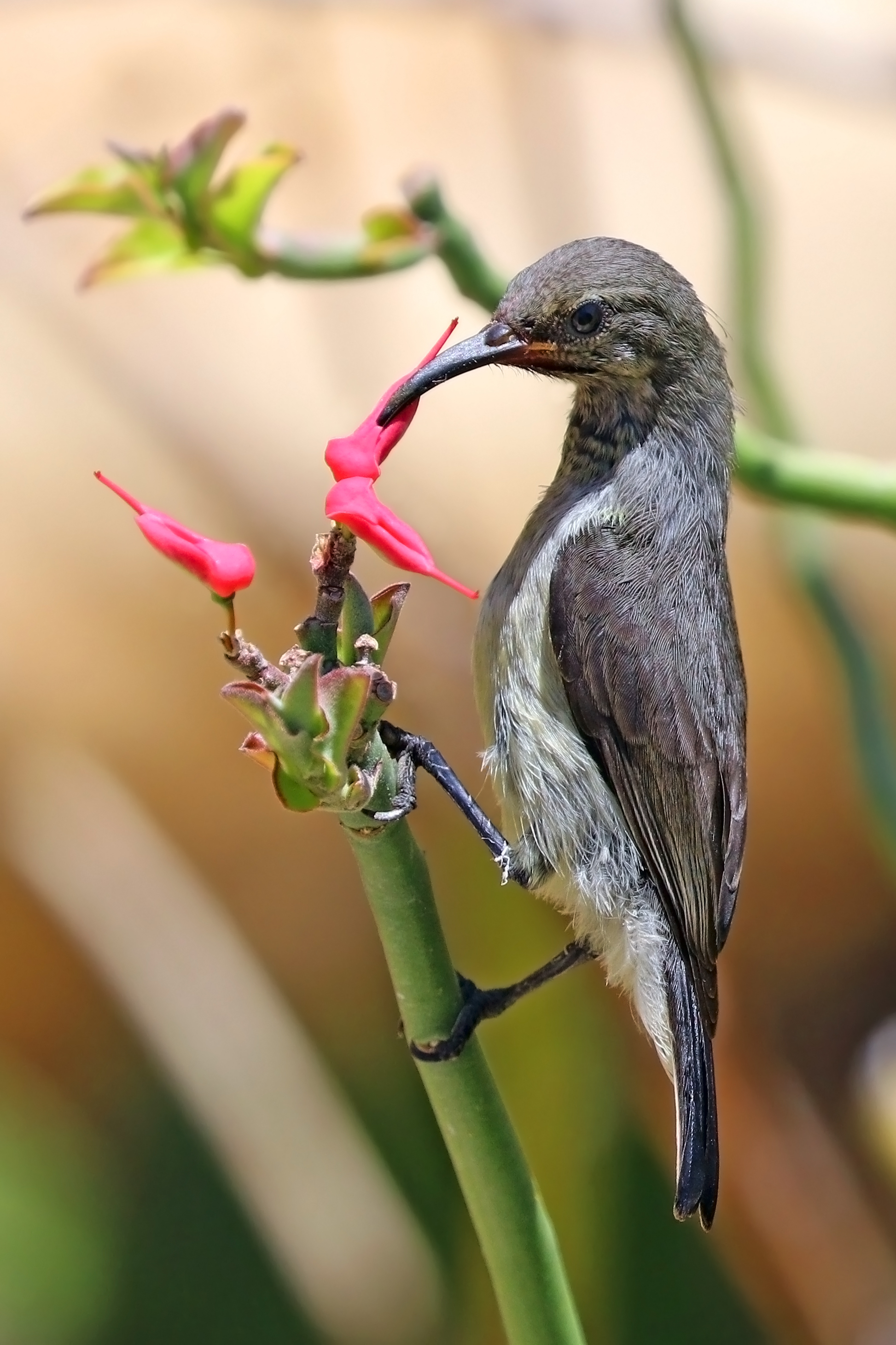
- female both C. s. apolis at Toliara

Conservation status
- Least Concern (IUCN 3.1)

Scientific classification
- Kingdom: Animalia
- Phylum: Chordata
- Class: Aves
- Order: Passeriformes
- Family: Nectariniidae
- Genus: Cinnyris
- Species: C. sovimanga

Binomial name
- Cinnyris sovimanga (Gmelin, JF, 1788)

Synonyms
- Nectarinia sovimanga

= Souimanga sunbird =

Species of bird

The souimanga sunbird (Cinnyris sovimanga) is a small passerine bird of the sunbird family, Nectariniidae. It is native to the islands of the western Indian Ocean where it occurs on Madagascar, the Aldabra Group and the Glorioso Islands.

== Taxonomy ==
The souimanga sunbird was formally described in 1788 by the German naturalist Johann Friedrich Gmelin in his revised and expanded edition of Carl Linnaeus's Systema Naturae. He placed it with the tree-creepers in the genus Certhia and coined the binomial name Certhia sovimanga. The specific epithet sovimanga comes from a French name for the bird, Souï-manga. Gmelin based his account on "Le grimpereau violet de Madagascar" that had been described and illustrated in 1760 by the French zoologist Mathurin Jacques Brisson and Le Soui-Manga that had been described in 1778 by the Comte de Buffon. The souimanga sunbird is now placed in the large genus Cinnyris that was introduced in 1816 by the French naturalist Georges Cuvier.

Five subspecies are recognised:

- C. s. sovimanga (Gmelin, JF, 1788) – Iles Glorieuses (northwest of Madagascar) and Madagascar (except south)
- C. s. apolis Hartert, EJO, 1920 – south Madagascar
- C. s. aldabrensis Ridgway, 1894 – Aldabra (west Aldabra group, southwest Seychelles)
- C. s. abbotti Ridgway, 1894 – Assumption Island (southwest Aldabra group, southwest Seychelles)
- C. s. buchenorum Williams, JG, 1953 – Cosmoledo and Astove Atoll (east Aldabra group, southwest Seychelles)

The subspecies C. s. abbotti was formerly sometimes treated as a separate species, Abbott's sunbird (Cinnyris abbotti).

== Description ==
The souimanga sunbird is 10 centimetres (3.9 in) long with a wingspan of 13 centimetres (5.1 in). The black bill is long, thin and curved. Males of the nominate subspecies have a metallic green head, back and throat. The breast is blackish with a more or less continuous red band while the belly is yellow and the wings and tail are brown. There are yellow tufts at the sides of the breast which become visible when the birds lift their wings in courtship display. Males presumably moult into a duller eclipse plumage by March–April, losing most of the metallic and red feathering for a few months. Females have grey-brown upperparts, a dull yellow belly and a grey throat and breast with darker markings. Juveniles are similar to the adult females but the chin and throat are sometimes black and the upperparts may be more olive.

Subspecies C. s. abbotti is larger - 11 centimetres (4.3 in) long with a 14 centimetres (5.5 in) wingspan. The males have a broader red breastband and there is no yellow on the underparts which are dark brown (ssp. abbotti) or blackish (ssp. buchenorum).

Male birds of the nominate group have wings of c.50–58 millimetres (2.0–2.3 in), tails of c.31–41 millimetres (1.2–1.6 in) and 20–25 millimetres (0.79–0.98 in) long bills. Females measure 10% less.

This bird has a chirruping flight call and a loud, hoarse alarm call. Only the male sings; a fast and scratchy song with frequently repeated phrases.

== Behaviour and ecology ==
Together with the Malagasy white-eye and the Madagascar cisticola, souimanga sunbirds are the most common small landbirds across much of their range; ample stocks of the present species and the white-eye exist in the maybe 4 square kilometres (1.5 sq mi) of habitat in the Glorioso Islands. The IUCN considers it a species of least concern.

The souimanga sunbird can be found in a variety of habitats from mountain forests to mangroves and scrubland as well as in parks, gardens and other human-modified ecosystems. They use their curved bill to probe flowers for nectar and also feed on insects and spiders. They have few natural enemies and their nests are inaccessible to most predators.

=== Breeding ===
The long breeding season lasts from August to March on Aldabra at least. The nest is dome-shaped and has an entrance hole on the side. It is made of plant material such as grass stems, coconut fibre and leaves. It is usually suspended from a branch about 1 to 2 metres (3 ft 3 in to 6 ft 7 in) above the ground but may be built on a building or in a sinkhole within eroded coral. Two eggs are laid and are incubated for 13 to 14 days; they are whitish with reddish mottling. The young birds fledge after 16 to 18 days. Nest-building and incubation of the eggs are done by the female who also plays a greater role than the male in feeding the chicks.

== Gallery ==
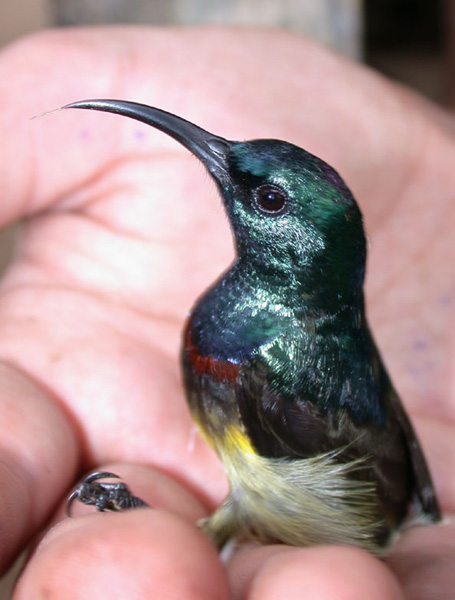
C. s. sovimanga

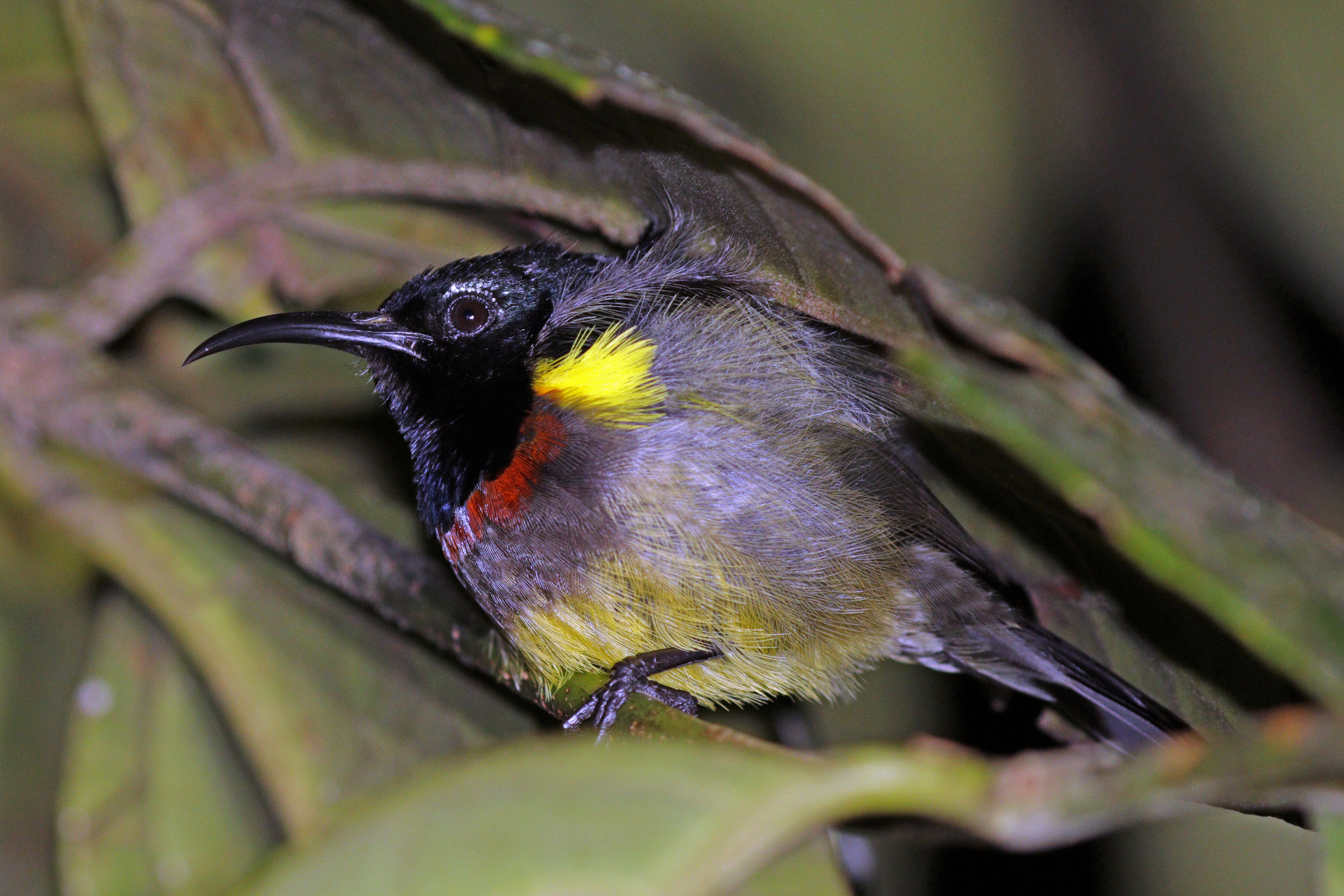
C. s. sovimanga roosting at night, Ranomafana National Park
