= Rothmannia macrosiphon =

Conservation status
- Vulnerable (IUCN 2.3)

Scientific classification
- Kingdom: Plantae
- Clade: Tracheophytes
- Clade: Angiosperms
- Clade: Eudicots
- Clade: Asterids
- Order: Gentianales
- Family: Rubiaceae
- Genus: Rothmannia
- Species: R. macrosiphon

Binomial name
- Rothmannia macrosiphon (Engl.) Bridson

Species of plant

Rothmannia macrosiphon is a species of plant in the family Rubiaceae. It is found in Kenya and Tanzania.
