= Rothmannia lujae =

Scientific classification
- Kingdom: Plantae
- Clade: Tracheophytes
- Clade: Angiosperms
- Clade: Eudicots
- Clade: Asterids
- Order: Gentianales
- Family: Rubiaceae
- Genus: Rothmannia
- Species: R. lujae

Binomial name
- Rothmannia lujae (De Wild.) Keay

Species of plant

Rothmannia lujae (Common name speckled randia) is a midlevel rainforest tree in the family Rubiaceae which is found in southern Nigeria, Equatorial Guinea, Gabon, western Cameroon, and into the Democratic Republic of Congo (Kinshasa). It is noted for having an 20 cm (7.9 in) diameter fruit which requires several years to mature. The flowers are large, trumpet-shaped and white with purple speckles. The tree is up to 30 metres (98 ft) in height, but only about 1.6 m (5 ft 3 in) girth.
