= Astove Atoll =

Island in the Outer Islands of Seychelles

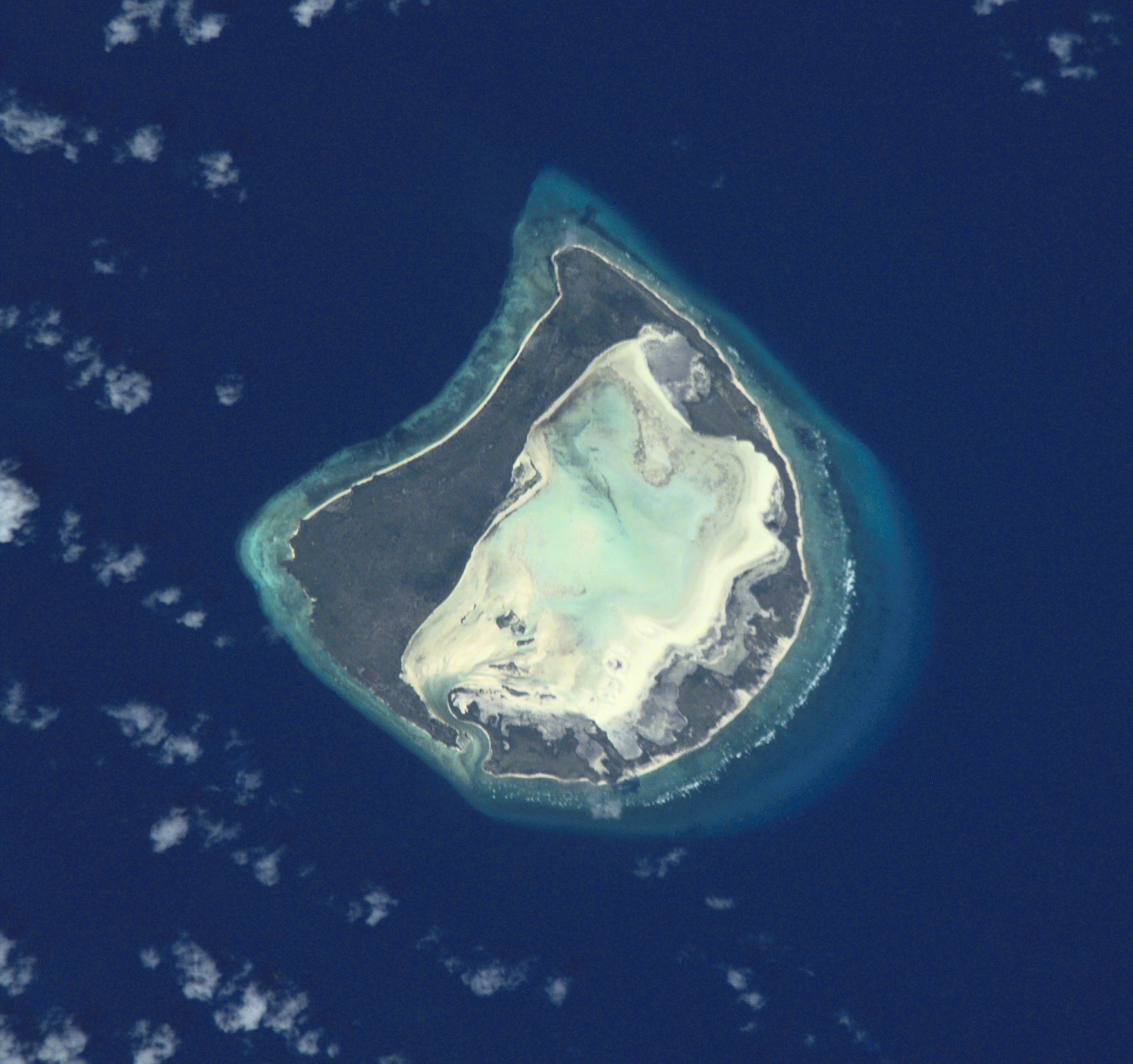
- Astove Atoll, slightly oblique view from space. Note the wide land area (dark) surrounding the whitish lagoon

- Location within Seychelles

Geography
- Location: Indian Ocean
- Coordinates: 10°06′S 47°45′E
- Type: Atoll
- Archipelago: Seychelles
- Adjacent to: Indian Ocean
- Total islands: 15
- Major islands: Astove; Charlotte
- Area: 7.9 km^{2} (3.1 sq mi)
- Highest elevation: 18 m (59 ft)

Administration
- Seychelles
- Group: Outer Islands
- Sub-Group: Aldabra Group
- Sub-Group: Astove Atoll
- Districts: Outer Islands District
- Largest city: Astove (pop. 2)

Demographics
- Population: 2 (2016)
- Pop. density: 0.25/km^{2} (0.65/sq mi)
- Ethnic groups: Creole, French, East Africans, Indians.

Additional information
- Time zone: SCT (UTC+4)
- ISO code: SC-26
- Official website: www.seychelles.travel/en/discover/the-islands/outer-islands

Astove Atoll is a large atoll, part of the Aldabra Group, lying in the Outer Islands of Seychelles, 1,041 km (647 mi) southwest of the capital, Victoria, on Mahé Island. Alphonse Fishing Company and Blue Safari Seychelles operate from the atoll, offering packages to sustainably fly-fish and dive the Astove Wall.

== History ==
The name Astove is said to be derived from the Portuguese As Doze Island, meaning the twelve islands, which may have been the original Portuguese name for Farquhar. Much of the region in which Astove lies was explored by Arab seamen and merchants between 1000 and 1500 AD, but there is no record of human settlement on the island before 1760. In that year, the Portuguese frigate La Dom Royal, laden with plunder and slaves, went aground at Astove. All aboard made it to the island, but the captain and crew soon abandoned Astove and struck out for Mozambique in a long boat. They never returned for the slaves, who organized into a community and subsisted on the bounty of the island and the sea.

A passing ship reported that there was “a treasure trove of slaves” to be had for the taking from Astove, but repeated efforts to capture them failed when almost all the ships foundered, as had the La Dom Royal. In 1796, a British ship attempted to remove the slaves by force – and succeeded in embarking some 100 of them – but the slaves revolted and helped thwart the effort, which failed completely when the ship foundered. There was, reportedly, great loss of life in the shark-infested waters.

In 1911, treasure hunters found near Astove the wreckage of La Dom Royal. They excavated the ship, finding gold and silver.

The remaining slaves on Astove were eventually picked up and evacuated to Mahe, leaving one sole survivor named “Paul” on the island. In 1799, a passing ship stopped at Astove and a search was made for this lone slave, but no trace of him could be found.

On the morning of August 12, 1836, the ship Tiger of Liverpool, which was commanded by Captain Edward Searight, was wrecked on the reef of Astove atoll. An account by William Stirling was published seven years later.

Human presence at Astove remained inconsistent throughout the 19th century and centered largely upon harvesting operations that were under way at the time. Astove was heavily mined for guano and phosphates, and hunted for its sea turtles, but for the most part remained not visited due to its remoteness and distance from normal shipping lanes.

In 1968, Astove atoll was occupied by British adventurer and businessman Mark Veevers-Carter and his American wife, Wendy (Day) Veevers-Carter, who was the daughter of American author Clarence Day (Life with Father). The couple had founded, operated and sold a successful copra plantation on the Seychelles island of Remire, and sought to do the same on the much larger island of Astove.

“When we landed on Astove, we found palm trees, a roofless wooden house and a graveyard,” wrote Wendy Veevers-Carter. “Part of the British-governed Seychelles, Astove was a ‘lost’ island.”

The Veevers-Carters built a 14-room house, a processing center, a chapel, a store and small residences for their Seychelleois employees. While copra constituted the primary cash crop, the Veevers-Carters plantation also grew tobacco and raised, for subsistence, goats, cattle and pigs. The life of the couple and their three children were chronicled by Wendy Veevers-Carter in an article for Parade magazine in June 1969.

“Mark has had painful trouble with his teeth but has borne the agony stoically,” she wrote in the article. “He must see a dentist soon, but that will mean a trip of many days.”

Her husband's dental problems necessitated a March 1970 journey to Kenya for medical treatment. He took with him the couple's broken short-wave radio and one of their three children, leaving his wife and their two sons on the plantation at Astove. On March 11, the 42-year-old Veevers-Carter died under anesthesia in the dentist's chair, but because there was no radio on Astove, word could not be quickly delivered to his wife.

Ten days after Veevers-Carter's death, the news was delivered to his family by the Kenyan cement carrier Bamburi, which took them to Kenya.

Wendy Veevers-Carter tried to manage Astove alone until November 1970, but found the task impossible. Returning to the United States with her children, she left Astove in the care of three Seychellois employees. Although she expressed hope in maintaining control over and access to Astove, she never returned and the island was abandoned.

In 2014 Astove was declared a nature reserve. A fishing resort and lodge have been built on the island.

== Geography ==
Astove atoll is located 35 kilometres (22 miles) SSE of Cosmoledo Atoll. It is a raised coral island of most peculiar form: a single stretch of land, that is 1.4 kilometres (0.9 miles) at the widest part, almost entirely encloses a shallow lagoon. The lagoon has a maximum depth of 3 metres (9.8 feet), and the only exit is a winding passage in the south, called Gueule Bras Channel. The lagoon includes some sandbanks and islands inside it.

Astove atoll measures 6 km (3.7 mi) north to south and 4 km (2.5 mi) east to west. The land area is 7.9 square kilometres (3.1 square miles), and the total area including the lagoon and reef is 21.2 square kilometres (8.2 square miles).

=== List of islets ===
	Island	type	Area (hectares)	Location
1	Astove	island	775.22	10°05′S 47°44′E
2	Gueule Bras	cay	0.18	10°06′23″S 47°44′04″E
3	Charlotte	cay	0.17	10°05′22″S 47°43′09″E
4	1	cay	0.60	10°05′40″S 47°44′04″E
5	2	cay	0.08	10°05′40″S 47°44′10″E
6	3	cay	2.70	10°05′40″S 47°44′15″E
7	4	cay	1.15	10°05′42″S 47°44′18″E
8	5	cay	0.93	10°05′47″S 47°44′21″E
9	6	cay	3.00	10°05′57″S 47°44′17″E
9	East Lagoon group	sand shoals	5.00	10°05′47″S 47°44′47″E
	Astove Atoll	Atoll	790	10°05′S 47°44′E

== Geology ==
Astove's unusual structure has raised questions about its formation. It was suggested that Astove is not a true raised atoll, but rather a reef flat, with the lagoon being washed out later. The lagoon becomes deeper in a slow pace, owing to rainwater, acidic from the soil's humic acids, dissolving the lagoon's carbonate rock bottom. This causes the unusual milky-white color of the lagoon's waters.

On the large land mass towards the western tip, exposed reef rock raises to some 5 metres (16 feet) ASL. Elsewhere it is largely covered by gravelly debris. Dunes of up to 18-metre (59-foot) line the windswept eastern rim of the island, and the eastern part of the lagoon is especially shallow due to the inblown dune sand. Astove Island's fringing reef is just about 180 metres (590 feet) (300 ft) wide. As noted above, beyond the reef's outer edge the seafloor drops down steeply, with a depth of 550 metres (1,800 feet) (300 fathoms) a mere 399 metres (1,309 feet) away from the shoreline.

== Climate ==
The climate is dominated by the southeast trade winds which are most pronounced between April and November. Temperatures are around 28 °C (82 °F) in the shade during that time, and slightly higher during the northwest monsoon season. At that time, tropical cyclones with torrential rain sometimes hit the island, but overall it is very arid.

== Demographics ==
The only settlement, on the western coast, was abandoned by the three Seychellois employees in 1972; it was resettled in 2014. The remnants of a former coconut and sisal plantation are present and attempts to maintain it are being made.

== Administration ==
The island belongs to Outer Islands District. Being an island with a small population, there are not any government buildings or services. For many services, people have to go to Victoria, which is a difficult task.

== Transport ==
The island is bisected by a 640 metres (2,100 ft) unpaved grass airfield (ICAO: FSSA) on the north east point of the island. The IDC put a staff of 2 people in 2014 to clear the airfield and restore the usage of it. The island is occasionally serviced by an Island Development Company (IDC) aircraft from Mahé.

== Economics ==
A small community is involved in small-scale farming and fishing for island consumption, as well as managing the newly opened lodge.

== Flora ==
Astove atoll has a very thin soil layer overlying its rocky core, which is pockmarked with caverns. Guano of nesting seabirds has accumulated in these, and the western part has been worked over and some of the guano was mined in the past. Large stretches of the reef rock were stripped bare of vegetation, but some Pisonia grandis and white milkwood (Sideroxylon inerme) persisted. The general vegetation on much of the island's western side is herbaceous plants however, mainly the leadwort Plumbago aphylla, as well as Stachytarpheta species and the crowfoot grass Dactyloctenium pilosum. Coconut palms (Cocos nucifera) remaining from the struggling plantation along the western shore, sisal (Agave sisalana), and wild cotton (Gossypium) are also found here and there. Maize (Zea mays) was planted by the guano miners, but presumably this plant which depends on constant care has disappeared since.

The eastern dunes are overgrown with the dropseed grass Sporobolus virginicus near the sea, and on the higher parts bwa matlo (bay cedar, Suriana maritima) shrubs are found. In more sheltered places, a regular scrubland of vouloutye (Scaevola taccada) and tree heliotrope (Heliotropium foertherianum), with some Pisonia, occurs. Here, the main herbs are fimbries (Fimbristylis) and the parasitic vine Cassytha filiformis.

The flats around the lagoon show a mixture of grassland (mainly pembagrass, Stenotaphrum dimidiatum) and Pemphis acidula scrub; in places, it is difficult to penetrate to the lagoon through the mass of Pemphis and bwa matlo. Small grey mangroves (Avicennia marina) line much of the southern half of the lagoon rim.

== Fauna ==
Astove atoll is home to four landbirds:

- Souimanga sunbird (Cinnyris sovimanga buchenorum) – an endemic race confined to Astove and Cosmoledo.
- Madagascar cisticola (Cisticola cherina)
- Pied crow (Corvus albus)
- Malagasy white-eye (Zosterops maderaspatanus)

There are few seabirds, probably due to the presence of rats and feral pigs. Unlike the other two atolls of the group, (Aldabra and Cosmoledo), there are no predator-free islets except for a few small sandbanks close to the lagoon entrance. At the lagoon, Caspian terns (Hydroprogne caspia) will often be seen but it is not known whether or not they ever breed on the sandbanks. Indopacific sooty terns (Onychoprion fuscatus nubilosus) and western black-naped terns (Sterna sumatrana mathewsi) have also been reported, but there are no confirmed breeding records. Green turtles (Chelonia mydas) remain very common here despite years of exploitation and remarkably high numbers will be seen on dives or from tender trips to the lagoon entrance close to high tide.

== Tourism ==
In 2014 a lodge to house fly-fishing enthusiasts was built. It opened in 2015. There is also a conservation centre operated by Island Conservation Society, whose staff research terrestrial and marine ecology. It is occasionally visited by cruise ships and charter vessels. A major attraction is diving cruises to the near-vertical drop-off from its outer reef edge. There are plans on expanding the eco-resort to 20 rooms.

== Image gallery ==
Map of Seychelles

District map of the Outer Islands

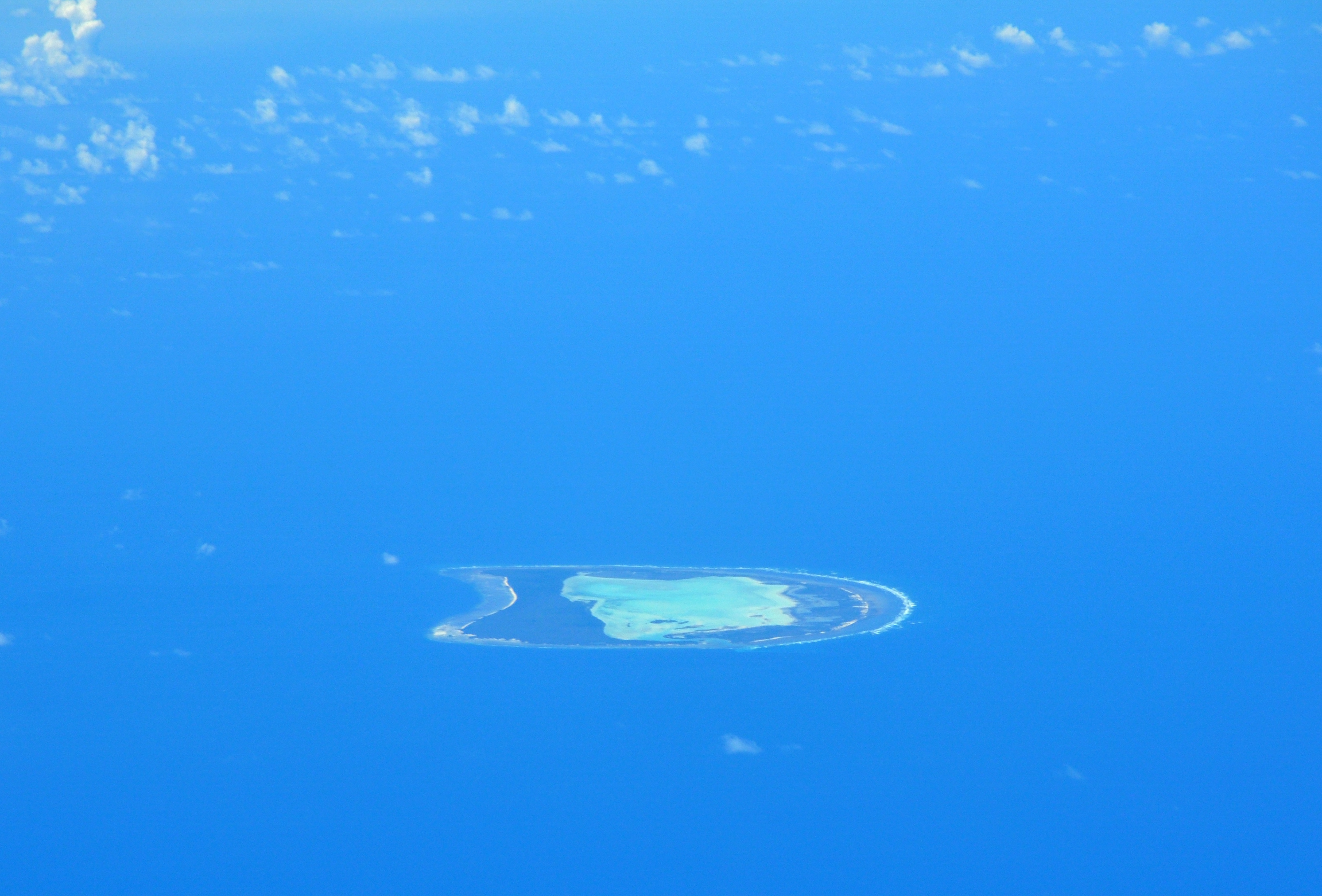
Aerial view
