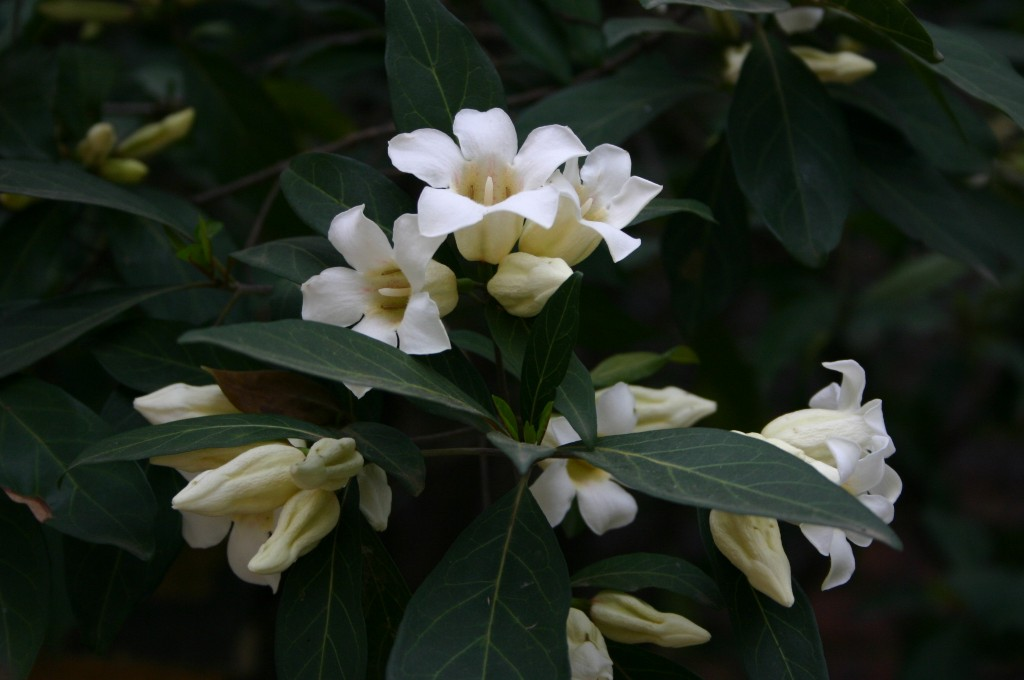

Conservation status
- Least Concern (IUCN 3.1)

Scientific classification
- Kingdom: Plantae
- Clade: Tracheophytes
- Clade: Angiosperms
- Clade: Eudicots
- Clade: Asterids
- Order: Gentianales
- Family: Rubiaceae
- Genus: Rothmannia
- Species: R. globosa

Binomial name
- Rothmannia globosa (Hochst.) Keay

Synonyms
- Gardenia globosa Hochst.

= Rothmannia globosa =

Species of plant

Rothmannia globosa is a small but highly decorative South African tree of the family Rubiaceae. It occurs in evergreen forest and along forest margins in the Eastern Cape and north to Limpopo Province and Eswatini.

Bark is greyish-brown with rectangular markings. Leaves are glossy, often with yellowish to maroon veins on the underside with acarodomatia in the axils – acarodomatia are common in this family and are a useful diagnostic character. The specific name refers to the spherical fruits of about 25mm diameter.
