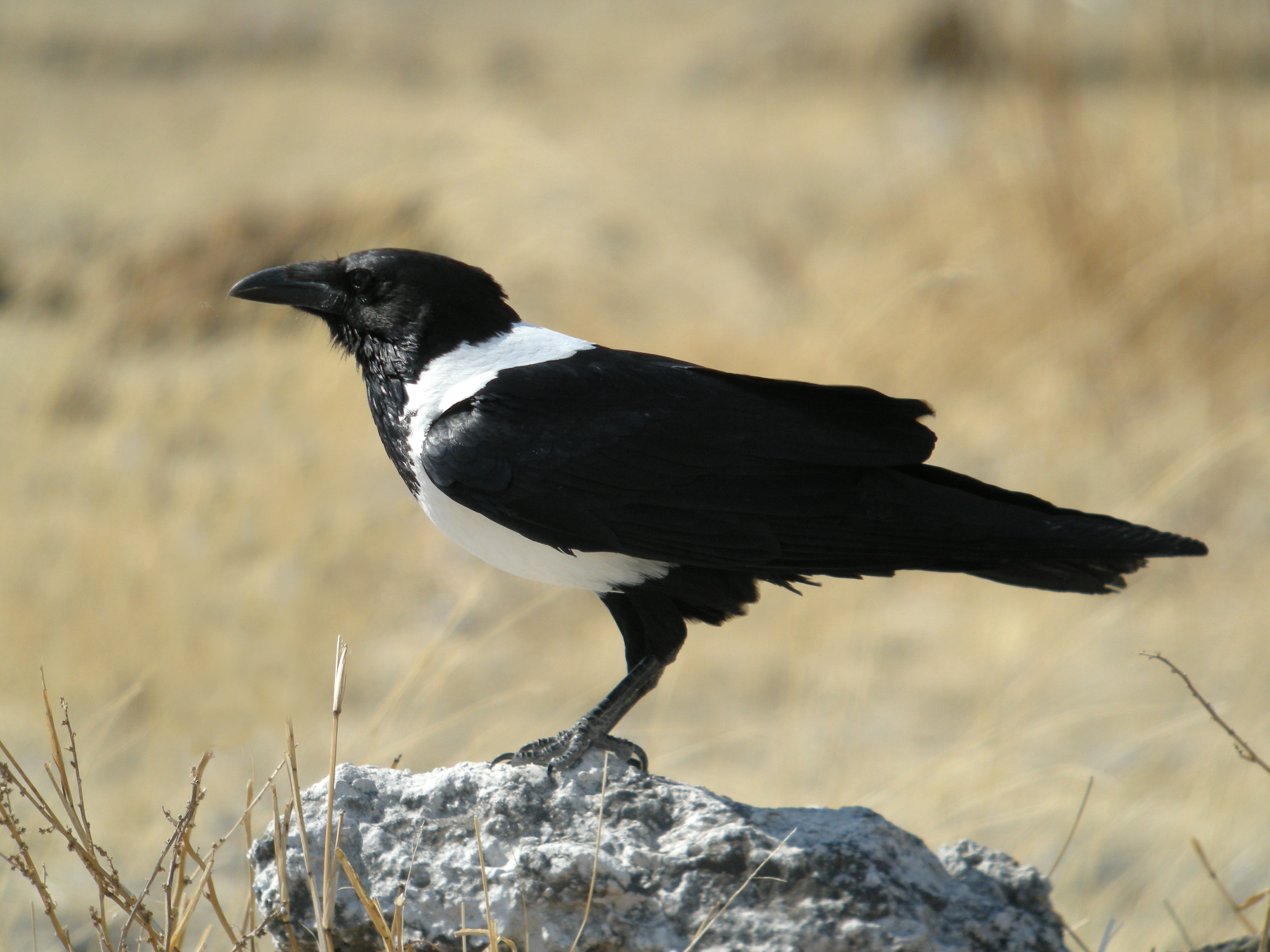
- In Etosha National Park, Namibia
- Sound

Conservation status
- Least Concern (IUCN 3.1)

Scientific classification
- Kingdom: Animalia
- Phylum: Chordata
- Class: Aves
- Order: Passeriformes
- Family: Corvidae
- Genus: Corvus
- Species: C. albus

Binomial name
- Corvus albus Müller, 1776
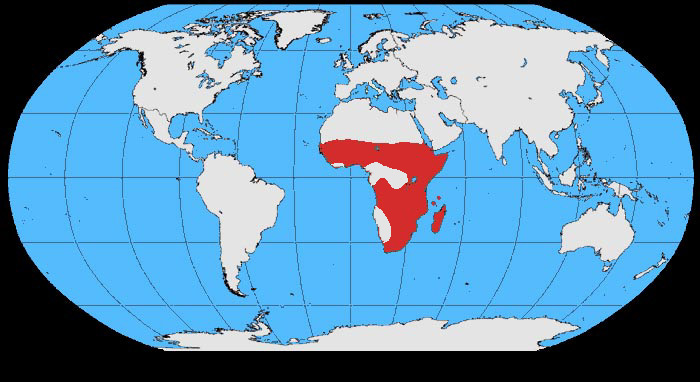

= Pied crow =

Species of bird

The pied crow (Corvus albus) is a widely distributed African bird species in the crow genus of the family Corvidae.

Structurally, the pied crow is better thought of as a small crow-sized raven, especially as it can hybridise with the Somali crow (dwarf raven) where their ranges meet in the Horn of Africa. Its behaviour, though, is more typical of the Eurasian carrion crows, and it may be a modern link (along with the Somali crow) between the Eurasian crows and the common raven.

== Description ==
It is about the size of the European carrion crow or a little larger (46–50 cm in length), but has a proportionately larger bill, slightly longer tail and wings, and longer legs. As its name suggests, its glossy black head and neck are interrupted by a large area of white feathering from the shoulders down to the lower breast. The tail, bill, and wings are black, too. Its eyes are dark brown. The white plumage of immature birds is often mixed with black. It resembles the white-necked and thick-billed ravens, but has a much smaller bill.

=== Measurements ===
- Length 46 – 52 cm
- Wing 328 to 388 mm (17 unsexed birds)
- Weight 520 g

=== Identification ===
In southern Africa, its range overlaps with the white-necked raven. The pied crow is slightly smaller and has a white chest and belly with a black, more delicate beak compared to the black chest and belly of the larger white-necked raven, which also has a white-tipped and weightier beak. It is larger than the black crow.

=== Voice ===
The voice is often described as a harsh ar-ar-ar-ar or karh-karh-karh.

== Taxonomy ==
The pied crow was first described in 1776 by Statius Muller. Its specific name is the Latin adjective albus, meaning "white".

The Maasai people call it ol-korrok from the sound of its call. It is considered annoying, but not a bird of ill omen.

== Distribution and habitat ==
This species, Africa's most widespread member of the genus Corvus, can be found in sub-Saharan Africa, specifically Nigeria, Ghana, Senegal, Sudan, Somalia, Eritrea, Zambia, Botswana, Mozambique and Zimbabwe, South Africa and on the large island of Madagascar, the Comoros Islands, Aldabra, Assumption Island, Cosmoledo, Astove Island, Zanzibar, Pemba, and Fernando Po. It does not occur in the equatorial rainforest region. It inhabits mainly open country with villages and towns nearby. This bird is rarely seen very far from human habitation, though it is not as tied to the urban way of life as the house crow (Corvus splendens) of Asia, and may be encountered far from human habitation in Eritrea.

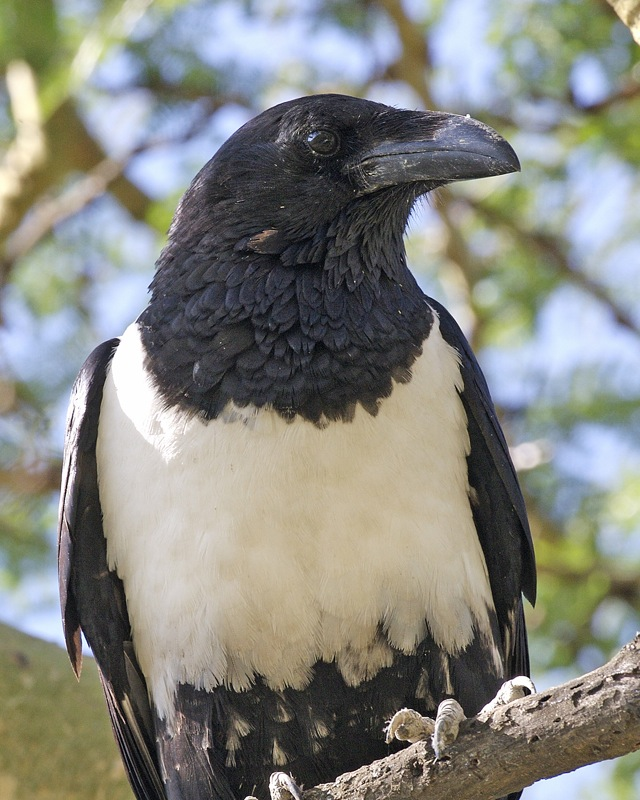

== Behaviour ==
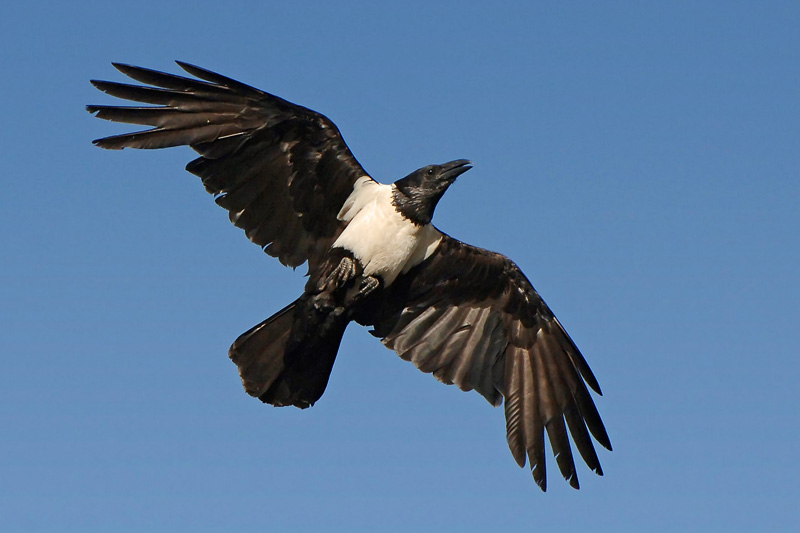
In flight

Pied crows are generally encountered in pairs or small groups, although an abundant source of food may bring together large numbers of birds. The species behaves in a similar manner to the hooded and carrion crows. In Dakar, birds have been observed mobbing passing ospreys and snake eagles, but avoiding black kites.

=== Diet ===
All of its food is obtained from the ground, trees, etc., including injured wildlife such as insects and other small invertebrates, small reptiles, small mammals, young birds and eggs, grain, peanuts, carrion, and any scraps of human food and fruit. It has been recorded killing and eating roosting fruit bats, and is frequently seen (sometimes in huge numbers) scavenging around slaughterhouses.

=== Digestion in the small intestine ===
The small intestines within the African pied crows include duodena, jejuna, and ilea, which are vital components for nutrient absorption, such as fats, proteins, and carbohydrates consumed by the crow.

Pancreatic ducts and two bile ducts make up the duodenum, so provide greater support for nutrient digestion. The wall of the small intestine is lined with four main tunics - tunica mucosa, tunica submucosa, tunica musclaris, and tunica serosa. The primary purpose of the said tunics is to protect the inner environment of the small intestine against foreign invaders that could otherwise harm the crow.

Pied crows tend to operate with restricted digestive capacity despite being capable of consuming greater than half their body weight of food per day. To maintain their slender weight, these birds rely on this reduced digestive capacity to aid in food regulation to ensure they can fly swiftly.

Pied crows obtain a characteristic looping and spiraling of their small intestines, which enhances their digestion and absorption of nutrients. These birds also obtain restricted gut retention time for food, but to combat this, they also have increased mucosal surface area evident within their digestive tracts.

=== Reproduction ===
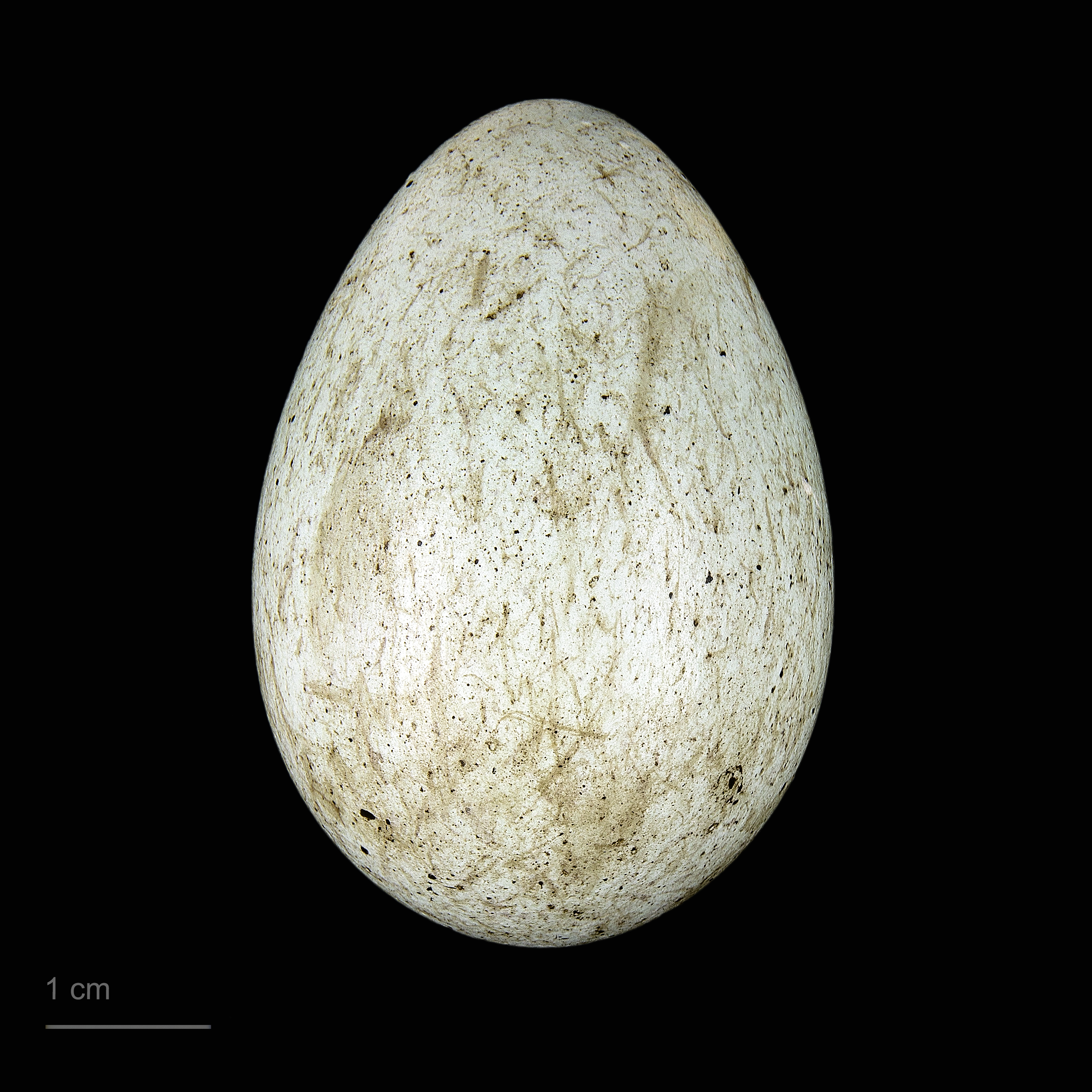
Corvus albus - (MHNT)

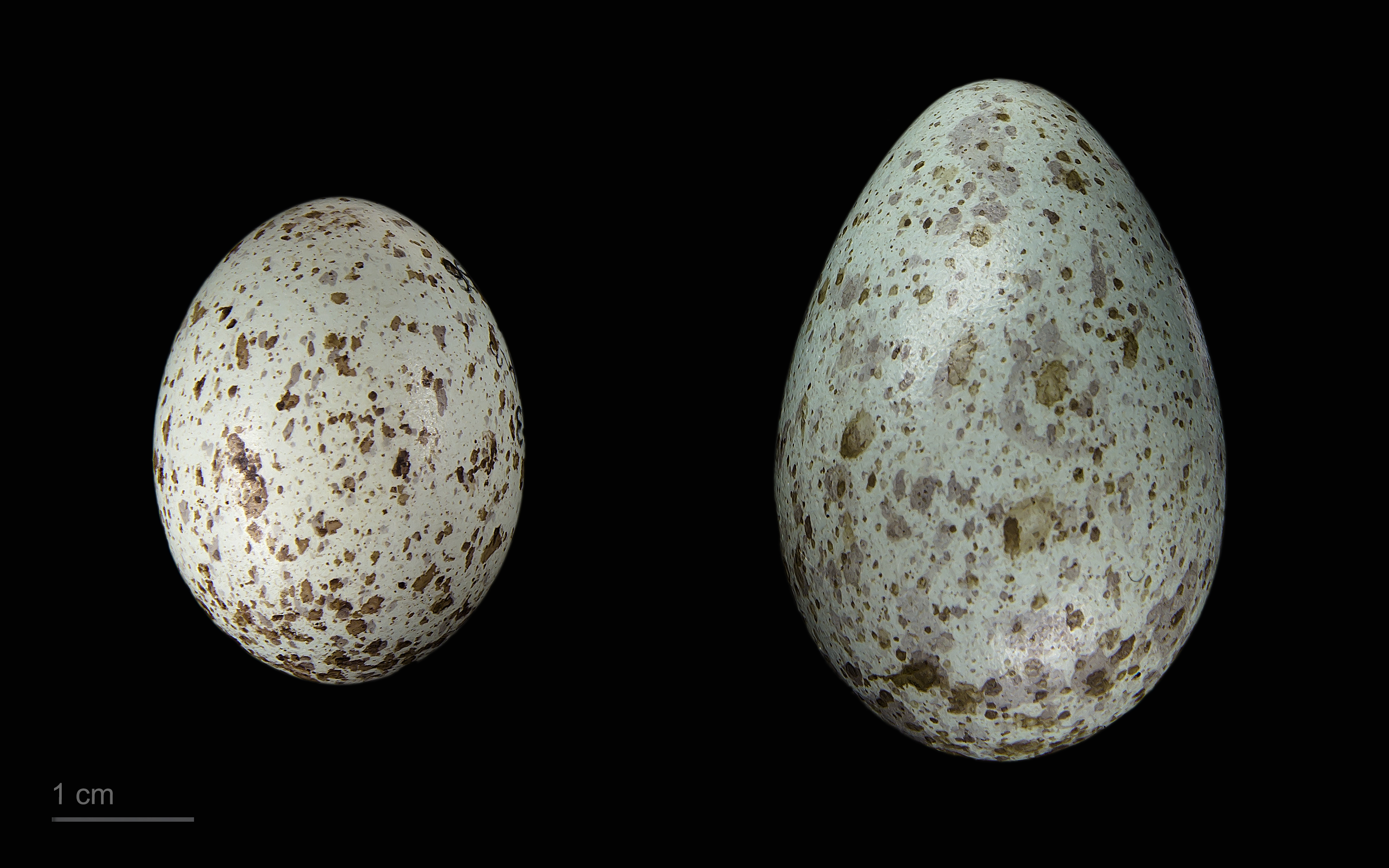
Clamator glandarius in a clutch of Corvus albus - MHNT

The nest is usually built in tall, isolated trees, though sometimes smaller specimens are used, depending on availability. The cross supports of telephone poles are also frequently used, and both sexes build the nest. A clutch of three to six eggs is laid from September to November (depending on latitude) and are pale green spotted with various shades of brown. The eggs are normally covered when the incubating female leaves the nest. Incubation is 18–19 days and the young are usually fledged by around 45 days. Both sexes rear the young.

== See also ==
- Cape crow also known as the black crow
