= Ridsdalea =

Scientific classification
- Kingdom: Plantae
- Clade: Tracheophytes
- Clade: Angiosperms
- Clade: Eudicots
- Clade: Asterids
- Order: Gentianales
- Family: Rubiaceae
- Subfamily: Ixoroideae
- Tribe: Gardenieae
- Genus: Ridsdalea; J.T.Pereira & K.M.Wong

Genus of plant

Ridsdalea is an Asian genus of plants in the family Rubiaceae; it was named after Dr. Colin Ernest Ridsdale (1944–2017), who was an English botanist and specialist in tropical plants and the Rubiaceae family. The type species is Ridsdalea grandis (Korth.) J.T.Pereira, which was renamed from the basionym Gardenia grandis. Several other species have been reassigned from other genera: notably Rothmannia, which is now reserved for African species. Its native range is southern China, Indo-China, Malesia and New Guinea.

== Species ==
As of January 2026, Plants of the World Online accepts the following 33 species:

- Ridsdalea alba K.Khamm.
- Ridsdalea anisophylloides (Wernham) J.T.Pereira
- Ridsdalea attopevensis (Pit.) J.T.Pereira
- Ridsdalea backanensis C.H.Nguyen & Aver.
- Ridsdalea daweishanensis (Y.M.Shui & W.H.Chen) J.T.Pereira
- Ridsdalea eucodon (K.Schum.) J.T.Pereira
- Ridsdalea forsteniana (Miq.) J.T.Pereira
- Ridsdalea graciliflora (Merr.) J.T.Pereira
- Ridsdalea grandis (Korth.) J.T.Pereira
- Ridsdalea kampucheana (Tirveng.) J.T.Pereira
- Ridsdalea kassamensis J.T.Pereira
- Ridsdalea lagunensis (Merr.) J.T.Pereira
- Ridsdalea leytensis (J.T.Pereira & Ridsdale) J.T.Pereira
- Ridsdalea macromera (Lauterb. & K.Schum.) J.T.Pereira
- Ridsdalea merrillii (Elmer) J.T.Pereira
- Ridsdalea negrosensis (Merr.) J.T.Pereira
- Ridsdalea nigrescens (Valeton) J.T.Pereira
- Ridsdalea papuana J.T.Pereira
- Ridsdalea philippinensis R.Bustam. & Pelser
- Ridsdalea pseudoternifolia (Valeton) J.T.Pereira
- Ridsdalea puffiana J.T.Pereira
- Ridsdalea pulcherrima (Kurz) J.T.Pereira
- Ridsdalea quadrasii (Elmer) J.G.Chavez, Meve & Liede
- Ridsdalea schoemannii (Teijsm. & Binn.) J.T.Pereira
- Ridsdalea sootepensis (Craib) J.T.Pereira
- Ridsdalea sundaensis J.T.Pereira
- Ridsdalea thailandica (Tirveng.) J.T.Pereira
- Ridsdalea uranthera (C.E.C.Fisch.) K.M.Wong
- Ridsdalea uvarioides (Valeton) J.T.Pereira
- Ridsdalea venalis (Bremek.) J.T.Pereira
- Ridsdalea vidalii (Bremek.) J.T.Pereira
- Ridsdalea vietnamensis (Tirveng.) J.T.Pereira
- Ridsdalea wittii (Craib) J.T.Pereira
