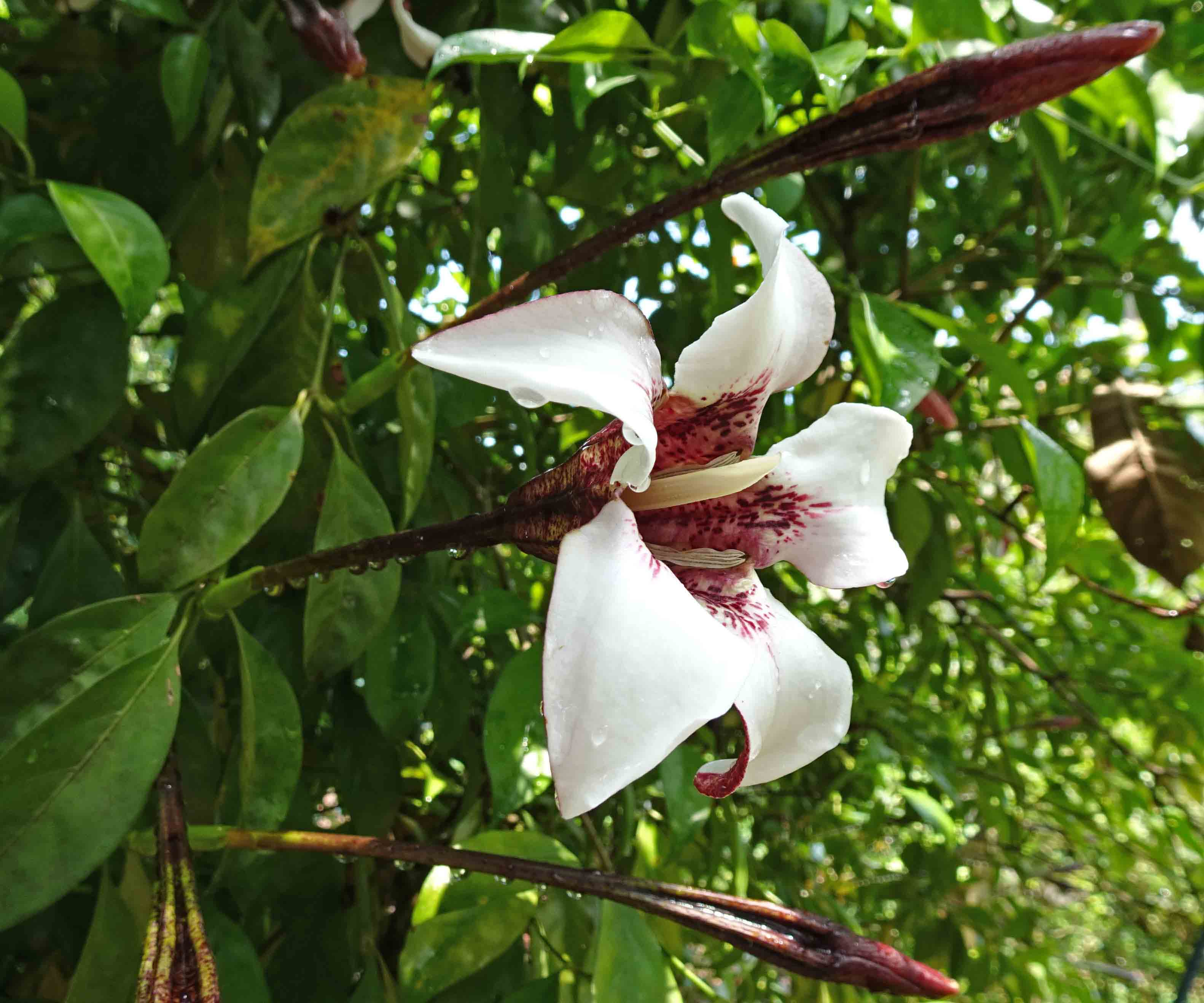
- Cultivated specimen in Singapore

Scientific classification
- Kingdom: Plantae
- Clade: Tracheophytes
- Clade: Angiosperms
- Clade: Eudicots
- Clade: Asterids
- Order: Gentianales
- Family: Rubiaceae
- Genus: Rothmannia
- Species: R. longiflora

Binomial name
- Rothmannia longiflora Salisb.

= Rothmannia longiflora =

Species of plant

Rothmannia longiflora a tree to about 9 m (30 ft) height and native to tropical Africa, in the family Rubiaceae. It is noted for its white and purple trumpet-shaped flowers, which may exceed 25 cm (9.8 in) in length.
