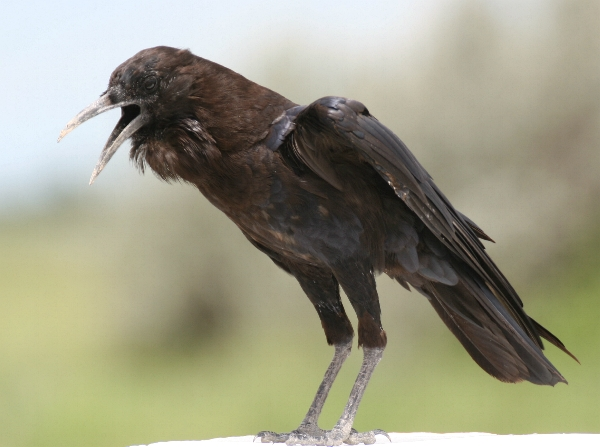

Conservation status
- Least Concern (IUCN 3.1)

Scientific classification
- Kingdom: Animalia
- Phylum: Chordata
- Class: Aves
- Order: Passeriformes
- Family: Corvidae
- Genus: Corvus
- Species: C. capensis

Binomial name
- Corvus capensis Lichtenstein, MHC, 1823
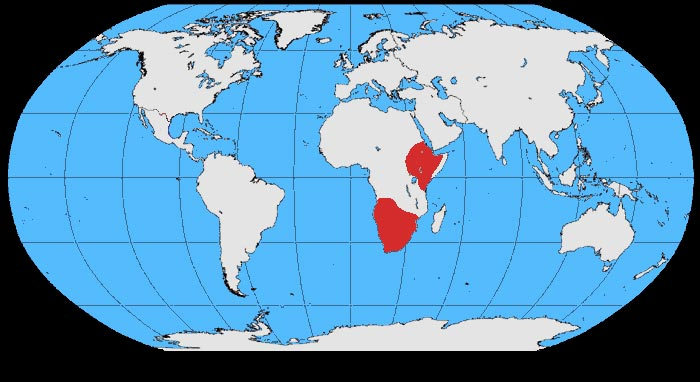

Audio
- Calls recorded in KwaZulu-Natal, South Africa

= Cape crow =

Species of bird

The Cape crow or black crow (Corvus capensis) is slightly larger (48–50 cm in length) than the carrion crow and is completely black with a slight gloss of purple in its feathers. It also has proportionately longer legs, wings, and tail, and has a much longer, slimmer bill that seems to be adapted for probing into the ground for invertebrates. The head feathers have a coppery-purple gloss and the throat feathers are quite long and fluffed out in some calls and displays.

== Distribution and habitat ==
This species occurs in two large separate regions of the African continent. One form ranges from the Cape at the southern tip of Africa north to southern Angola and across to the east coast of Mozambique. The other population occurs in a large area from South Sudan, Ethiopia, Tanzania, and Kenya in central East Africa. The more northern population is on average slightly smaller than the southern. It inhabits open grassland, moorland, and agricultural areas with some trees or woodland in the vicinity for nesting. It seems to thrive especially in agricultural areas.

== Behaviour ==
=== Diet ===
It eats grain and other seeds, and invertebrates, which it digs for with powerful downward stabs of its long bill. It opens maize kernels before they are fully ripe, bulbs and fleshy roots of certain plants, frogs and small reptiles, and fruits and berries. It takes the eggs and chicks of ground-nesting birds and has been known to kill birds up to a pound in weight (especially domestic poultry). It turns over the droppings of herbivorous mammals for insects.

=== Nesting ===
Nesting is almost always in trees, usually near the top, but has been known to nest in shrubs infrequently. Usually, three or four eggs are incubated about 18–19 days and hatchlings are fledged by around 38 days. Typically, only three nestlings survive.

=== Voice ===
The voice is described as a krrah.....krrah.....krrah or a quicker kah-kah-kah. It also makes very loud, liquid bubbling sounds that carry quite a distance; it also gives throaty chuckles. Some evidence indicates that vocal mimicry is practised, too.
