= Island Conservation Society =

Seychellois organization

The Island Conservation Society (ICS) was registered as an NGO in Seychelles on 25 March 2001. The Head Office, known as The Island Conservation Centre, is situated at Pointe Larue, Mahé. ICS focuses on the protection and rehabilitation of the small islands of Seychelles, particularly the outer islands.

Most of the outer islands of Seychelles are Government-owned and managed by the parastal company Islands Development Company (IDC). In 2007, ICS signed an agreement with IDC for conservation management on these islands. ICS now employs full-time scientists and rangers at conservation centres on six IDC islands, Silhouette Island, Alphonse Atoll, Desroches Island, Farquhar Atoll, Astove and Cosmoledo.

ICS has also managed Aride Island Nature Reserve since October 2003. Aride was previously owned and managed by the Royal Society of Wildlife Trusts (RSWT) of UK. In October 2003, the reserve was leased to ICS and a series of conservation targets were set by RSWT. In 2006, upon satisfactory completion of all targets, the island was transferred to a UK Registered Charity, Island Conservation Society UK with management delegated to ICS.

In 2005–2009, ICS implemented a major project funded by Fonds Français pour l’Environnement Mondial (French Global Environment Facility). The project focused on the restoration of five islands. Achievements include the eradication of rats on North Island, Seychelles, Conception Island and major islands of Cosmoledo Atoll, together with the transfer of several rare and threatened species to create new populations. ICS has also led the Seychelles White-eye Recovery Programme.

Island Conservation Society was admitted as a member of IUCN in November 2007. The Head Office is situated at Pointe Larue, Mahe, Seychelles.
