= Göran Rothman =

Swedish naturalist and physician

Göran Rothman (30 November 1739 – 3 December 1778) was a Swedish physician, naturalist and translator, remembered as an apostle of Carl Linnaeus. Trained at Uppsala during the final flowering of the Linnaean school, he combined medical practice with botanical collecting and a brief, ill-fated scientific expedition to North Africa. His later years were spent practising medicine and producing Swedish translations of Voltaire, Alexander Pope and Italian libretti, while the flowering-plant genus Rothmannia preserves his name in taxonomy.

== Early life and education ==
Rothman was born at Skatelöv in Småland to Johan Rothman, a physician–botanist who had studied at Harderwijk and Leiden. Rothman senior had previously been a tutor to young Carl Linnaeus at a grammar school in Växjö, and had cared for him like he would a son. He matriculated at Uppsala University in 1757, earned a master's degree in philosophy four years later, and on 27 May 1763 defended the medical dissertation De Raphania under Linnaeus. The thesis dealt with "Raphania" (ergotism), which Linnaeus believed arose from eating bread baked with newly harvested grain contaminated by Raphanus raphanistrum seed. After qualifying, Rothman settled in Stockholm as a physician; in 1765 he was sent to Åland to help curb a lingering plague outbreak, and in 1770 he was appointed supervisor of quarantine stations in the Stockholm Archipelago.

== Career and North-African journey ==
Through the Tripolitan envoy Abderhman, Rothman secured Royal Swedish Academy of Sciences backing for an exploratory voyage to collect plants in North Africa. He left Sweden in 1773 and spent three increasingly difficult years in Tripoli and neighbouring parts of present-day Libya and Tunisia. Promised funds failed to materialise, and the venture produced few specimens or publications; by the time he returned in 1776, Rothman was physically and financially exhausted. He resumed medical practice and lecturing in Stockholm but died two years later, aged just thirty-nine.

== Literary work and legacy ==
A keen man of letters, Rothman issued Swedish versions of Voltaire's work Zadig, Pope's Eloisa to Abelard and Ranieri de' Calzabigi's opera texts (including Orpheus and Eurydice and Alceste). Contemporary magazines also printed his poems, essays and correspondence from Africa. Although most of his field notes and herbarium material remained unpublished, his diary and plant collections survive in the Bergian Garden and the Royal Swedish Academy of Sciences (manuscript Resa till Tripoli år 1773–1776). In botany, his friend Carl Peter Thunberg commemorated him in the Rubiaceae genus Rothmannia, ensuring a permanent scientific memorial despite the frustrations of his African expedition.

The standard author abbreviation Rothman is used to indicate this person as the author when citing a botanical name.
