= Cosmoledo =

Atoll in the Outer Islands of the Seychelles

Cosmoledo Atoll
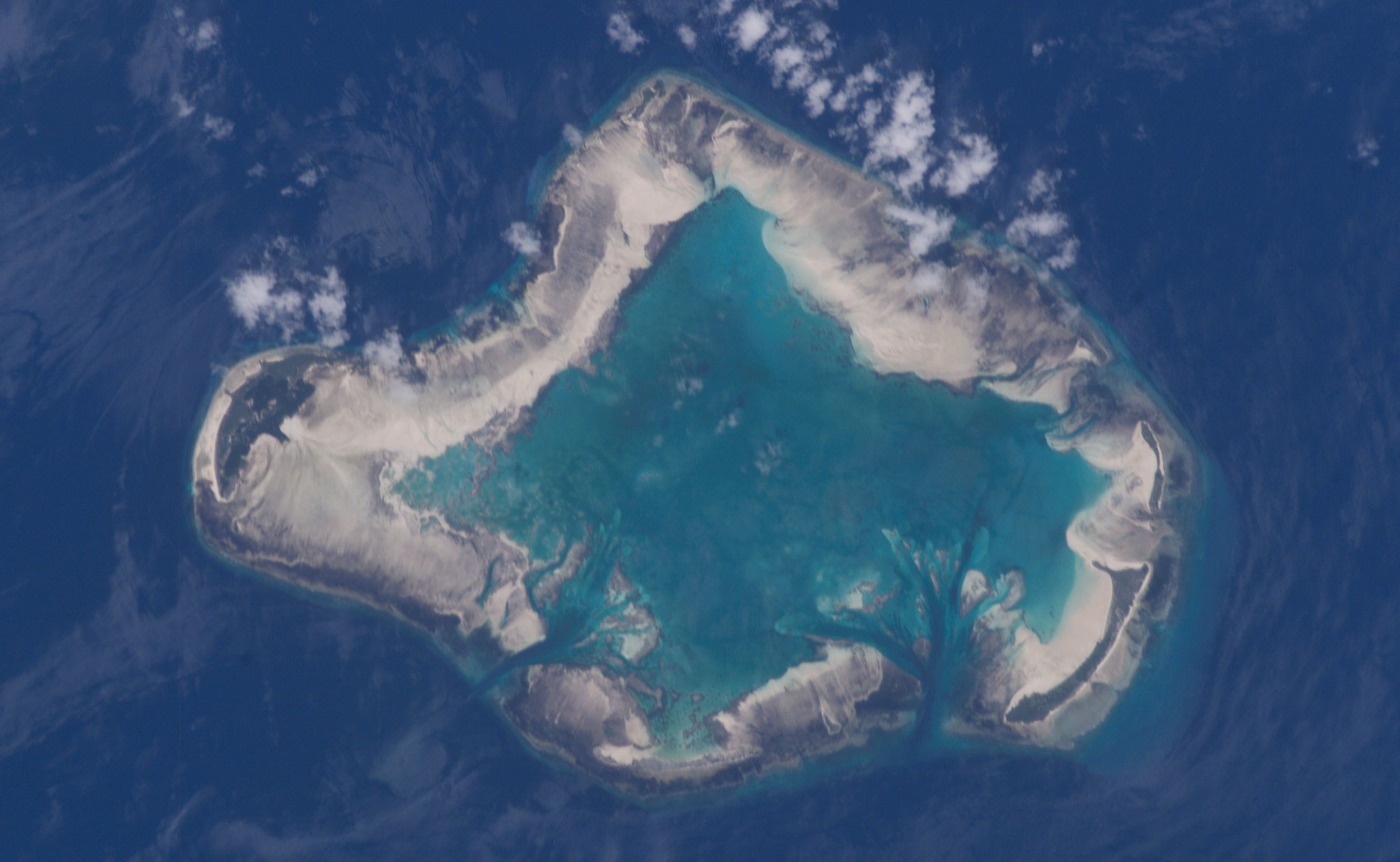
- Cosmoledo Atoll, astronaut photo from the ISS, 2003

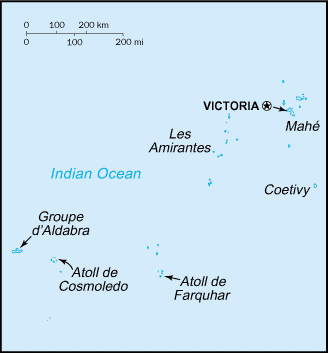
- Map of Seychelles showing the location of Cosmoledo Atoll

- Location of Cosmoledo Atoll in Seychelles

Geography
- Location: Indian Ocean
- Coordinates: 09°43′S 47°35′E
- Type: Atoll
- Archipelago: Seychelles
- Adjacent to: Indian Ocean
- Total islands: 23
- Major islands: Menai; Wizard; South; Grande Polyte; North-east
- Area: 5.13 km^{2} (1.98 sq mi)
- Highest elevation: 17 m (56 ft)

Administration
- Seychelles
- Group: Outer Islands
- Sub-Group: Aldabra Group
- Sub-Group: Cosmoledo Group
- Districts: Outer Islands District
- Largest settlement: Menai (pop. 0)

Demographics
- Population: 0 (2014)
- Pop. density: 0/km^{2} (0/sq mi)
- Ethnic groups: Creole, French, East Africans, Indians.

Additional information
- Time zone: SCT (UTC+4)
- ISO code: SC-26
- Official website: www.seychelles.travel/en/discover/the-islands/outer-islands/74-discover/the-islands/outer-islands/3007-cosmoledo-atoll

Cosmoledo Atoll is an atoll of the Aldabra Group and belongs to the Outer Islands of the Seychelles, and is located 1,029 km (639 mi) southwest of the capital, Victoria, on Mahé Island.

== History ==
The name Cosmoledo honours António (or Antão) Gonçalves Cosme Ledo who sailed to India in 1537 as pilot of the vessel Flor de la Mar, becoming patron chief before returning to Portugal in 1545 aboard the São Joao.

Menai and Wizard Islands were named after ships that explored the atoll on the Moresby Expedition in 1822.

In 1878, Sergeant Rivers visited the atoll and reported that judging by the turtle remains on the beach, the atoll was frequently visited by fishermen and whalers. He found a recently destroyed hut and ‘turtle park’ on Menai; a hut on the southern point of Wizard built from the wreckage of the Merry Monarch (wrecked in April 1874), which had been burnt. He reported that Menai was virtually covered with tall mangroves. Cosmoledo was settled shortly after this and a visitor in 1895 noted 200-300 coconut trees, maize and goats. By 1901, there were just two men on Menai, one on Wizard and four on North-east Island. Exploitation of guano on North-east Island was taking place in 1901, when 120 tons had been removed. A few years later, mangrove bark had become an important product; it was dried and exported for tannin. The atoll was inhabited as a fishing and turtling station until 1992 when it was abandoned.

== Geography ==
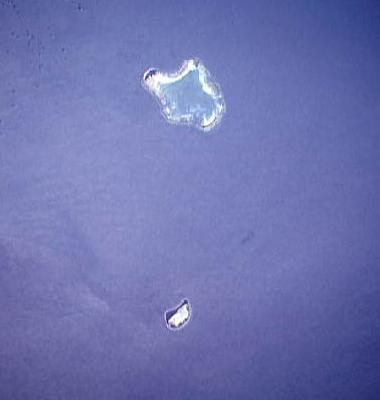
Cosmoledo Atoll and Astove Island

Cosmoledo Atoll is a raised coral atoll that is 17 km long east–west, and 12.5 km north–south. The islands land area is 5.2 km^{2}, and the lagoon and the reef flats have an area of 145 km^{2}. The closest island is Astove Island, 35 km farther south. The lagoon is up to 8.2 metres deep. Geologically, it is the twin of Astove Island, standing on the same volcanic basement measuring 85 km from north to south and 52 km from east to west and rising from a depth of over 4 km. The two islands are sometimes known together as the Cosmoledo Group. The two peaks join at a depth of around 1 km. Unlike the steep wall of Astove, the sea floor falls gradually to about 50 metres over a distance of up to a kilometer then more steeply reaching 500 metres in about 1.5 km. Two main passes lead from the ocean to the shallow lagoon, one northwest of South Island and one (Grande Passe) between Pagoda Island and Wizard Island. On the western coast, elevated reef rock forms undercut headlands mirroring the waves of the sea and separated by sandy beaches. There are sand dunes in the north and south, rising to about 10 meters.

=== List of islands ===
The Constitution of Seychelles names 20 islands although there are also a number of unnamed islets in the atoll.

	Island	Sobriquet	type	Location	Area (hectares)	Coastline (km)	Length (km)	Width (km)	elevation (m)
1			cay	09°40′00″S 47°33′54″E	0.22	0.20	0.07	0.03	0.00
2	West North	Île du Nord	island	09°39′39″S 47°34′20″E	12.10	2.26	0.83	0.17	8.00
3	Central North		cay	09°39′35″S 47°34′46″E	0.51	0.36	0.09	0.08	0.00
4	East North	Île Nord-Est	island	09°39′48″S 47°35′10″E	6.30	1.40	0.37	0.45	0.00
5			cay	09°40′06″S 47°35′50″E	0.47	0.38	0.09	0.09	0.00
6			cay	09°40′28″S 47°36′36″E	0.42	0.29	0.05	0.06	0.00
7	Trou	Île du Trou	cay	09°41′19″S 47°37′45″E	0.32	0.30	0.13	0.04	0.00
8	North Goëlettes		cay	09°41′58″S 47°38′40″E	2.50	0.95	0.37	0.15	0.00
9	South Goëlettes		cay	09°42′07″S 47°38′48″E	0.29	0.33	0.15	0.03	0.00
10	Grande Polyte		island	09°43′14″S 47°39′26″E	27.70	4.00	0.21	1.64	0.00
11	Petite Polyte		island	09°43′46″S 47°39′24″E	1.68	0.59	0.20	0.10	0.00
12	Wizard Island	Grande Île	island	09°45′00″S 47°39′00″E	160.40	9.60	3.6	0.56	17.00
13	Pagode		cay	09°45′48″S 47°36′24″E	5.00	1.24	0.42	0.19	6.10
14	South	Île du Sud-Ouest	island	09°46′13″S 47°34′58″E	42.30	6.5	0.25	2.92	6.00
15	Moustiques	Île aux Moustiques	island	09°43′57″S 47°30′35″E	1.90	0.66	0.24	0.11	0.00
16	Baleine	Île Baleine	island	09°43′28″S 47°30′40″E	1.05	0.45	0.10	0.14	0.00
17	Menai		island	09°43′S 47°31′E	246.80	10.05	1.10	3.18	12.20
18	Bat	Île aux Chauve-Souris	island	09°42′55″S 47°31′15″E	0.12	0.14	0.03	0.03	0.00
19	Macaques	Île aux Macaques	island	09°42′17″S 47°31′51″E	0.55	0.33	0.06	0.10	0.00
20	West Rat	Île aux Rats	island	09°42′20″S 47°31′38″E	0.08	0.12	0.03	0.05	0.00
21	East Rat	Île aux Rats	island	09°42′19″S 47°31′41″E	0.11	0.15	0.04	0.02	0.00
22	La Croix	Ilot la Croix	island	09°42′17″S 47°31′42″E	0.22	0.22	0.05	0.06	0.00
23	Observation		island	09°42′14″S 47°32′09″E	0.46	0.33	0.05	0.10	0.00
24	Middle	Îlet Milieu	island	09°42′10″S 47°32′14″E	0.56	0.50	0.20	0.05	0.00
25	Little Astove		cay	09°41′47″S 47°33′00″E	0.22	0.19	0.06	0.04	0.00
26			cay	09°40′16″S 47°33′42″E	0.03	0.08	0.03	0.01	0.00
	Cosmoledo Atoll		Atoll	09°43′S 47°35′E	513.00				10

The South-East passage is between Pagoda Island and Wizard Island. Menai Island west coast is sandy. Johannes Point, the NW extremity of the island, is conspicuous. The village is located at this point.

== Demographics ==
Menai has a large cemetery. the village was abandoned in 1992.

== Administration ==
The island belongs to Outer Islands District.

== Flora and fauna ==
Cosmoledo is an Important Bird Area and holds Seychelles' largest colonies of all three species of booby that breed in Seychelles. The atoll holds one of only two Seychelles populations of brown booby, breeding mainly on South Island, with a few on West-North Island. It also has the Indian Ocean's largest population of red-footed booby censused by the Island Conservation Society as about 15,000 pairs. Exploitation has wiped out the lesser frigatebird and has almost done the same to the great frigatebird, which is down to just 15 pairs compared to hundreds of pairs in the 1970s. Despite this, hundreds of non-breeding frigatebirds of both species are to be seen, these being probably from Aldabra. The lesser frigatebird also once bred but now may be extinct. Cosmoledo also has Seychelles' largest colony of sooty tern breeding on the northern end of Wizard Island. Second only to Aldabra are the numbers of breeding red-tailed tropicbird, black-naped tern and crested tern. In May 2023, Island Conservation Society discovered Caspian tern breeding on Menai, the second known oceanic breeding site in the world after Aldabra.

The lagoon is an important feeding ground for migratory waders, with crab plover and ruddy turnstone most common. There are three endemic races of land bird: the Madagascar white-eye (race menaiensis), the souimanga sunbird (race buchenorum) and a particular form of Madagascar turtle dove. The Madagascar cisticola is also common and there are a few pied crow present.

The flora is similar to that of Aldabra, with fewer species but including several plants endemic to the group. As on Aldabra there are areas of tall mangrove, especially on the lagoon side of Menai Island. Coconuts are common only on Menai, where many were planted.

There are some species of lizards, including Bouton's snake-eyed skink and the Madagascar banded lizard, the latter found nowhere else in Seychelles. Green turtles nest in large numbers, despite decades of exploitation in the past and poaching in the present. The reefs offer diving in Seychelles.

The Island Conservation Society employs staff during the fishing season, conducting conservation and rehabilitation work on the atoll. Rats have been eradicated from all islands except Menai.

== Tourism ==
There are fly-fishing cruises to the atoll on a regular basis. The IDC have proposed a plan for an eco-resort with about 20 rooms to be built at Menai in 2019.

== Image gallery ==
Map of the Seychelles

District map of the Outer Islands

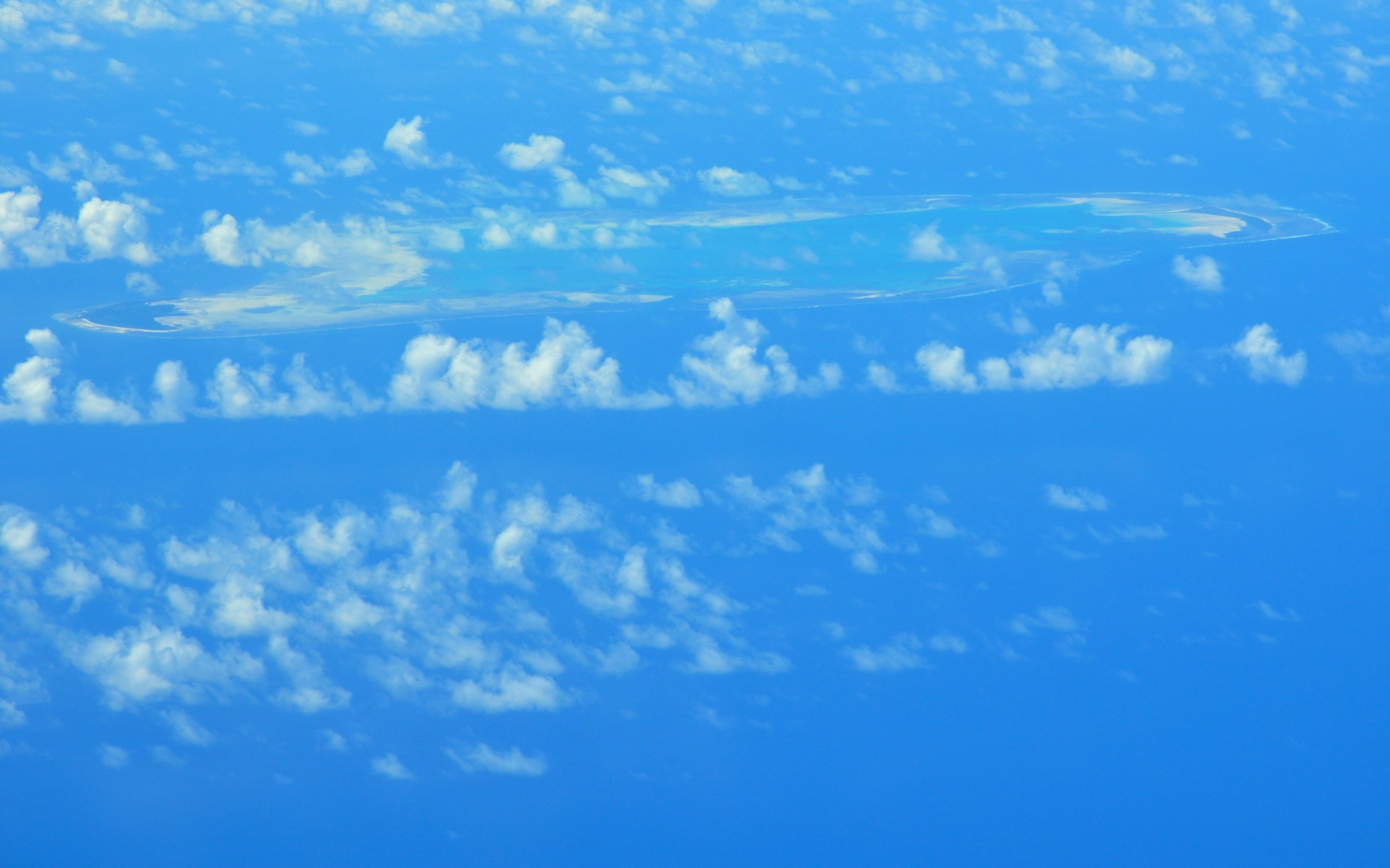
Cosmoledo from airplane
