= Ridsdalea grandis =

Scientific classification
- Kingdom: Plantae
- Clade: Tracheophytes
- Clade: Angiosperms
- Clade: Eudicots
- Clade: Asterids
- Order: Gentianales
- Family: Rubiaceae
- Genus: Ridsdalea
- Species: R. grandis

Binomial name
- Ridsdalea grandis (Korth.) J.T.Pereira, 2016

Synonyms
- Gardenia grandis Korth.; Randia grandis (Korth.) Valeton; Randia kuchingensis W.W.Sm.; Rothmannia kuchingensis (W.W.Sm.) K.M.Wong; Rothmannia malayana K.M.Wong

Species of plant

Ridsdalea grandis (synonym Gardenia grandis) is a species of flowering plant in the family Rubiaceae native to the Malay Peninsula, Sumatra, and Borneo; it is the type species of the genus Ridsdalea.
