= Ridsdalea eucodon =

Scientific classification
- Kingdom: Plantae
- Clade: Tracheophytes
- Clade: Angiosperms
- Clade: Eudicots
- Clade: Asterids
- Order: Gentianales
- Family: Rubiaceae
- Genus: Ridsdalea
- Species: R. eucodon

Binomial name
- Ridsdalea eucodon (K.Schum.) J.T.Pereira

Synonyms
- Randia eucodon K.Schum.; Rothmannia eucodon (K.Schum.) Bremek.

Species of plant

Ridsdalea eucodon (synonym Rothmannia eucodon) is a species of plant in the family Rubiaceae found in Indo-China. Its name in Vietnamese is găng cơm or găng cao.
