= Astove Island Airport =

Airport in Seychelles

- IATA: none; ICAO: FSSA

Summary
- Airport type: Public
- Serves: Astove Island
- Elevation AMSL: 10 ft / 3 m
- Coordinates: 10°03′40″S 47°45′00″E

Map
- Location of the airport in Seychelles

Runways
Direction	Length		Surface
Direction	m	ft	Surface
14/32	650	2,133	Coral
- Sources: GCM Google Maps

Astove Island Airport (ICAO: FSSA) is an airstrip serving Astove Island in Seychelles. The island is 1,040 kilometres (650 mi) southwest of the Seychelles capital of Victoria on Mahé Island.

== See also ==
- List of airports in Seychelles
- Transport in Seychelles
