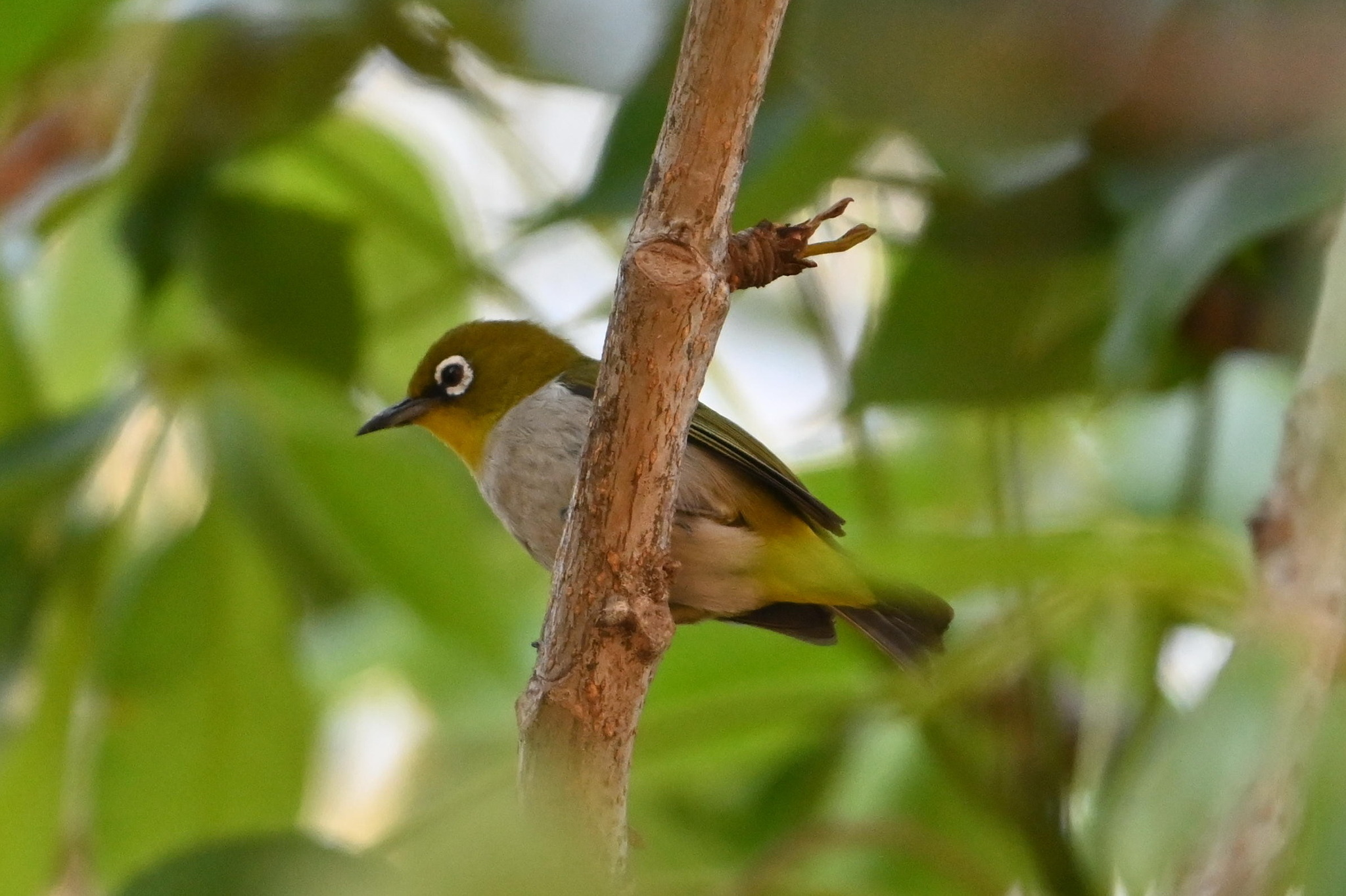

Conservation status
- Least Concern (IUCN 3.1)

Scientific classification
- Kingdom: Animalia
- Phylum: Chordata
- Class: Aves
- Order: Passeriformes
- Family: Zosteropidae
- Genus: Zosterops
- Species: Z. maderaspatanus

Binomial name
- Zosterops maderaspatanus (Linnaeus, 1766)

= Malagasy white-eye =

Species of bird

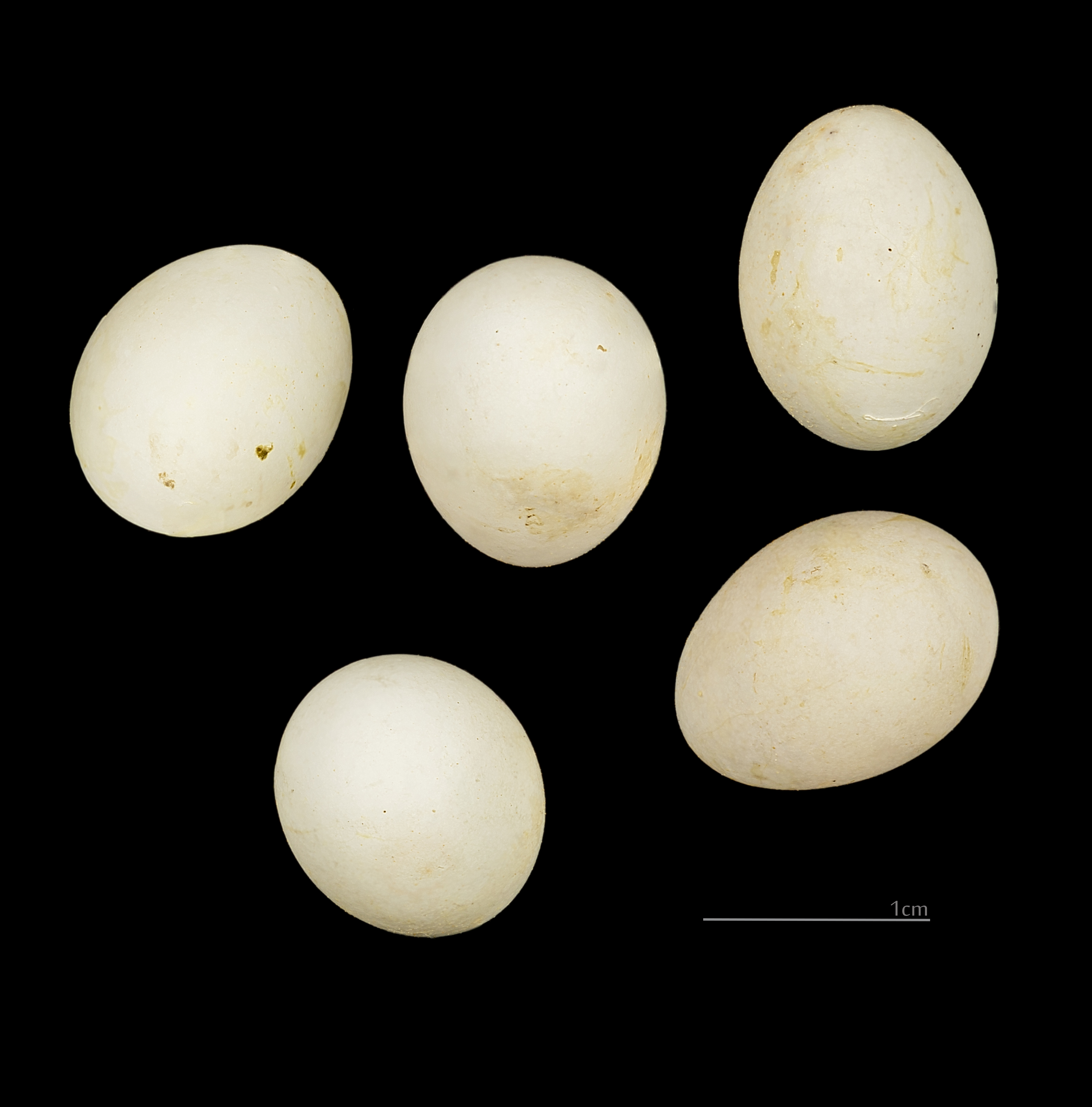
Z. maderaspatanus eggs

The Malagasy white-eye (Zosterops maderaspatanus) is a species of bird in the white-eye family, Zosteropidae. Found in Madagascar and Seychelles, its natural habitats are subtropical or tropical dry forests, subtropical or tropical moist lowland forests, subtropical or tropical mangrove forests, and subtropical or tropical moist montane forests.

== Taxonomy ==
In 1760 the French zoologist Mathurin Jacques Brisson included a description of the Malagasy white-eye in his Ornithologie based on a specimen collected in Madagascar. He used the French name Le petit figuier de Madagascar and the Latin Ficedula Madagascariensis minor. Although Brisson coined Latin names, these do not conform to the binomial system and are not recognised by the International Commission on Zoological Nomenclature. When in 1766 the Swedish naturalist Carl Linnaeus updated his Systema Naturae for the twelfth edition, he added 240 species that had been previously described by Brisson. One of these was the Malagasy white-eye. Linnaeus included a brief description, coined the binomial name Motacilla maderaspatana and cited Brisson's work. Although Linnaeus gave the type locality as Madagascar he confusingly used the specific name maderaspatana which is Neo-Latin for Madras (now Chennai) in India. This species is now placed in the genus Zosterops that was introduced by the naturalists Nicholas Vigors and Thomas Horsfield in 1827.

Four subspecies are recognised:

- Z. m. aldabrensis Ridgway, 1894 – island of Aldabra (southwest Seychelles)
- Z. m. maderaspatanus (Linnaeus, 1766) – Madagascar and Glorioso Islands (off northwest Madagascar)
- Z. m. voeltzkowi Reichenow, 1905 – Europa Island (southwest Madagascar)
- Z. m. menaiensis Benson, 1969 – Cosmoledo Atoll and Astove Island (southwest Seychelles)

== Description ==
This white-eye grows to a length of about 10 cm (4 in). The upperparts, wings and tail are a dark olive green, the throat is yellow and the breast and belly pale grey. The white eye ring is incomplete, there being a gap at the front of the reddish-brown eye. The upper mandible of the beak is black and the lower mandible is grey. The legs and feet are greyish-blue.

== Distribution and habitat ==
The Malagasy white-eye occurs in Madagascar and the Seychelles. Small groups of these birds can be found in woodland, foraging among the branches and flitting between the trees, calling constantly to each other with a soft "pee-u".

== Behaviour and ecology ==
A lively and agile bird, its flight is strong but jerky, each flight covering only a short distance. It feeds in the open during the day and moves deeper into the forest at night. It likes to bathe in pools and also makes use of water trapped in hollows in trees for this purpose. Mutual preening sometimes takes place, with two birds almost leaning on one another as they preen around the head, face and chin.

The diet consists mainly of invertebrates and fruits, also including nectar, pollen, flower buds and other vegetable matter. Insects are found by gleaning on twigs and branches, the bird sometimes clinging upside-down to the trunk of a tree. Prey is sometimes caught in the air by hawking, and the bird may hover briefly while taking food, and probe into inflorescences and lichens, sometimes becoming dusted with pollen.

Breeding takes place in the austral summer. The nest is a cup-shaped structure hung from the fork of a branch or built in the middle of a bush. It is made from grass stems and flower heads, fine rootlets, slender fibres, hairs and moss. Two to three eggs are laid.

== Status ==
The Malagasy white-eye has a very wide range and is described as common. No particular threats have been recognised and the International Union for Conservation of Nature has evaluated its conservation status as being of "least concern".
