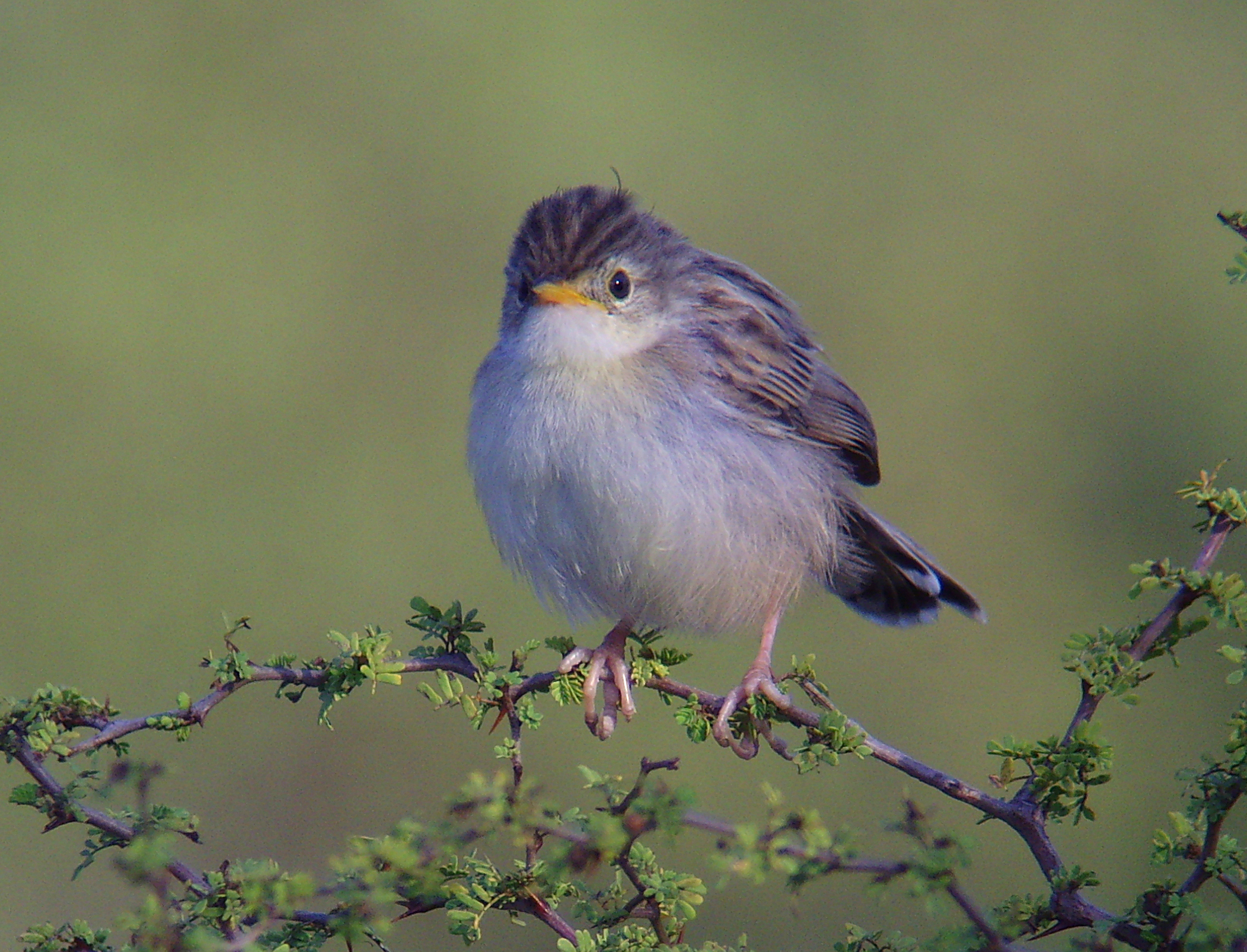

Conservation status
- Least Concern (IUCN 3.1)

Scientific classification
- Kingdom: Animalia
- Phylum: Chordata
- Class: Aves
- Order: Passeriformes
- Family: Cisticolidae
- Genus: Cisticola
- Species: C. cherina

Binomial name
- Cisticola cherina (Smith, 1843)

= Madagascar cisticola =

Species of bird

The Madagascar cisticola (Cisticola cherina) is a species of bird in the cisticola family (Cisticolidae). It inhabits areas to the west of the ˞Indian Ocean. It forms a superspecies with the closely related zitting cisticola and the Socotra cisticola.

== Description ==
Madagascar cisticolas are small cisticolas, 11 cm long and weighing 8-11 g. Overall they have brownish streaked backs, wings and heads and pale undersides. There are different colour variants, one more brownish, the other paler grey. Its call is described as a loud explosive ticking.

== Distribution and habitat ==
It is found across the whole of Madagascar and the islands of Astove and Cosmoledo in the Seychelles. The Seychelles birds are suspected to be recent arrivals, although there are some early records of the species there. It occupies a range of open habitats, including savannah, grasslands, marshes, pastures, scrublands and forest edges and clearings. It is also found in a variety of human modified habitats, including paddy fields and croplands. The species is sedentary.

== Diet ==
Madagascar cisticolas are insectivores. They eat crickets and other insects. They tend to forage near cacti.
