= List of indigenous geckos of Madagascar =

There are more than ten genera of geckos indigenous to Madagascar, including: Geckolepis — fish scaled geckos, Paroedura — Madagascar ground geckos, Phelsuma — day geckos, Ebenavia, Matoatoa, Microscalabotes, Blaesodactylus and Uroplatus — leaf tailed geckos.

== Geckolepis ==
- Geckolepis humbloti
- Geckolepis maculata

Geckolepis maculata often shelter on Pandanus plants of the Paleotropics

- Geckolepis polylepis
- Geckolepis typica
- Geckolepis megalepis

== Paroedura ==
The genus Paroedura consists of several species of ground-dwelling geckos that live in most, if not all, of the habitats in Madagascar, ranging from dry deciduous foreststo spiny bush and deserts, to rainforests.

- Paroedura androyensis

A terrestrial and diurnal gecko that grows to approximately 15 cm in length. It lives in a dry forest habitat and typically shelters under wooden debris or trees.

- Paroedura bastardi

Paroedura bastardi is terrestrial gecko approximately 15 cm in length that lives in dry forests, and thornbush steppes. It requires a humidity between 60% and 80%, a daytime temperature between 25 and 28 degrees Celsius, and a nighttime temperature between 20 and 22 degrees Celsius to survive.

- Paroedura gracilis

Paroedura gracilis is both terrestrial and somewhat arboreal, and lives in the rainforest that spans the eastern coast of Madagascar.

- Paroedura homalorhinus
- Paroedura karstophila
- Paroedura lohatsara
- Paroedura maingoka

Paroedura maingoka survives in the dry-deciduous forest ecosystem of Madagascar.

- Paroedura manongavato
- Paroedura masobe

Paroedura masobe is an arboreal gecko that lives in the lowland forest habitat of Madagascar.

- Paroedura oviceps
- Paroedura picta

Paroedura picta are a terrestrial species that typically grow between 12 and 15 cm in length. They live in forests, savannahs, and a variety of semi-arid ecosystems with a temperature between 29 and 30 degrees Celsius during the day, and 24 to 26 degrees Celsius at night.

- Paroedura rennerae
- Paroedura sanctijohannis
- Paroedura stumpffi

Paroedura stumpffi is an arboreal gecko.

- Paroedura tanjaka

Paroedura tanjaka geckos make their home in the dry deciduous forests of Madagascar.

- Paroedura vahiny
- Paroedura vazimba

Paroedura vazimba survives only in the Zombitse-Vohibasia National Park of Madagascar.

== Phelsuma ==
The genus Phelsuma contains the day geckos. The name is a misnomer as they sometimes hunt at night, feeding on fruits, nectar, insects, invertebrates and sometimes small vertebrates. Most day geckos require a humidity between 50% and 85% to survive and a mean temperature of 18 degrees Celsius. The typical coloration consists of an olive, chartreuse, or turquoise with red spots.

- Phelsuma abbotti chekei

Phelsuma abbotti chekei grows to a maximum length of 15 cm. They live on the fringes of large forests, as well as mangrove forests, and seasonal dry forests. In an urbanized setting, they can live around residential sections.

- Phelsuma antanosy

Phelsuma antanosy grow to approximately 10 cm. These critically endangered geckos only live in three small, coastal forests on the southeastern portion of Madagascar.

- Phelsuma barbouri

Phelsuma is a highly terrestrial species of gecko that lives above the tree line in the Ankaratra and Andingitra mountains. This habitat's temperature can range from below freezing to 30 degrees Celsius.

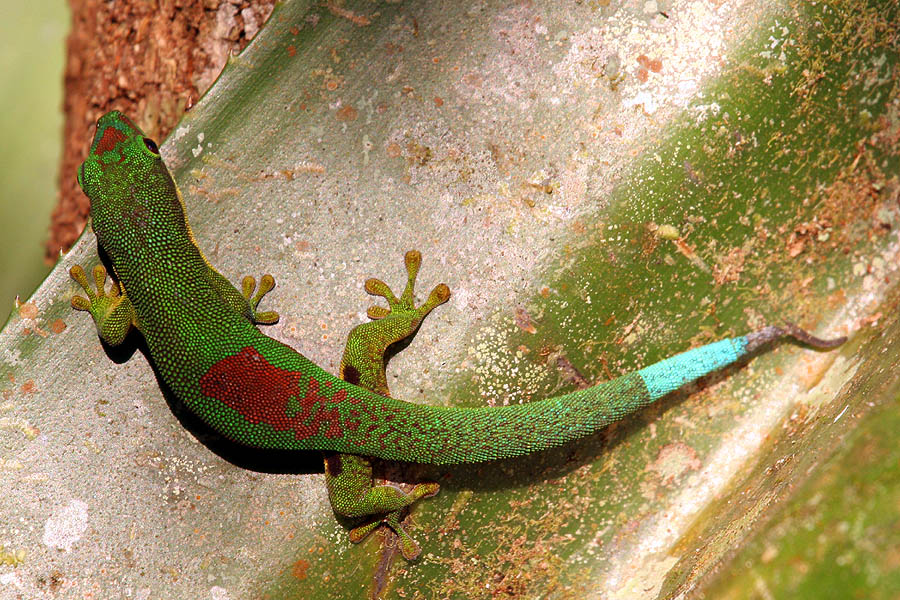
Phelsuma lineata lineata in Madagascar's Mantadia National Park at Andasibe.

- Phelsuma berghofi

Phelsuma lives in a coastal forest habitat where the humidity can easily rise to 100%. They live on the Ravanela madagascariensis plant where they retreat into the hollow leaves when they feel threatened.

- Phelsuma breviceps

Phelsuma breviceps survives in the dry deserts of southwestern Madagascar.

- Phelsuma dorsivittata

Phelsuma dorsivittata grows to approximately 13 cm in length. This species lives in northern Madagascar on broadleaf trees and on homes.

- Phelsuma dubia

Phelsuma dubia grow to 15 cm in length and inhabit the west coast of Madagascar in a wide variety of ecosystems.

- Phelsuma flavigularis

Phelsuma flavigularis lives in the Andisabe region at altitudes ranging from 900 and 1100 meters. The temperature in the region can vary from the upper 10's to 21 degrees on the Celsius scale with a humidity of approximately 95%.

- Phelsuma guttata

The speckled day gecko is an arboreal species of gecko that lives in the rainforests of Madagascar. They reach a length of approximately 12 cm.

- Phelsuma hielscheri
- Phelsuma kely

Phelsuma kely is an arboreal gecko that reaches a length of approximately 7 cm.

- Phelsuma klemmeri

Phelsuma klemmeri inhabit the bamboo forests of northwestern Madagascar and reach a length of approximately 9 cm.

- Phelsuma laticauda angularis

Phelsuma laticauda angularis is an arboreal gecko species that inhabits northwestern Madagascar in the Antsohihi region.

- Phelsuma laticauda laticauda

An arboreal subspecies of gecko that typically lives on banana trees, palms, and bamboo at the northern portion of Madagascar. It can grow to approximately 13 cm in length.

- Phelsuma lineata

Phelsuma lineata bombetokensis grows to approximately 10 cm in length. This subspecies inhabits newly planted vegetation such as palms in northern Madagascar due to complete destruction of its natural habitat.

Phelsuma lineata lineata inhabits the east coast of Madagascar.

Phelsuma lineata punctulata inhabits the mountain ecosystems in northern Madagascar. It grows to a length of approximately 13 cm.

- Phelsuma madagascariensis boehmei

This arboreal species inhabits the rainforests of Eastern Madagascar. This species can grow to about 22 cm in length.

- Phelsuma madagascariensis grandis

The Madagascar giant day gecko is an arboreal species that lives primarily on trees in high humidity environments. This species grows to approximately 28 cm in length.

- Phelsuma madagascariensis kochi

Koch's giant day gecko is an arboreal species of northwest and western Madagascar. This species can comfortably live in a dry climate where the temperature can reach 40 degrees Celsius.

- Phelsuma madagascariensis madagascariensis

The Madagascar day gecko is an arboreal species that is endemic to the rainforests of East Madagascar. This species can grow to about 22 cm in length.

- Phelsuma malamakibo

Phelsuma malamakibo is a terrestrial species that inhabits the evergreen rainforests, montane grassland, and heathland of southern Madagascar.

- Phelsuma masohoala

Phelsuma masohoala inhabits eastern and northeastern Madagascar.

- Phelsuma modesta

Phelsuma modesta inhabit southern and western Madagascar.

- Phelsuma mutabilis

Phelsuma mutabilis inhabit southern and eastern Madagascar.

- Phelsuma parva

Phelsuma parva is an arboreal species of gecko that inhabits the northeastern region of Madagascar. It can grow to a length of 9 cm and commonly lives in coconut palms, banana plants, and residential areas.

- Phelsuma pronki

Phelsuma pronki is an arboreal species of gecko that inhabits the rainforests of central Madagascar.

- Phelsuma pusilla hallmanni

Phelsuma pusilla hallmanni is an arboreal species that inhabits eastern Madagascar.

- Phelsuma pusilla pusilla

Phelsuma pusilla pusilla is an arboreal gecko that inhabits eastern Madagascar. It grows to approximately 7.6 cm.

- Phelsuma quadriocellata bimaculata

Phelsuma quadriocellata bimaculata is an arboreal subspecies of gecko that inhabits eastern Madagascar and grows to 11 cm.

- Phelsuma quadriocellata lepida

Phelsuma quadriocellata lepida is a subspecies of gecko that lives in the rainforests of northeastern Madagascar up to a maximum elevation of 1200 metres.

- Phelsuma quadriocellata quadriocellata

The Four Spot Day Gecko inhabits the inland rainforests along the eastern side of Madagascar.

- Phelsuma seippi

Seipp's day gecko is an arboreal species that inhabits the rainforests of north Madagascar. It has the peculiar habit for a reptile of avoiding sunlight.

- Phelsuma serraticauda

The flat-tailed day gecko is an arboreal species that inhabits the rainforests of eastern Madagascar. The males can grow to a maximum length of 15 cm.

- Phelsuma standingi

Phelsuma standingi is an arboreal species that inhabits the dry thorn forests of southwestern Madagascar. They can grow to a maximum length of 1 foot; however, individuals ranging between 20 and 27 cm are more common.

- Phelsuma vanheygeni

Phelsuma vanheygeni only inhabits the bamboo forest on the Ampasindava peninsula of Madagascar and often rests on the stalks of the bamboo. This species grows to approximately 7.6 cm length.

== Uroplatus ==
Uroplatus is genus of geckos ranging in size from 4" to 12". These geckos are camouflaged by coloration, patterns, as well as structures on their bodies in order to resemble their habitat and camouflage themselves almost completely. Uroplatus geckos require an approximate humidity of 80% and an average temperature between 21 and 27 degrees Celsius. Many Uroplatus species are arboreal, however Uroplatus ebenaui and Uroplatus phantasticus live in the foliage near the ground.

- Uroplatus ebenaui

The Spearpoint leaf-tailed gecko's specific camouflage is designed to mimic a dried leaf. They occur in the eastern rainforest belt of Madagascar and must have a habitat with a temperature of 16–21 degrees Celsius and 80–100% humidity.

- Uroplatus fimbriatus

This nocturnal species of gecko lives along the entire east coast of Madagascar. It requires regions with a humidity between 70% and 100%, a temperature of at least 22 degrees Celsius and up to 30 degrees Celsius.

- Uroplatus garamaso

Uroplatus garamaso is endemic to northern Madagascar and was not recognized as a distinct species from Uroplatus henkeli until 2023.

- Uroplatus guentheri

Uroplatus guentheri is an arboreal species that occurs in northwestern and western Madagascar and can grow to 15 cm

- Uroplatus henkeli

This species inhabits the humid rainforests of northern Madagascar. They typically grow to a length between 25 and 30 cm.

- Uroplatus lineatus

Uroplatus lineatus inhabits the bamboo forests of northeast Madagascar and typically grow to 25 cm in length.

- Uroplatus malahelo

Uroplatus malahelo was discovered in the Malahelo forest of southeastern Madagascar in 1992; however, it may be extinct due to only 2 specimens being discovered.

- Uroplatus malama

Uroplatus malama was discovered in a low-montane forest; however, only one specimen is known to exist and this species may be extinct.

- Uroplatus phantasticus

Uroplatus phantasticus occurs in eastern Madagascar and typically grows from 13 to 15 cm in length. In order to survive, their habitat must be between 18 and 27 degrees Celsius at the extremes, but an average temperature between 70 and 75 degrees must also be present as well as a humidity between 75% and 90%, although a humidity between 80% and 90% is more inhabitable.

- Uroplatus sikorae

Uroplatus sikorae is an arboreal gecko that occurs in the rainforest belt of eastern Madagascar. This species can grow to approximately 18 cm in length and has the feature of flaps on the underside of its head in order to blur its outline when pressed against a tree to hide from predators more effectively.
