= Phelsuma kely =

Conservation status
- Data Deficient (IUCN 3.1)

Scientific classification
- Kingdom: Animalia
- Phylum: Chordata
- Class: Reptilia
- Order: Squamata
- Suborder: Gekkota
- Family: Gekkonidae
- Genus: Phelsuma
- Species: P. kely

Binomial name
- Phelsuma kely Schönecker, Bach & Glaw, 2004
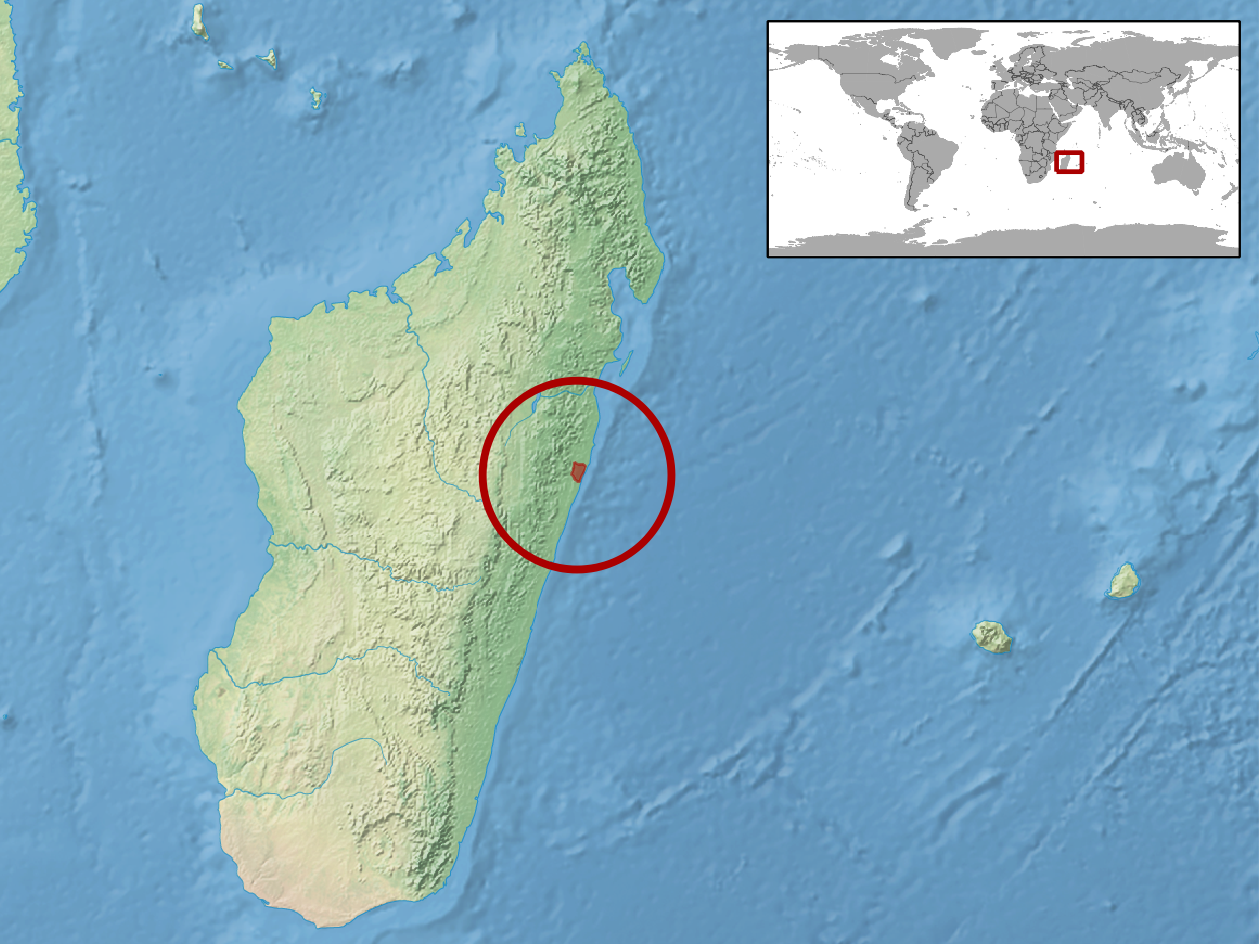

Species of lizard

Phelsuma kely is a species of diurnal gecko. It is endemic to Madagascar and is known from the central east coast of Madagascar, south of Tamatave. It typically inhabits dragon trees. The gecko feeds on insects and probably nectar.

Little is known of this species, and it is known only from a single locality. It was first scientifically described in 2004. The IUCN declines to classify it as endangered or otherwise, citing "no information on its distribution, population status or threats".

== Appearance ==
It is the smallest known day gecko, reaching a total length of about 7.1 cm. Its body colour is variable and dependent on the mood of the animal. During activity, the basic body colour is white-gray with a black pattern on the back. However, the body colour can turn dark also. A black lateral stripe extends from the eye to the tail. The ventral side is grayish-white.

== Distribution ==
This species inhabits the central east coast of Madagascar, south of Tamatave. It is only known from the area around Lac Ampitabe.

== Habitat ==
P. kely is found on dragon trees. It shares its habitat with Phelsuma seippi, Phelsuma guttata, Phelsuma lineata, Phelsuma madagascariensis madagascariensis, Phelsuma quadriocellata, Phelsuma abbotti chekei, Phelsuma dubia, Phelsuma laticauda laticauda and Phelsuma madagascariensis grandis. All these species live sympatrically and partly syntopically. In March, the daytime temperature is around 27 °C and drops to around 23 °C at nighttime. The relative humidity is between 80 and 90%.

== Diet ==
These day geckos feed on various insects and other invertebrates. Like many members of the genus Phelsuma, this species might also feed on pollen and nectar.

== Behaviour ==
This Phelsuma species is very shy.

== Reproduction ==
In captivity, the females lay a pair of eggs which measure about 7 x 6 mm. At a temperature of 28 °C during the day and 22 °C at night, the young will hatch after approximately 60 days. The juveniles have a total length of about 25–28 mm.

== Captivity ==
These geckos have been commercially traded, sometimes misidentified as Lygodactylus spp.

These animals should be housed in pairs in a well planted terrarium. The temperature should be between about 28 °C during the day and around 20 °C at nighttime. The relative humidity should be maintained between 80 and 90%. In captivity, these animals can be fed with crickets, wax moths, fruit flies, mealworms and houseflies.
