= Comoran fish scale gecko =

Scientific classification
- Kingdom: Animalia
- Phylum: Chordata
- Class: Reptilia
- Order: Squamata
- Suborder: Gekkota
- Family: Gekkonidae
- Genus: Geckolepis
- Species: G. humbloti

Binomial name
- Geckolepis humbloti Vaillant, 1887

Species of lizard

The Comoran fish scale gecko (Geckolepis humbloti), is a nocturnal species of lizard in the family Gekkonidae. It is endemic to Grande Comore in the Comoros and Madagascar.

Originally described in 1887, this species was synonymized with Geckolepis maculata in 1942. It was later resurrected in 2015, following various subsequent scientific studies and expeditions. Hawlitschek et al. (2015) resurrected G. humbloti when it was determined to be paraphyletic based on DNA data, separating the species from G. maculata once again.

Like the rest of its genus, G. humbloti sheds its skin and scales as a defensive measure, just as many other geckos will shed their tails. These scales typically grow back over the course of several months.
