= Matoatoa spannringi =

Conservation status
- Data Deficient (IUCN 3.1)

Scientific classification
- Kingdom: Animalia
- Phylum: Chordata
- Class: Reptilia
- Order: Squamata
- Suborder: Gekkota
- Family: Gekkonidae
- Genus: Matoatoa
- Species: M. spannringi

Binomial name
- Matoatoa spannringi Nussbaum, Raxworthy & Pronk, 1998
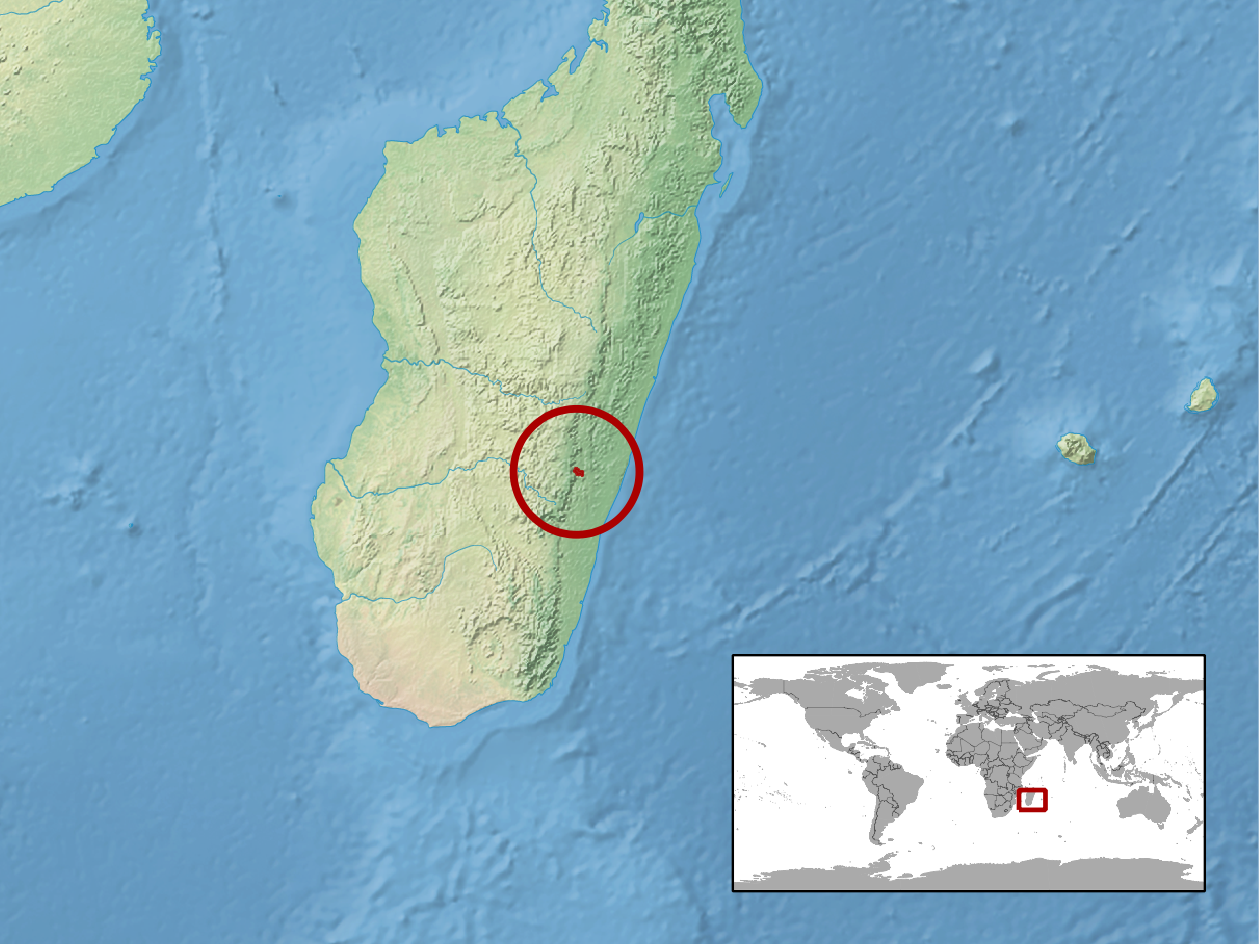

Species of lizard

Matoatoa spannringi is a species of gecko part of the lizard family Gekkonidae. The species is endemic to Madagascar.

== Etymology ==
The specific name, spannringi, honors botanist Jürgen Spannring, who collected the holotype.

== Geographic range ==
M. spannringi is found in southeastern Madagascar.

== Habitat ==
The preferred natural habitat of M. spannringi is the forest, at an altitude of 600 m (2,000 ft).

== Description ==
M. spannringi may attain a snout-to-vent length (SVL) of 5.8 cm (2.3 in).

== Reproduction ==
M. spannringi is oviparous.
