= Matoatoa brevipes =

Conservation status
- Vulnerable (IUCN 3.1)

Scientific classification
- Kingdom: Animalia
- Phylum: Chordata
- Class: Reptilia
- Order: Squamata
- Suborder: Gekkota
- Family: Gekkonidae
- Genus: Matoatoa
- Species: M. brevipes

Binomial name
- Matoatoa brevipes (Mocquard, 1900)
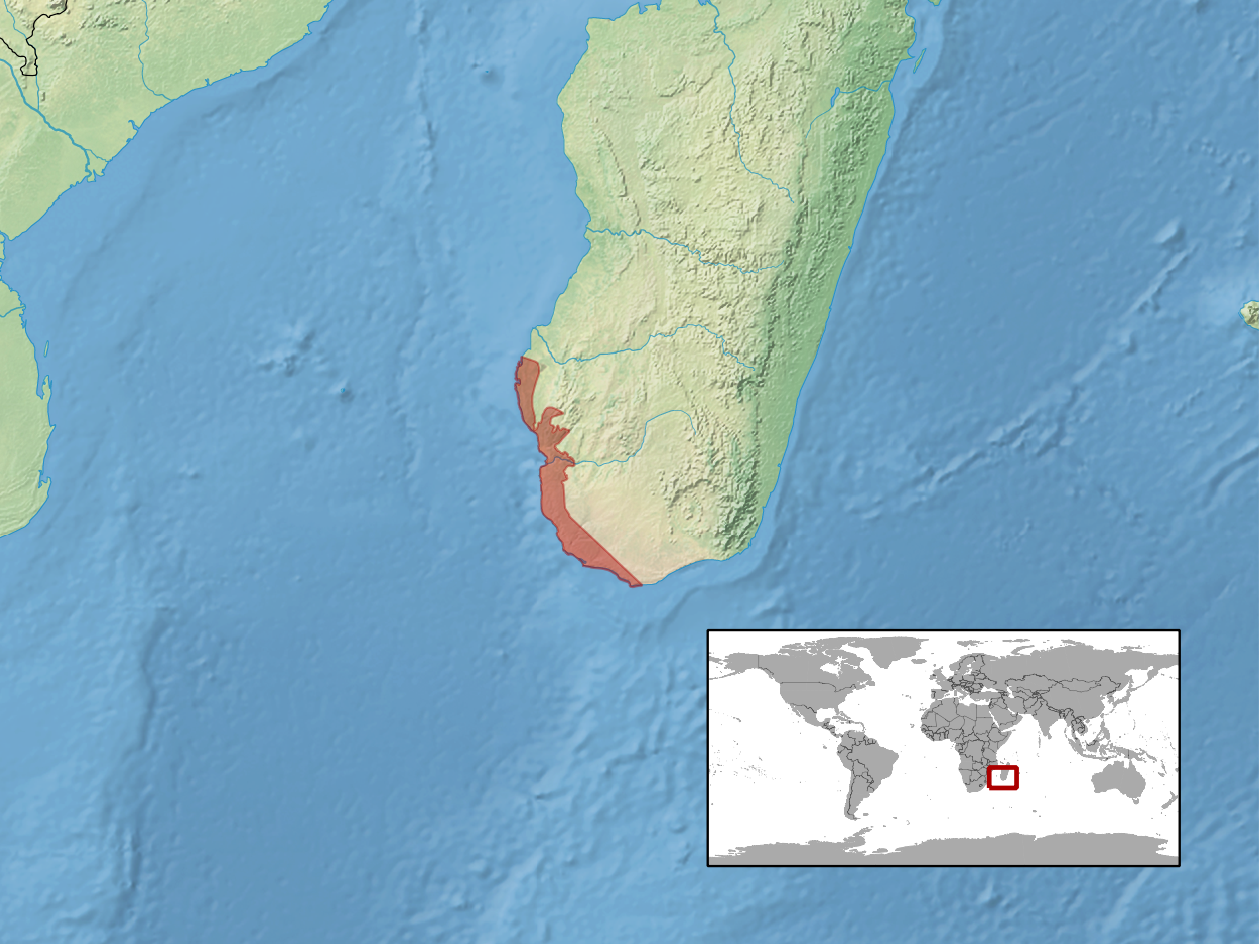

Synonyms
- Phyllodactylus brevipes Mocquard, 1900; Phyllodactylus porphyreus brevipes — Kluge, 1993; Matoatoa brevipes — Nussbaum, Raxworthy & Pronk, 1998

Species of lizard

Matoatoa brevipes is a species of gecko, a lizard in the family Gekkonidae. The species is endemic to Madagascar.

== Geographic range ==
M. brevipes is found along the southwestern coast of Madagascar.

== Habitat ==
M. brevipes is found in hollow tree branches within dry open spiny forest.

== Behavior ==
M. brevipes is a nocturnal species.
