= Matoatoa =

Scientific classification
- Kingdom: Animalia
- Phylum: Chordata
- Class: Reptilia
- Order: Squamata
- Suborder: Gekkota
- Family: Gekkonidae
- Subfamily: Uroplatinae
- Genus: Matoatoa; Nussbaum, Raxworthy & Pronk, 1998
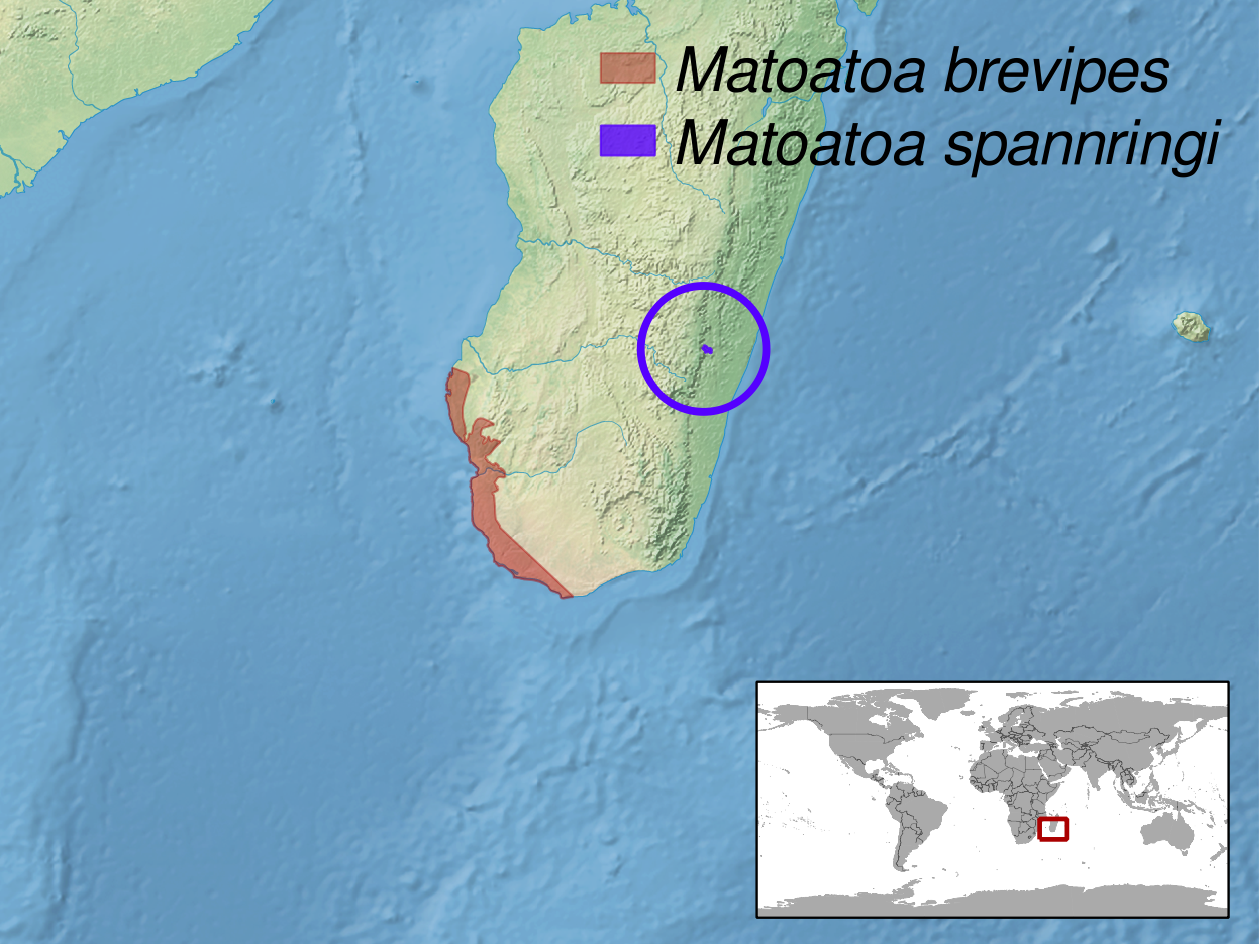

Genus of lizards

Matoatoa is a small genus of geckos, lizards in the family Gekkonidae. The genus is endemic to Madagascar.

== Species ==
There are two recognized species:

- Matoatoa brevipes (Mocquard, 1900)
- Matoatoa spannringi Nussbaum, Raxworthy & Pronk, 1998

Nota bene: A binomial authority in parentheses indicates that the species was originally described in a genus other than Matoatoa.
