= Phelsuma pusilla pusilla =

Scientific classification
- Kingdom: Animalia
- Phylum: Chordata
- Class: Reptilia
- Order: Squamata
- Suborder: Gekkota
- Family: Gekkonidae
- Genus: Phelsuma
- Species: P. pusilla
- Subspecies: P. p. pusilla

Trinomial name
- Phelsuma pusilla pusilla Mertens, 1964

Subspecies of lizard

Phelsuma pusilla pusilla is a diurnal gecko and lives in eastern Madagascar. It typically inhabits different trees and houses. This day gecko feeds on insects and nectar.

== Scientific synonyms ==
- Phelsuma lineata pusilla Mertens, 1964
- Phelsuma pusilla Meier, 1989
- Phelsuma pusilla pusilla Glaw & Vences, 1994

== Description ==
The lizard belongs to the smallest day geckos and can reach a total length of about 8 cm. The body colour is lime green, with red dots on the back and brown or black flanks. The tail has a blue hue and can be turquoise. The ventral side is white.

== Distribution and habitat ==
Phelsuma pusilla pusilla lives in the moist and warm climate of the east coast of Madagascar, where it was first found in the region around Abila Lemaitso near Brickaville, but also occurs on the island Nosy Bohara. It inhabits different small trees and also occurs on banana trees, often close to human dwellings.

== Diet ==
Various insects and other invertebrates. They also like to lick soft, sweet fruit, pollen and nectar.

== Behaviour ==
These geckos are quite quarrelsome and do not accept other males. In captivity, where the females cannot escape, the males can also sometimes seriously wound a females. In this case the male and female must be separated.

== Care and maintenance in captivity ==
These animals should be housed in pairs and need a well planted terrarium. The temperature should be about 28 °C (locally around 30 °C) during the day and drop to around 20 °C at night. The humidity should be maintained between 75 and 80% during the day. It is also important to include two colder months with a daytime temperature of 24 °C and 16 °C at night. In captivity, these animals can be fed with crickets, wax moth larvae, fruit flies, mealworms and houseflies.
