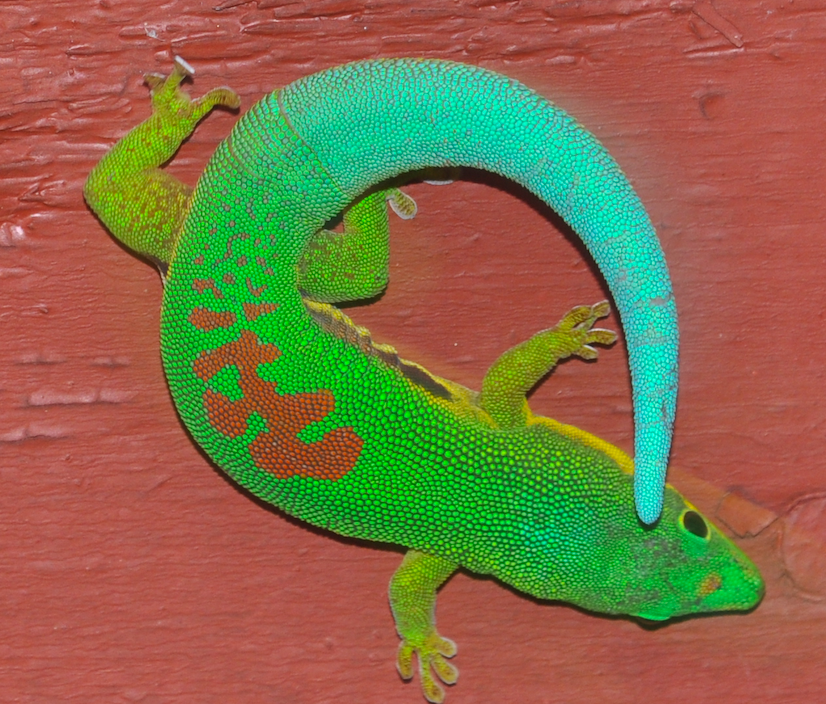
- Phelsuma lineata lineata

Conservation status
- Least Concern (IUCN 3.1)

Scientific classification
- Kingdom: Animalia
- Phylum: Chordata
- Order: Squamata
- Suborder: Gekkota
- Family: Gekkonidae
- Genus: Phelsuma
- Species: P. lineata

Binomial name
- Phelsuma lineata Gray, 1842

Synonyms
- Phelsuma lineatum Gray, 1842; Phelsuma minuthi Börner, 1980

= Phelsuma lineata =

Species of lizard

Phelsuma lineata, also known commonly as the lined day gecko, is a species of diurnal gecko in the family Gekkonidae. The species is native to Madagascar. It has also been introduced to Réunion.

This species as described appears to be a conglomeration of many distinct forms. Three of these are recognized subspecies (ssp. lineata; ssp. bombetokensis Mertens, 1964; and ssp. punctulata Mertens, 1970), but others could be separate taxa that should be elevated to species status as was Phelsuma dorsivittata. Phelsuma lineata is not threatened, but some unknown subspecies may be.

== Description ==
The lined day gecko commonly measures 4–6 inches (10–15 cm) in total length (tail included). Males are more colorful than females, having a medium-green base color, red splotches on the lower back and head, and a brown to black lateral band on each side. The tail may be blue. The underside is pale.

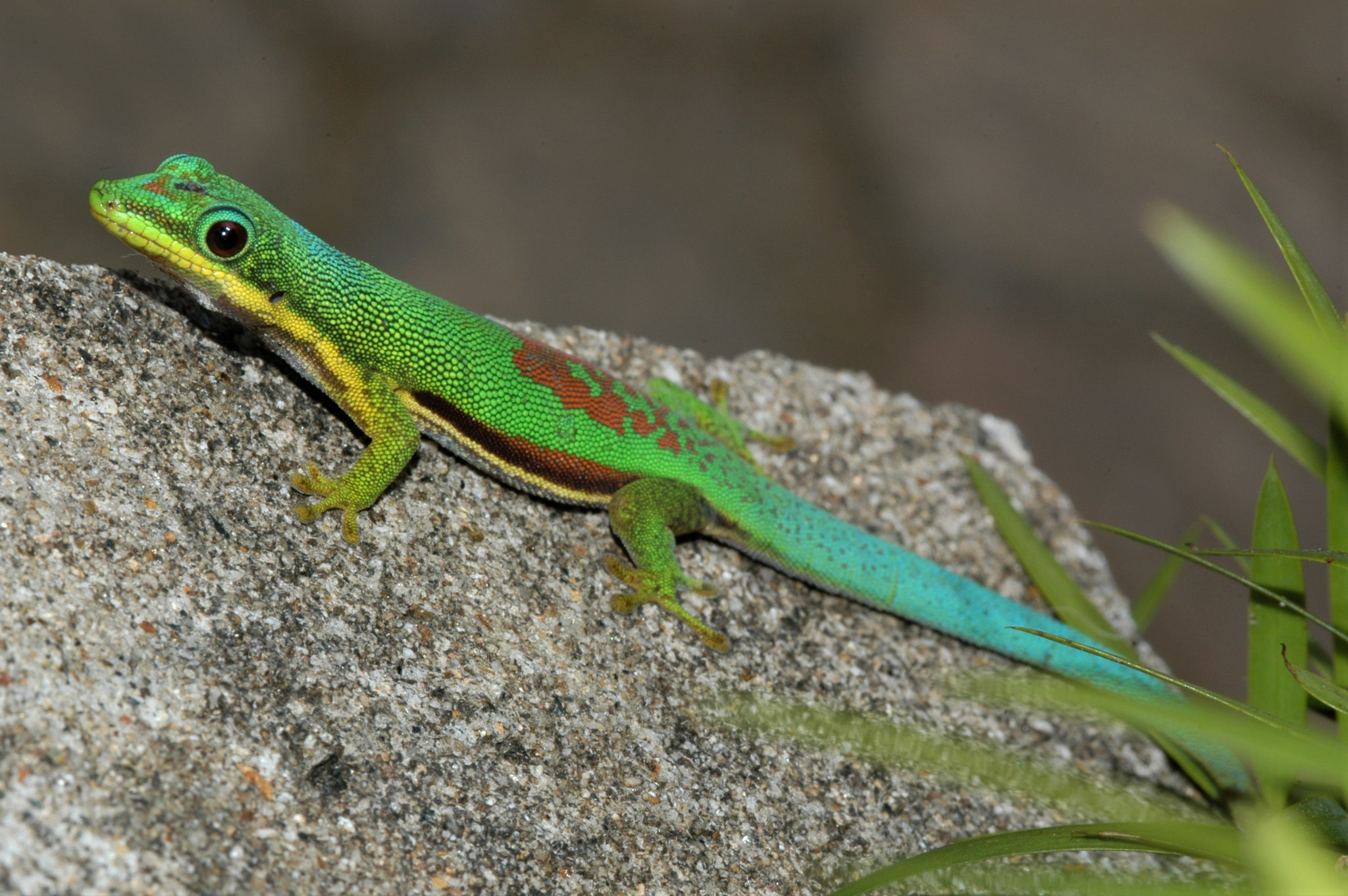

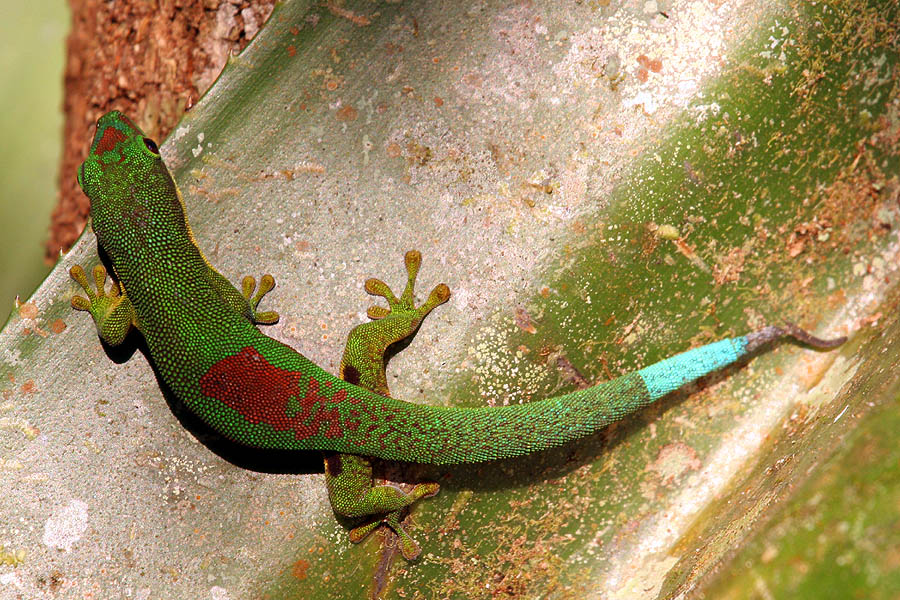

== Distribution and habitat ==
The lined day gecko prefers to reside in humid subtropical climatic zones along northern and eastern parts of Madagascar. The lined day gecko and its subspecies can be found in both mid-elevated and low-elevated sites along the east coast of the island.

== Reproduction ==
Phelsuma lineata is oviparous.
