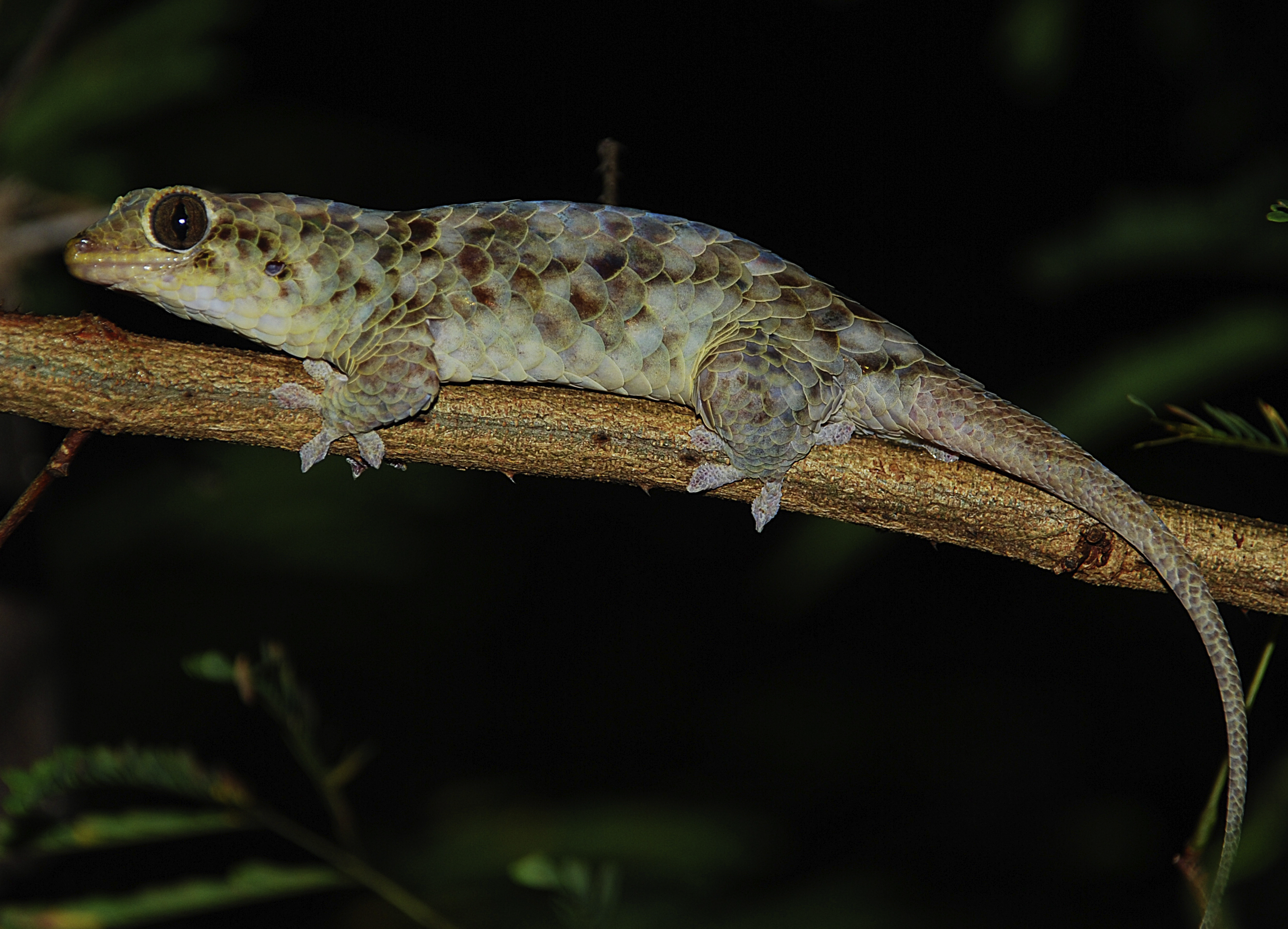
- Geckolepis megalepis

Scientific classification
- Kingdom: Animalia
- Phylum: Chordata
- Class: Reptilia
- Order: Squamata
- Suborder: Gekkota
- Family: Gekkonidae
- Subfamily: Uroplatinae
- Genus: Geckolepis; Grandidier, 1867

Type species
- Geckolepis typica Grandidier, 1867
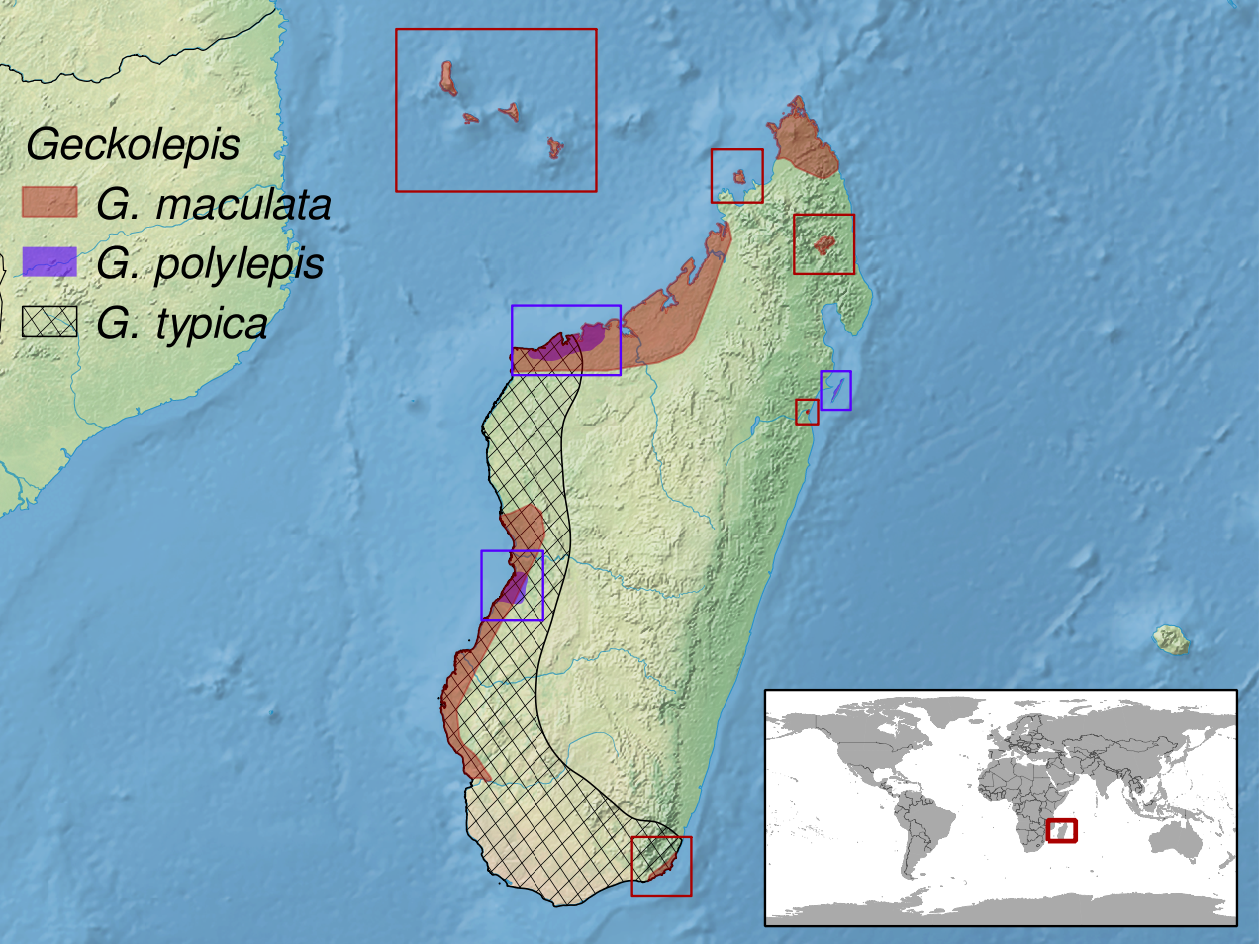

= Geckolepis =

Genus of lizards

Geckolepis is a genus of geckos, commonly referred to as fish scale geckos, which are endemic to Madagascar and the Comoro Islands. They are nocturnal, arboreal, insectivorous lizards, found in primary and secondary forest, as well as degraded habitats. They are best known for their ability to lose their skin and scales when grasped by a predator.

== Taxonomy ==
The genus Geckolepis has difficult taxonomy due to variable pholidosis. Recent taxonomic and genetic investigation have shown that several cryptic species are present in this genus. In 2016, Hawlitschek et al. resurrected G. humbloti from synonymy with G. maculata, as a species endemic to the Comoro Islands. In 2017, Scherz et al. (2017) described G. megalepis from the limestone pinnacle karst formations of Ankarana National Park—this species has larger scales than all other members of the genus, but it was also identified based on its osteology. The taxonomic identity of G. maculata remains uncertain.

== Species ==
The following five species are recognized:

- Peters's spotted gecko or fish-scale gecko, Geckolepis maculata Peters, 1880
- Comoran fish scale gecko, Geckolepis humbloti Vaillant, 1887
- Many-scaled gecko, Geckolepis polylepis Boettger, 1893
- Grandidier's gecko, Geckolepis typica Grandidier, 1867
- Geckolepis megalepis Scherz et al., 2017

== Skin and scales ==
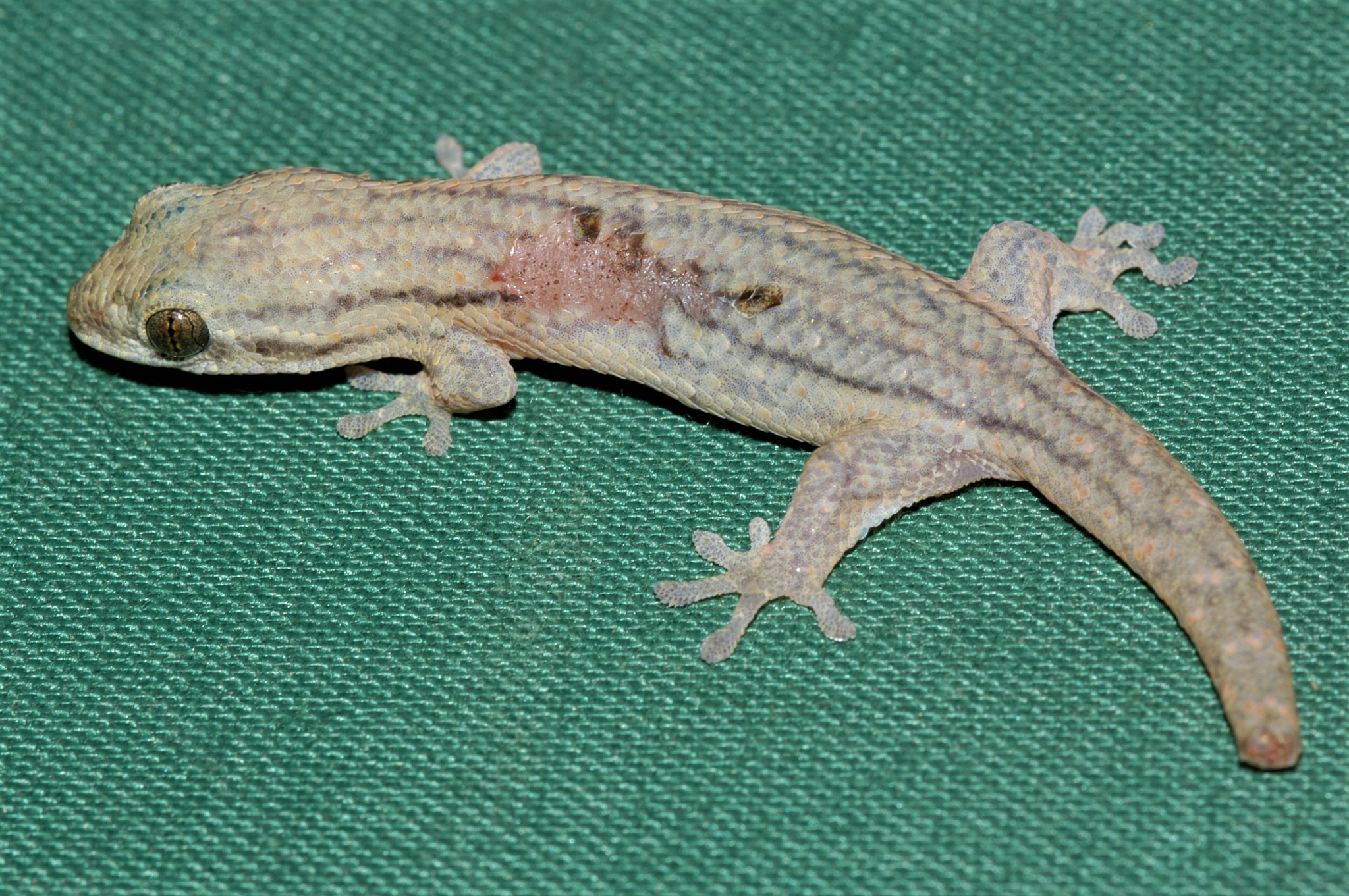
A fish scale gecko showing both autotomized scales and tail

The scales of Geckolepis are imbricated (overlapping) and ossified. Histological studies on the scales were performed as early as 1911 by Wilhelm Josef Schmidt. Schmidt noted the heterogeneity and imbrication of the scales, which makes meristics difficult on Geckolepis. Schmidt noted that the imbrication of the scales was a result of their folding, essentially being bilayered rather than monolayered. He showed also that the scale centres are ossified, formed from irregular crystals, which he illustrated in some detail. In their micro-CT scans, Scherz et al. found that the scales of G. megalepis and other species have the same degree of x-ray attenuation as bone, and concluded that this suggested the presence of osteoderm as well. They noted that, like in Schmidt's illustrations, a zone toward the tip of the scales lacks ossifications as visible in micro-CT scans. Paluh et al. studied the osteoderm of Geckolepis cf. maculata using micro-CT and histology, and compared it to other geckos known to have osteoderm, namely Gekko gecko and Tarentola mauritanica. They found that the osteoderms differ strongly from those of the other gecko species that possess them, and represent a third independent convergent derivation of osteoderm in geckos. The osteoderm of Geckolepis somewhat resembles that of the Gerrhosauridae or 'plated lizards'.

The scales of Geckolepis were known to come off already in the 19th century; Alfred Voeltzkow in 1983 described capturing specimens with bundles of cotton to avoid the scales coming off. Once lost, scales are regenerated, and eventually the regenerated scales are indistinguishable from original ones. The mechanism for this scale autotomy and the subsequent regeneration is not well understood, but was studied by C. Schubert and colleagues. These studies showed that it is not only the scales that are shed in the 'dermolytic autotomy' of Geckolepis, but rather, there is a preformed splitting zone between the integument and the underlying connective tissue. They also showed that the dermolytic process is an active one, wherein a network of myofibroblasts in the splitting zone probably contract, followed by vasoconstriction to minimise blood loss. Their findings were questioned by Aaron Matthew Bauer and colleagues, but only based on comparative evidence from other geckos, which all have splitting zones within the integument, and not below it. Indeed, no subsequent studies have yet looked at this mechanism again, but there have been repeated calls for such investigation, especially as the regenerative properties may have relevance for human medicine.
