= Tiny scaled gecko =

Conservation status
- Vulnerable (IUCN 3.1)

Scientific classification
- Kingdom: Animalia
- Phylum: Chordata
- Class: Reptilia
- Order: Squamata
- Suborder: Gekkota
- Family: Gekkonidae
- Genus: Lygodactylus
- Species: L. bivittis

Binomial name
- Lygodactylus bivittis (W. Peters, 1883)
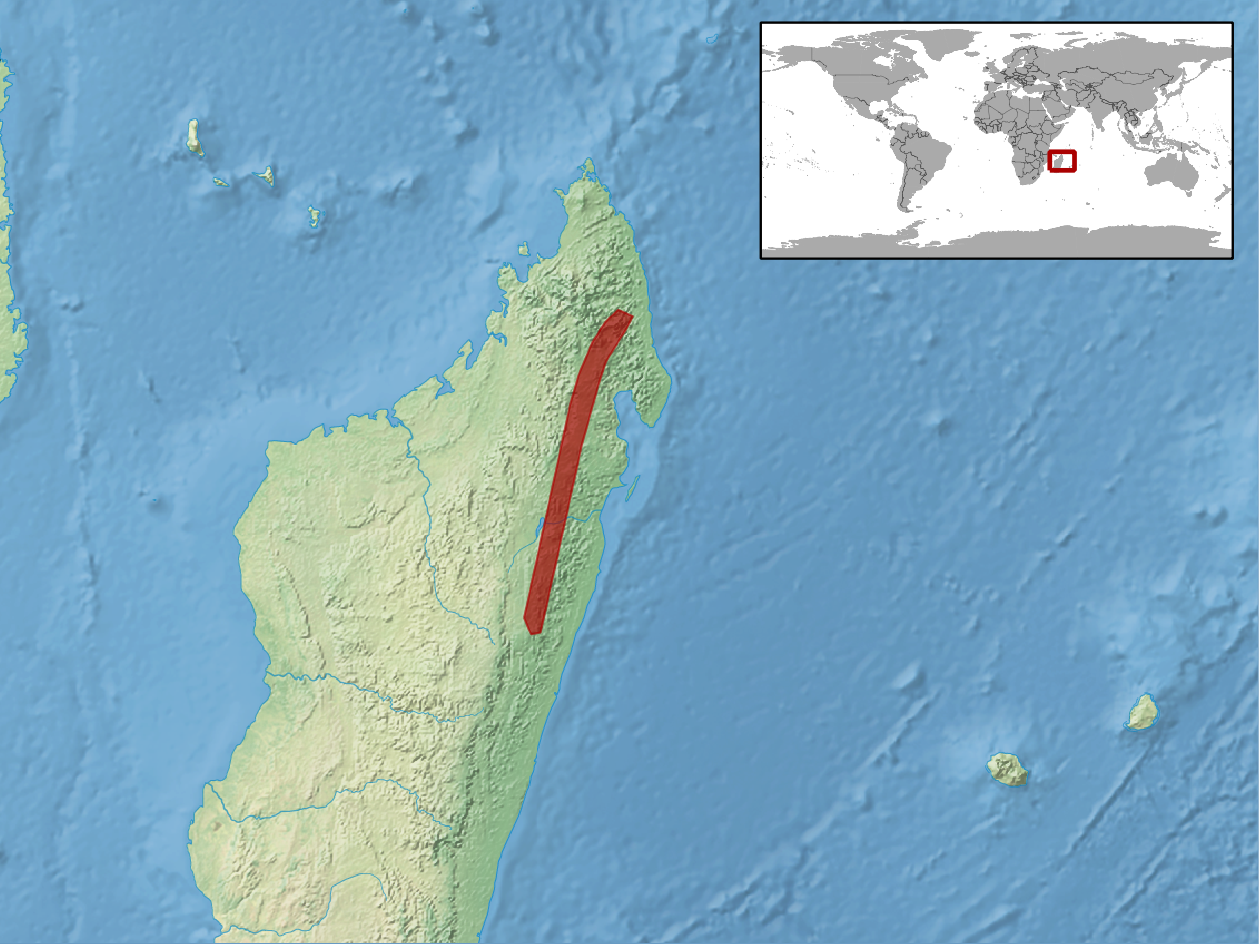

Synonyms
- Scalabotes bivittis W. Peters, 1883; Scalabotes hildebrandti W. Peters, 1883; Microscalabotes cowanii Boulenger, 1883; Lygodactylus bivittis — Boulenger, 1885; Lygodactylus hildebrandti — Boulenger, 1885; Microscalabotes bivittis — Kluge, 1993; Lygodactylus bivittis — Röll et al., 2010

Species of lizard

The tiny scaled gecko (Lygodactylus bivittis) is a species of lizard in the family Gekkonidae. The species is endemic to Madagascar.

== Taxonomy ==
L. bivittis was formerly placed in a monotypic genus Microscalabotes. However, molecular data suggested that Microscalabotes is nested within Lygodactylus, and the genus was synonymized.

== Habitat and behavior ==
L. bivittis occurs in low and mid-elevation humid forests at elevations of 300–1,000 m (980–3,280 ft) above sea level. It is diurnal and lives in trees. It does not occur in heavily degraded areas and is threatened by the loss and degradation of humid forests in eastern Madagascar.

== Reproduction ==
L. bivittis is oviparous.
