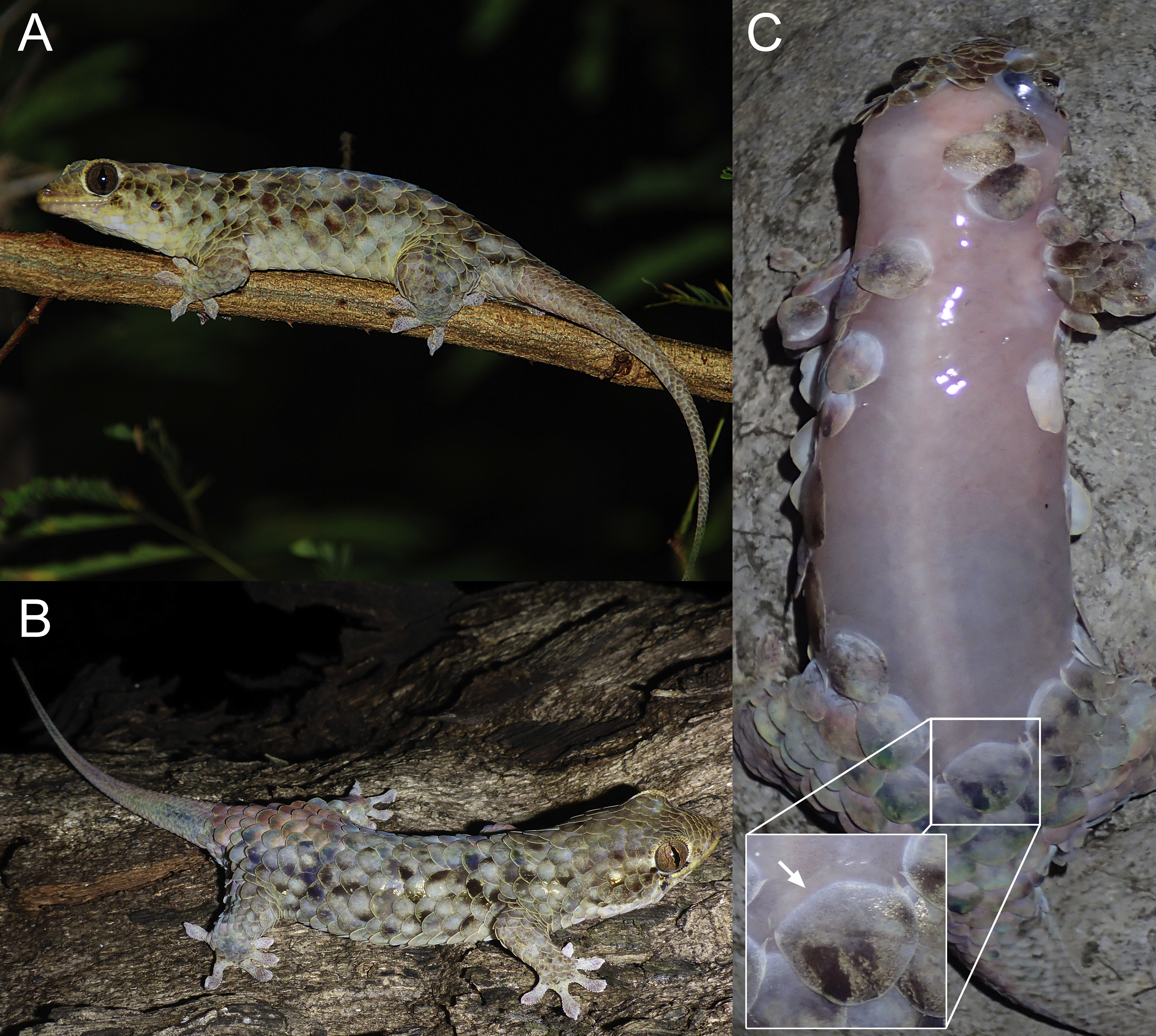
- A & B: Adults with scales intact C: Adult without scales

Scientific classification
- Kingdom: Animalia
- Phylum: Chordata
- Class: Reptilia
- Order: Squamata
- Suborder: Gekkota
- Family: Gekkonidae
- Genus: Geckolepis
- Species: G. megalepis

Binomial name
- Geckolepis megalepis Scherz, Daza, Köhler, Vences & Glaw, 2017

= Geckolepis megalepis =

Species of lizard

Geckolepis megalepis is a species of gecko found in the limestone karst formations of northern Madagascar. It is the first addition to the Geckolepis genus since 1942. This species of gecko has the largest scales of any known gecko and can detach them as a defence mechanism when a predator attacks, leaving the predator with a mouthful of scales rather than itself; a character it shares with all other members of the genus Geckolepis. Its scales were reported to come away with greater ease than its congeners.

== Distribution and conservation status ==
Geckolepis megalepis was described from Ankarana National Park. It is thought to be restricted to the tsingy karst formations of this park. It was proposed to be Near Threatened in its original description, due to ongoing anthropogenic degradation of its habitat, but probable resilience to these changes.

== Defense mechanism ==
Geckolepis megalepis has remarkably large scales (hence the specific epithet 'megalepis', from the Greek words for "very large scales") and an extreme variation of integumentary autotomy. Myofibroblastic contraction in a pre-formed splitting-zone sheds the keratinized epidermis, connective tissues and subcutaneous fat tissue. Typical integumentary autotomy in squamates only includes the keratinized epidermis, thus distinguishing the de-scalation methods of G. megalepis. Scarless regeneration of the entire denuded integument occurs within several weeks, resuming superficial scalation patterns. The skin, being so easily shed, became difficult for scientists attempting captures or studies without causing structural damage to the epidermis. Eventually they were able to come up with a way to collect them, and discovered that the species' scales are dense and mineralized (though not recognized by the authors as osteoderms). Dermolytic scale autotomy in G. megalepis has remained poorly recorded thus far, only being witnessed in an anti-predator setting with a Blaesodactylus gecko. Further documentation of the autotomy process is required to better understand the origins of regeneration and associated morphological characters in Geckolepis.

== Ecology ==
Little to nothing is known of the ecology of Geckolepis megalepis, except that it is nocturnal, arboreal, and insectivorous.
