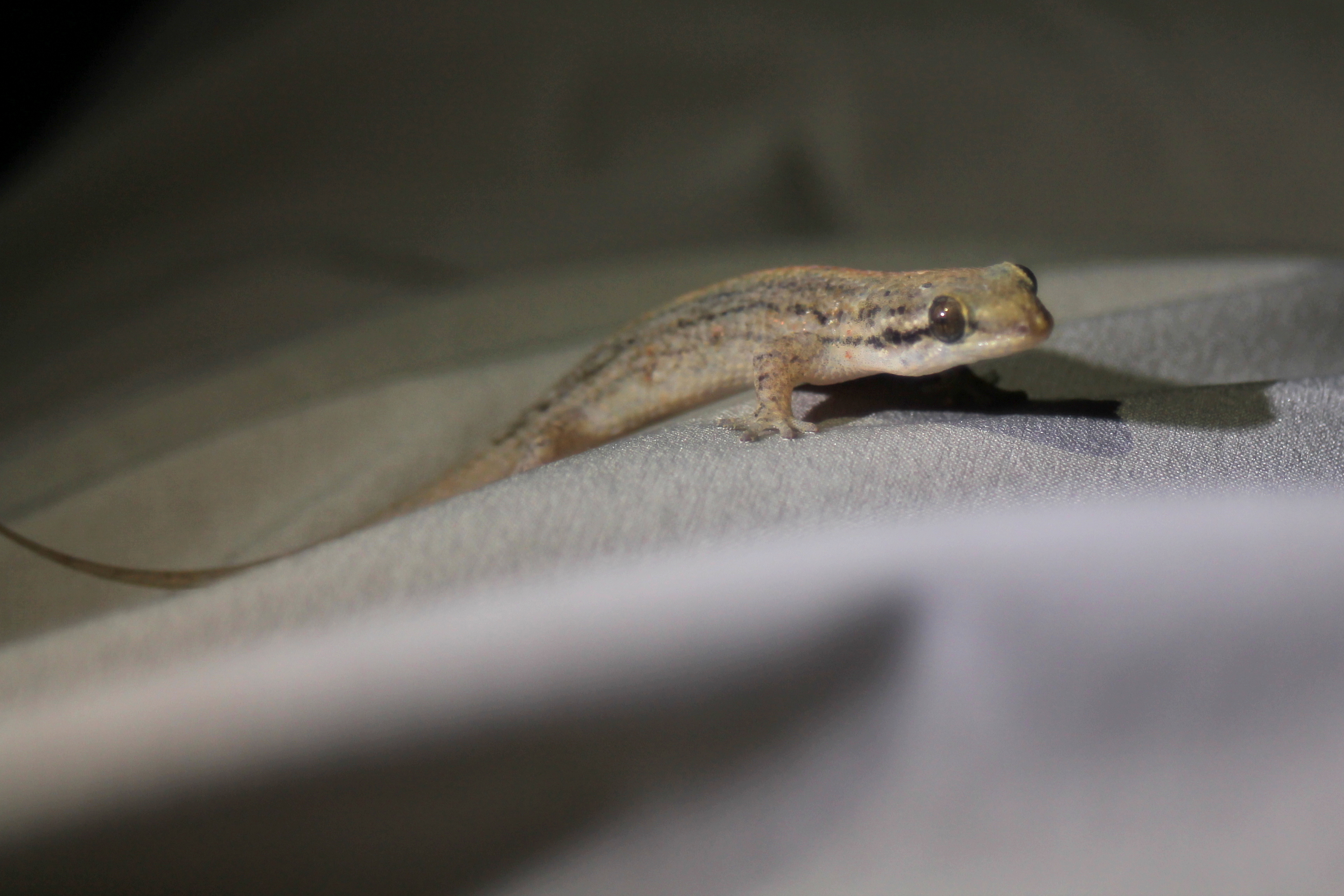

Conservation status
- Data Deficient (IUCN 3.1)

Scientific classification
- Kingdom: Animalia
- Phylum: Chordata
- Class: Reptilia
- Order: Squamata
- Suborder: Gekkota
- Family: Gekkonidae
- Genus: Geckolepis
- Species: G. polylepis

Binomial name
- Geckolepis polylepis Boettger, 1893
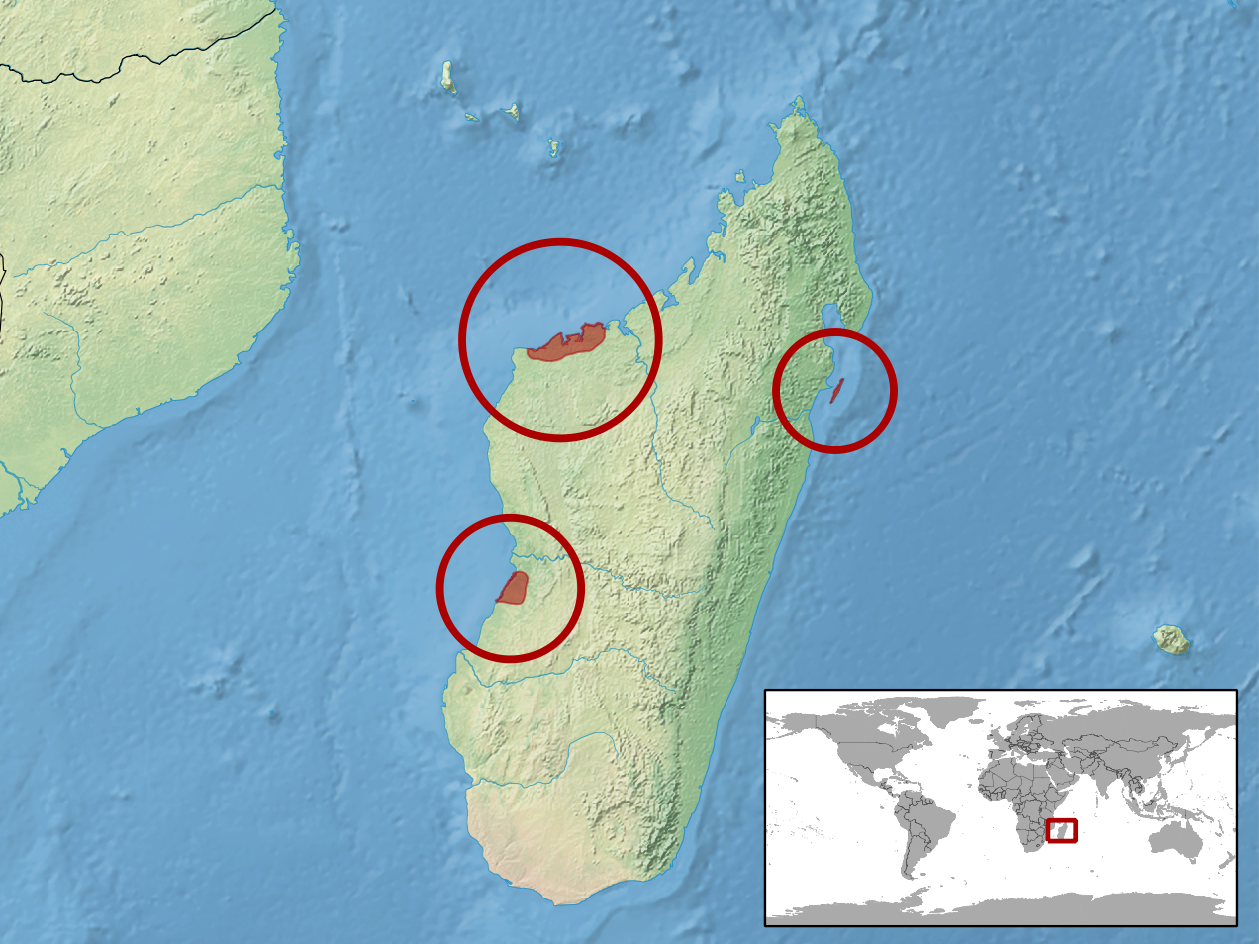

= Many-scaled gecko =

Species of lizard

The many-scaled gecko (Geckolepis polylepis) is a species of lizard in the family Gekkonidae. It is endemic to western Madagascar.
