= Grandidier's gecko =

Conservation status
- Least Concern (IUCN 3.1)

Scientific classification
- Kingdom: Animalia
- Phylum: Chordata
- Class: Reptilia
- Order: Squamata
- Suborder: Gekkota
- Family: Gekkonidae
- Genus: Geckolepis
- Species: G. typica

Binomial name
- Geckolepis typica Grandidier, 1867
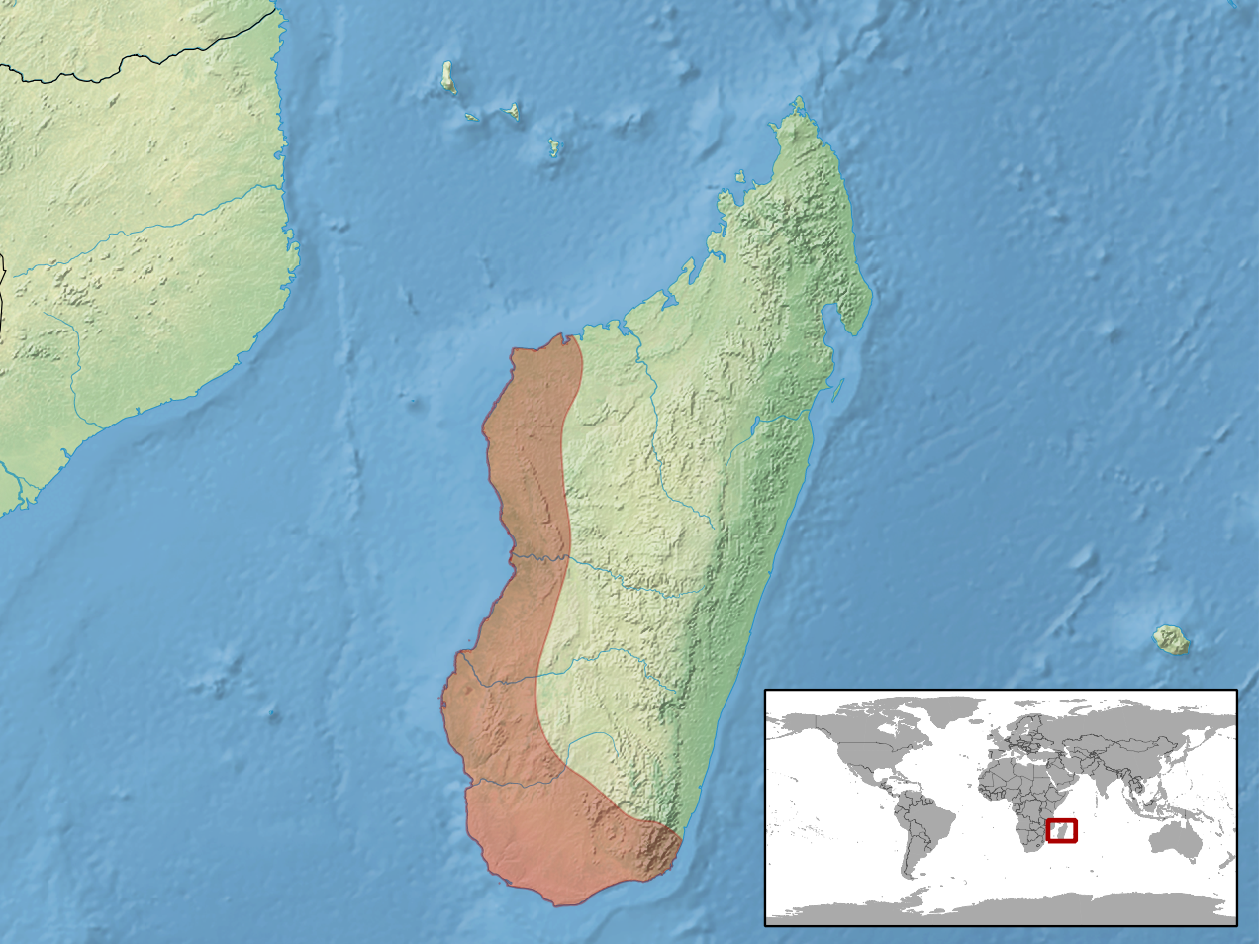

Synonyms
- Geckolepis typicus; Geckolepis anomala; Geckolepis petiti; Geckolepis modesta

Species of lizard

Grandidier's gecko (Geckolepis typica) is a species of lizard in the family Gekkonidae. It is endemic to Madagascar.
