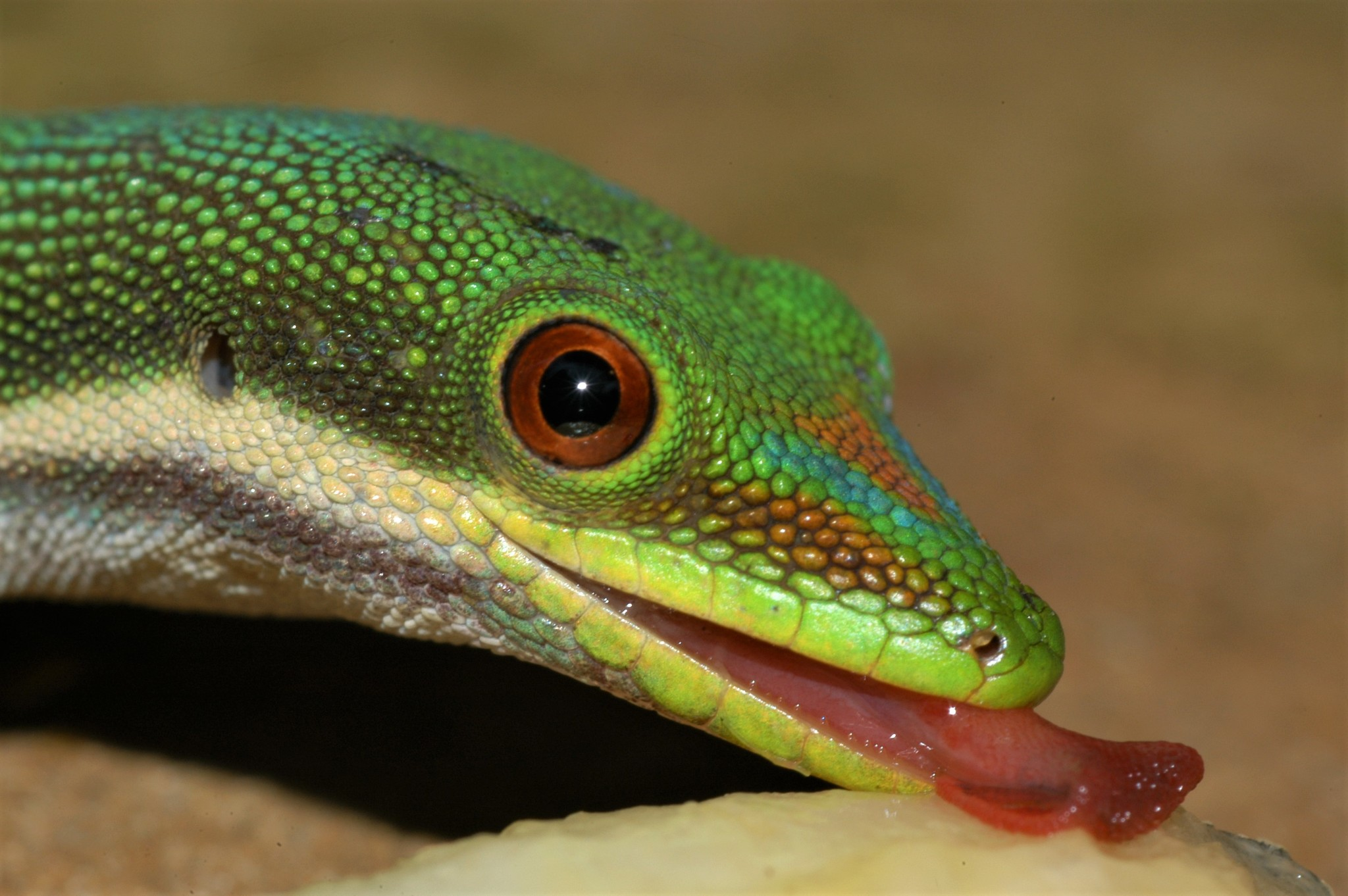

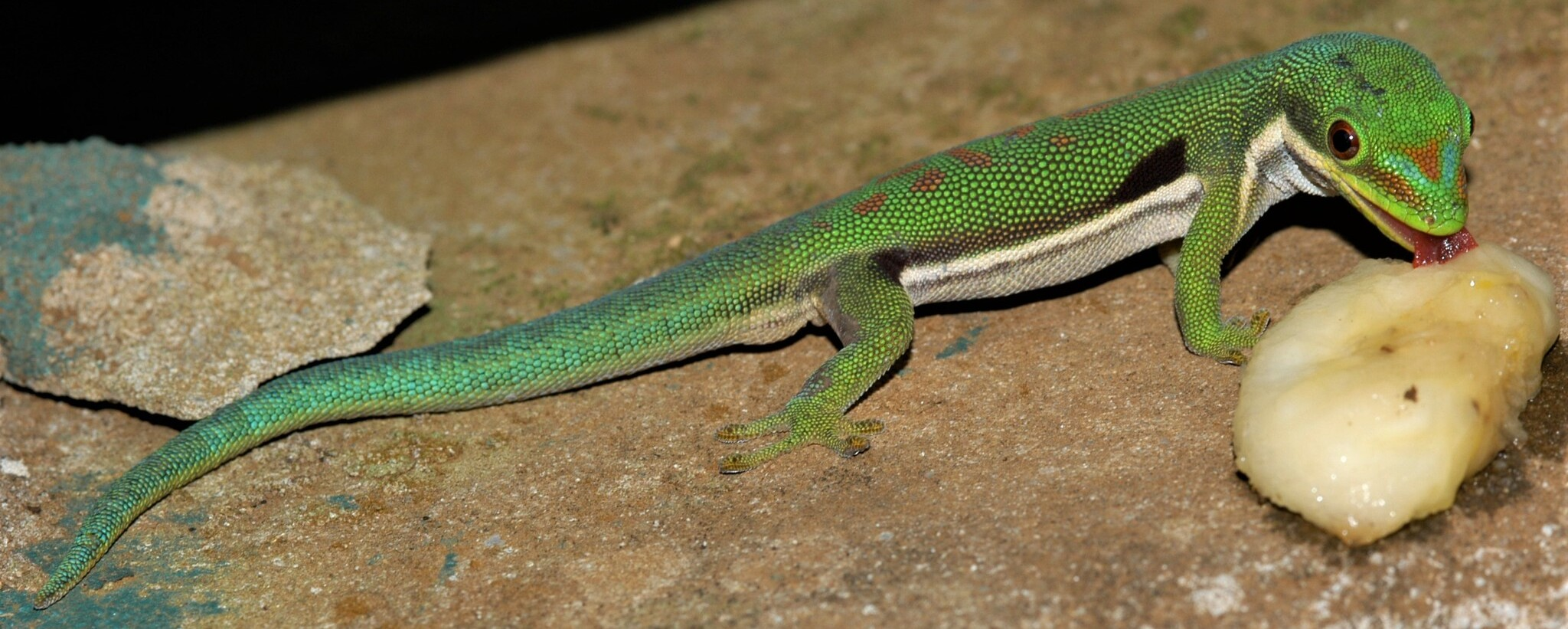

Conservation status
- Near Threatened (IUCN 3.1)

Scientific classification
- Kingdom: Animalia
- Phylum: Chordata
- Class: Reptilia
- Order: Squamata
- Suborder: Gekkota
- Family: Gekkonidae
- Genus: Phelsuma
- Species: P. dorsivittata

Binomial name
- Phelsuma dorsivittata Mertens, 1964
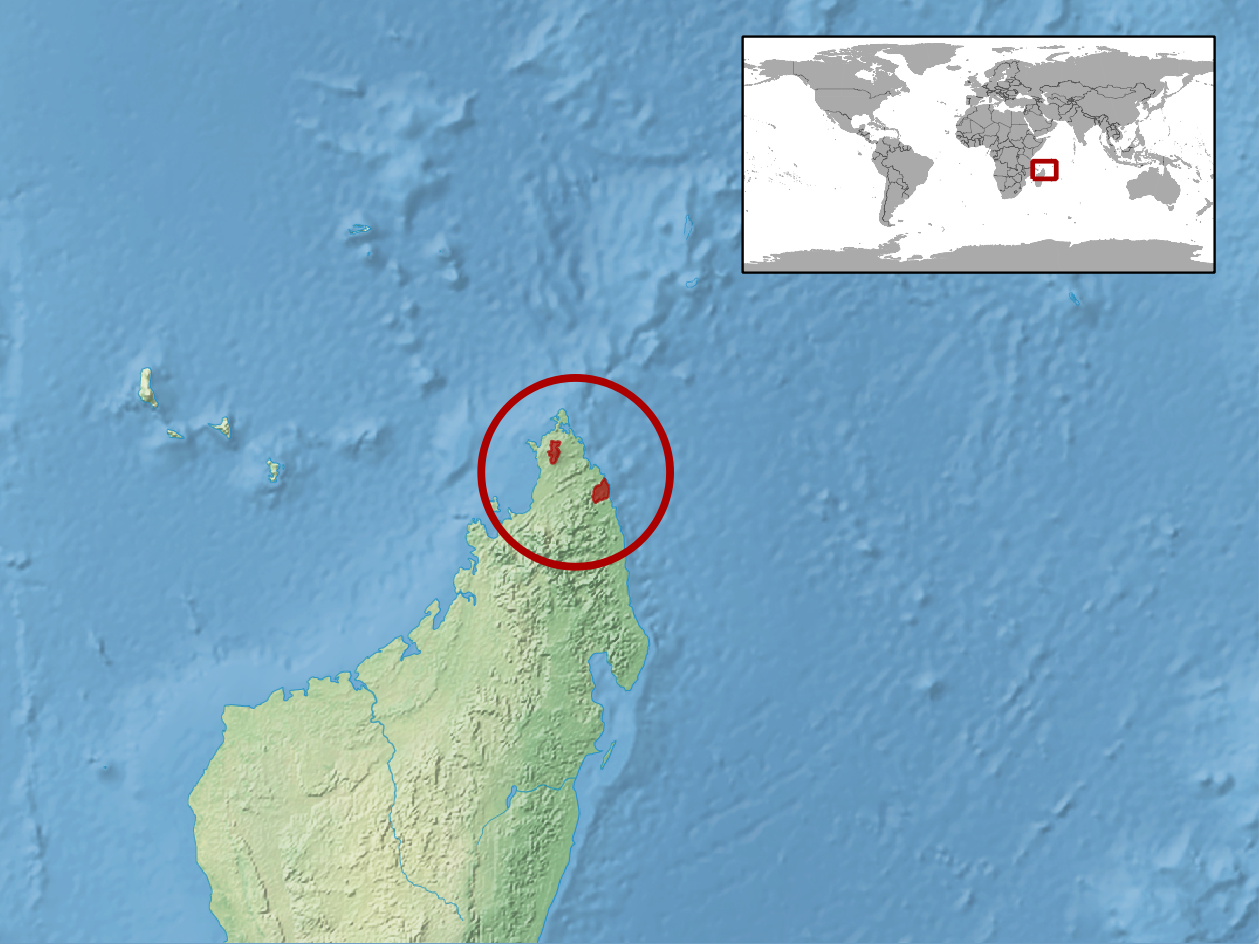

Synonyms
- Phelsuma lineata dorsivittata Mertens, 1964

= Phelsuma dorsivittata =

Species of lizard

Phelsuma dorsivittata is a species of gecko endemic to northern Madagascar.
