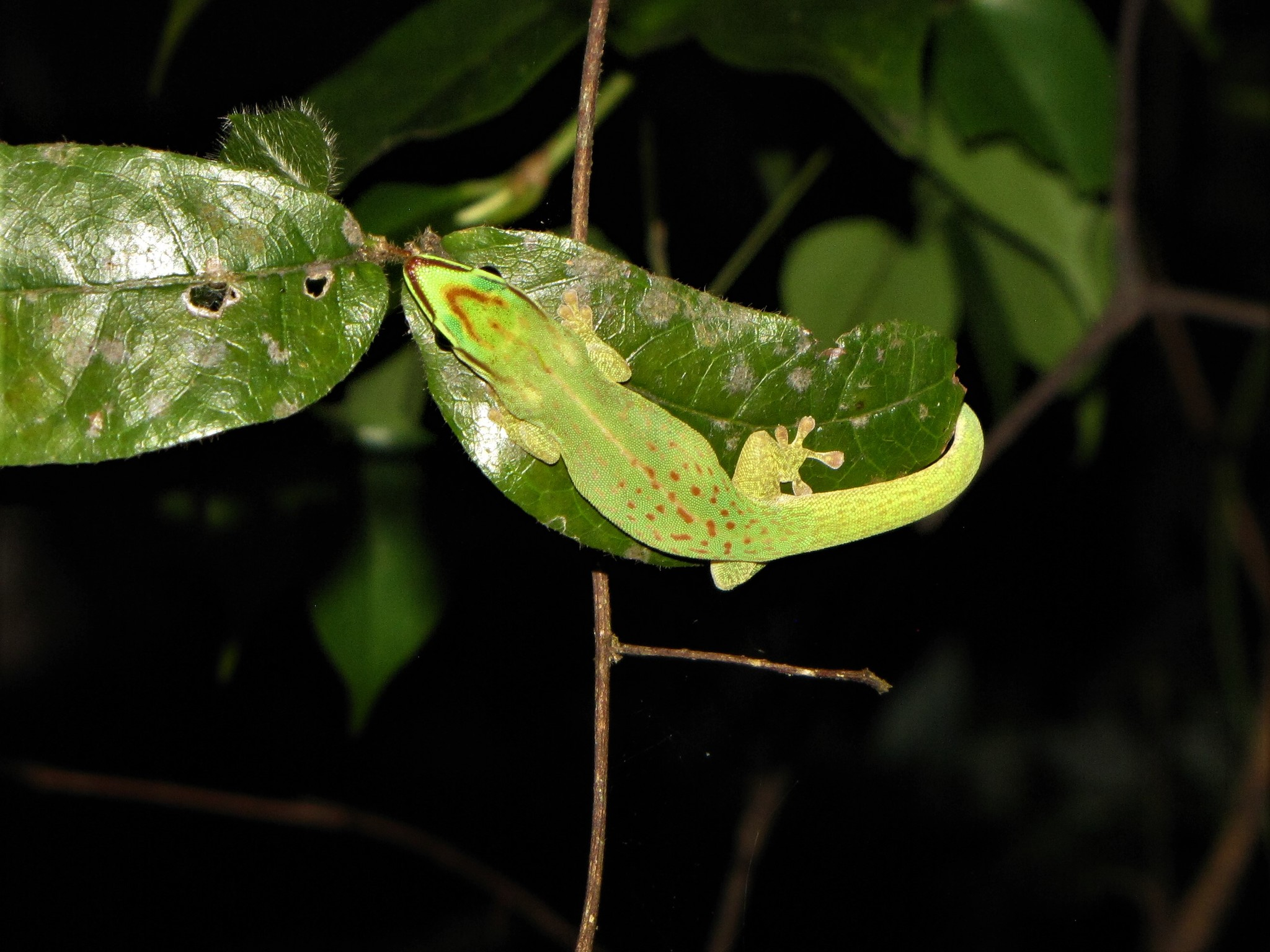

Conservation status
- Endangered (IUCN 3.1)

Scientific classification
- Kingdom: Animalia
- Phylum: Chordata
- Class: Reptilia
- Order: Squamata
- Suborder: Gekkota
- Family: Gekkonidae
- Genus: Phelsuma
- Species: P. seippi

Binomial name
- Phelsuma seippi Meier, 1987
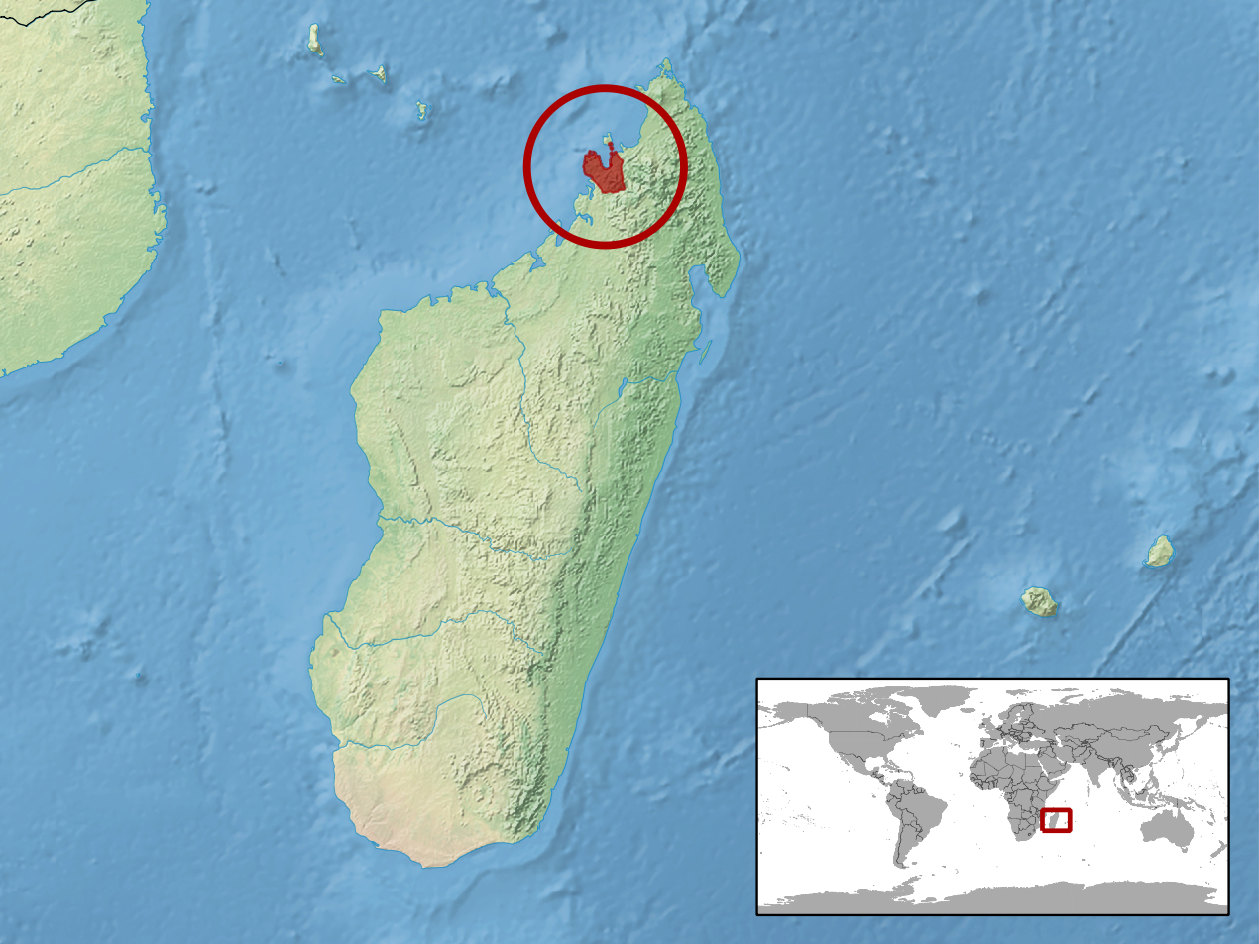

= Seipp's day gecko =

Species of lizard

Seipp's day gecko (Phelsuma seippi) is an endangered diurnal species of lizard in the family Gekkonidae. The species is native to northern Madagascar, typically inhabits rainforests, dwells on trees, and feeds on insects and nectar.

== Etymology ==
The specific name, seippi, is in honor of German herpetologist Robert Seipp.

== Description ==
P. seippi belongs to the medium-sized day geckos. It can reach a total length (including tail) of about 14 cm (5.5 in). The body colour of this slender and long-snouted gecko is green or yellowish green. There are several small red or rust-coloured spots on the back which may form dorsal striping. A rust-coloured eye stripe extends from the nostril to above the ear opening. A red v-shaped marking may be present on the head. Typical for this species are several v-shaped stripes on the throat. The ventral side is light pink.

== Geographic range ==
P. seippi inhabits northwest Madagascar. It can also be found on the islands Nosy Bé and Nosy Komba.

== Habitat ==
The preferred natural habitat of P. seippi is forest, at altitudes from sea level to 400 m (1,300 ft). Seipp's day gecko is restricted to the native rainforests and avoids bright sun light. It lives on trees both in the forest and along its edges. It is largely dependent on bamboo forest, and habitat degradation is a major threat to this species.

== Diet ==
P. seippi feeds on various insects and other invertebrates. It also likes to lick soft, sweet fruit, pollen and nectar.

== Behaviour ==
P. seippi is often found in pairs on a tree. Juveniles mainly inhabit surrounding low shrubs.

== Reproduction ==
The female of P. seippi lays a pair of eggs and hides them on the ground under foliage or wood, or she may lay her eggs on trees under loose bark. At a temperature of 28 °C (82 °F), the young will hatch after approximately 45–50 days. The juveniles measure 40 mm (1.6 in).

== Captivity ==
P. seippi should be housed in pairs in a well planted terrarium. The temperature should be between 25 and 28 °C (77 and 82 °F). The humidity should be maintained between 75 and 100%. In captivity, P. seippi can be fed crickets, wax moth larvae, fruit flies, mealworms, and houseflies.
