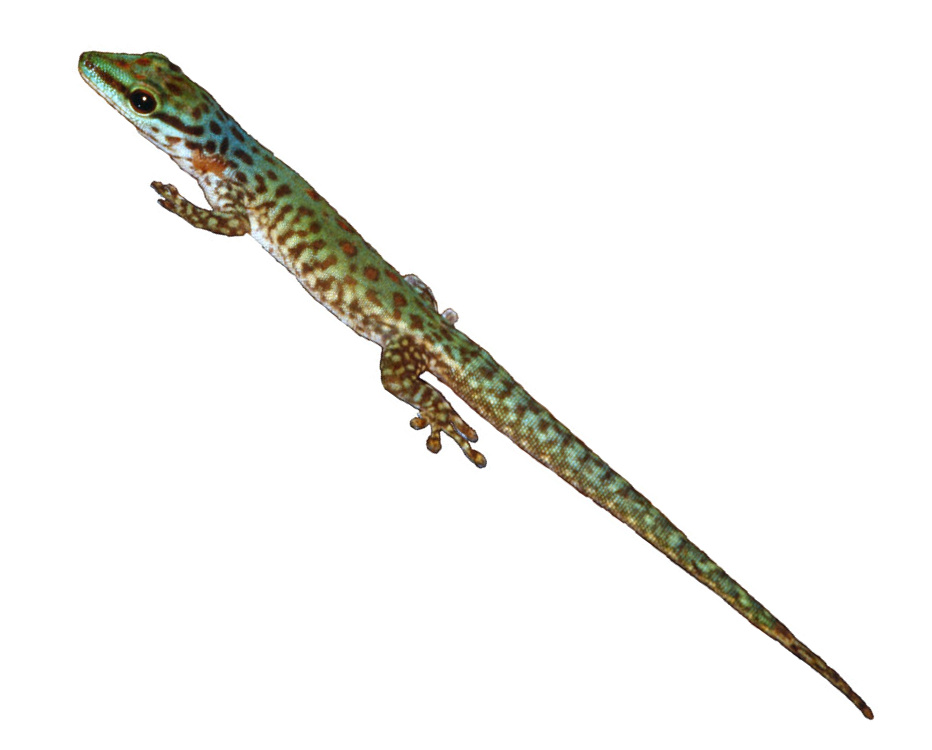

Scientific classification
- Domain: Eukaryota
- Kingdom: Animalia
- Phylum: Chordata
- Class: Reptilia
- Order: Squamata
- Infraorder: Gekkota
- Family: Gekkonidae
- Genus: Phelsuma
- Species: P. guttata

Binomial name
- Phelsuma guttata Kaudern, 1922
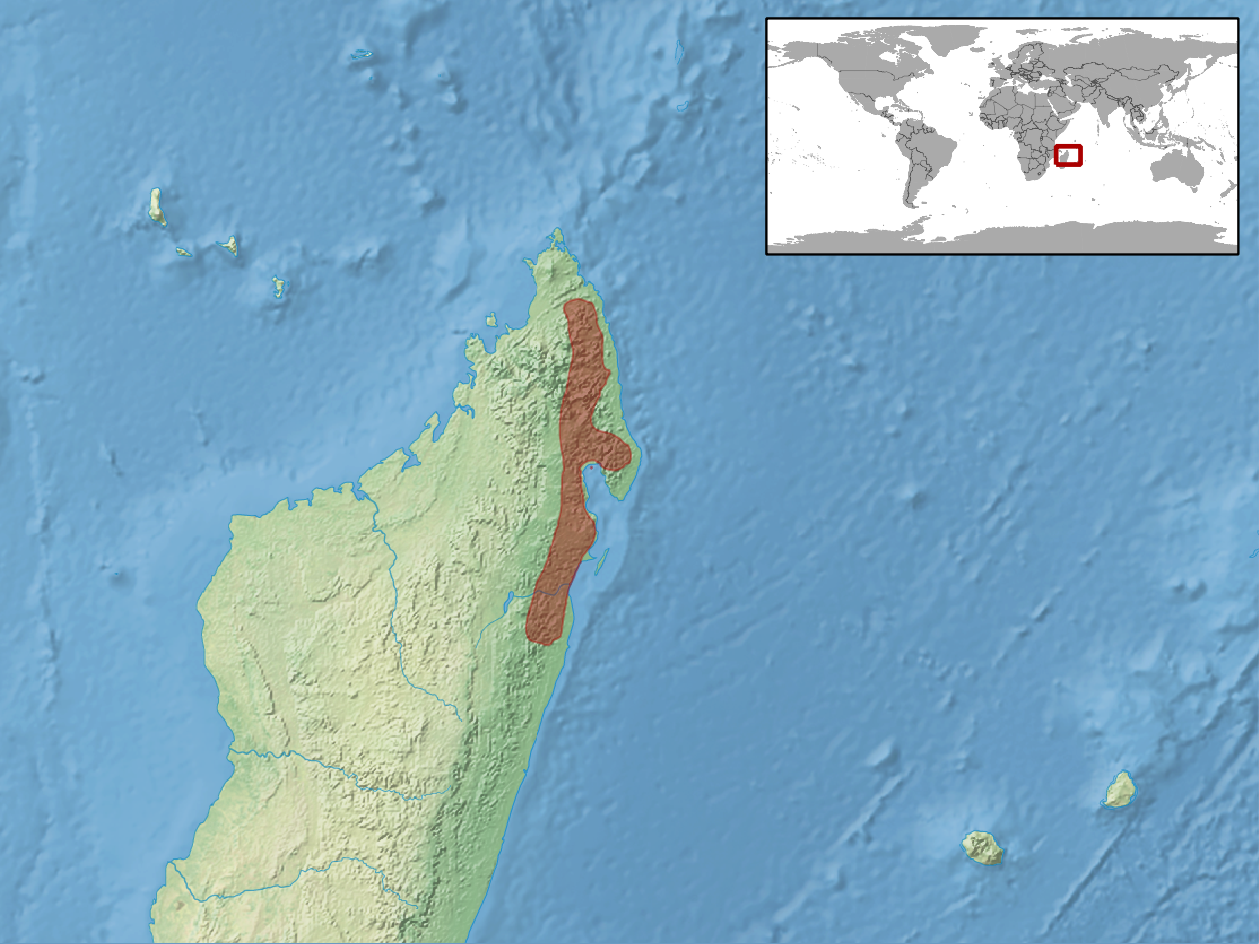

= Speckled day gecko =

Species of lizard

The speckled day gecko (Phelsuma guttata) is a diurnal species of geckos. It lives in eastern Madagascar and typically inhabits rainforests and dwells on trees. The speckled day gecko feeds on insects and nectar.

== Description ==
This lizard belongs to the medium-sized day geckos. It can reach a total length of about 13 cm. The body colour of this slender and long-snouted gecko is dark green. There are several small orange spots on the middle and lower portion of the back. A black eye stripe extends from the nostril to above the ear opening. Typical for this species are several v-shaped stripes on the throat. The flanks, legs and toes are white speckled. Some populations have some blue spots in the neck region. The ventral side is grayish white.

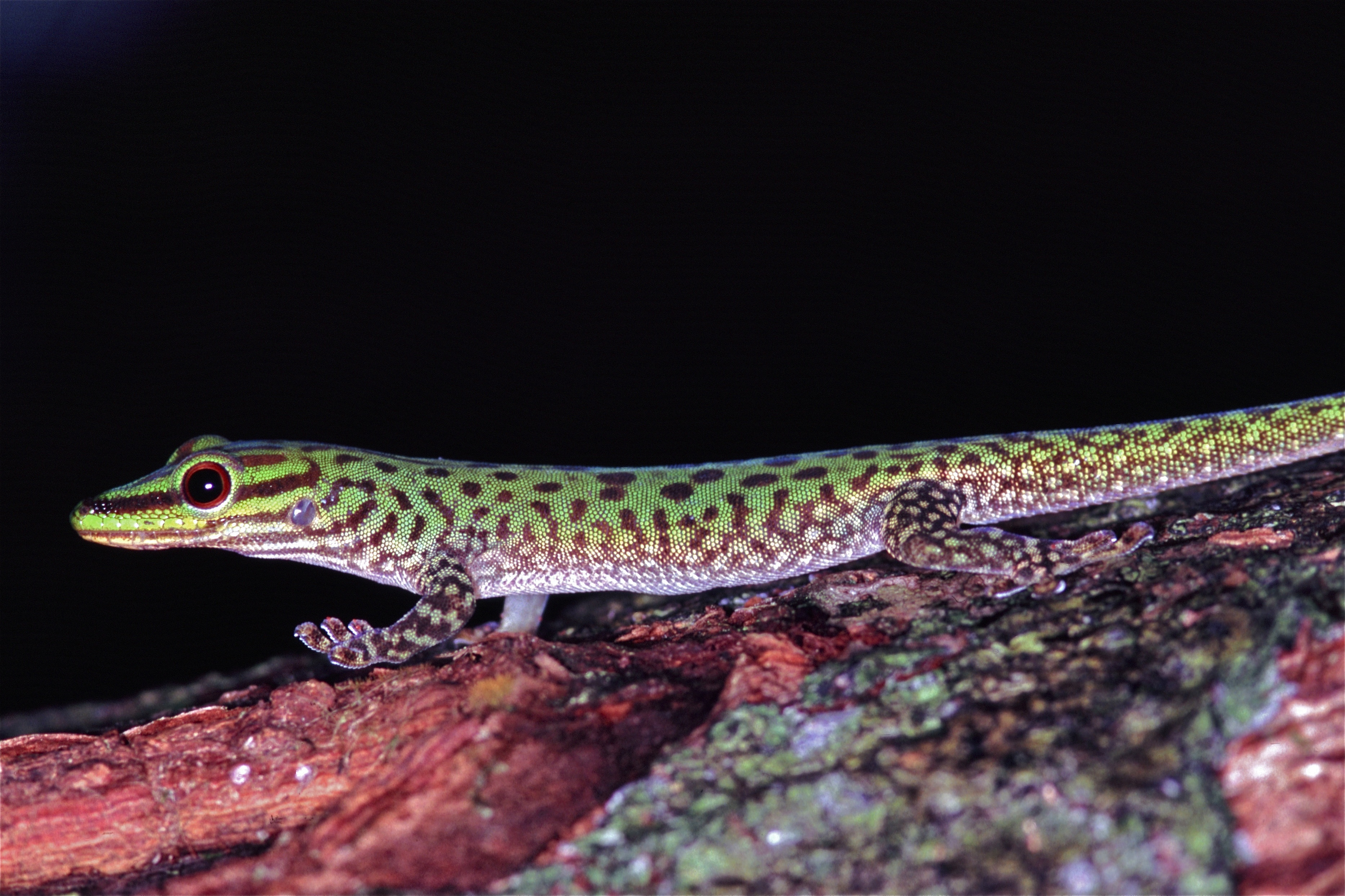

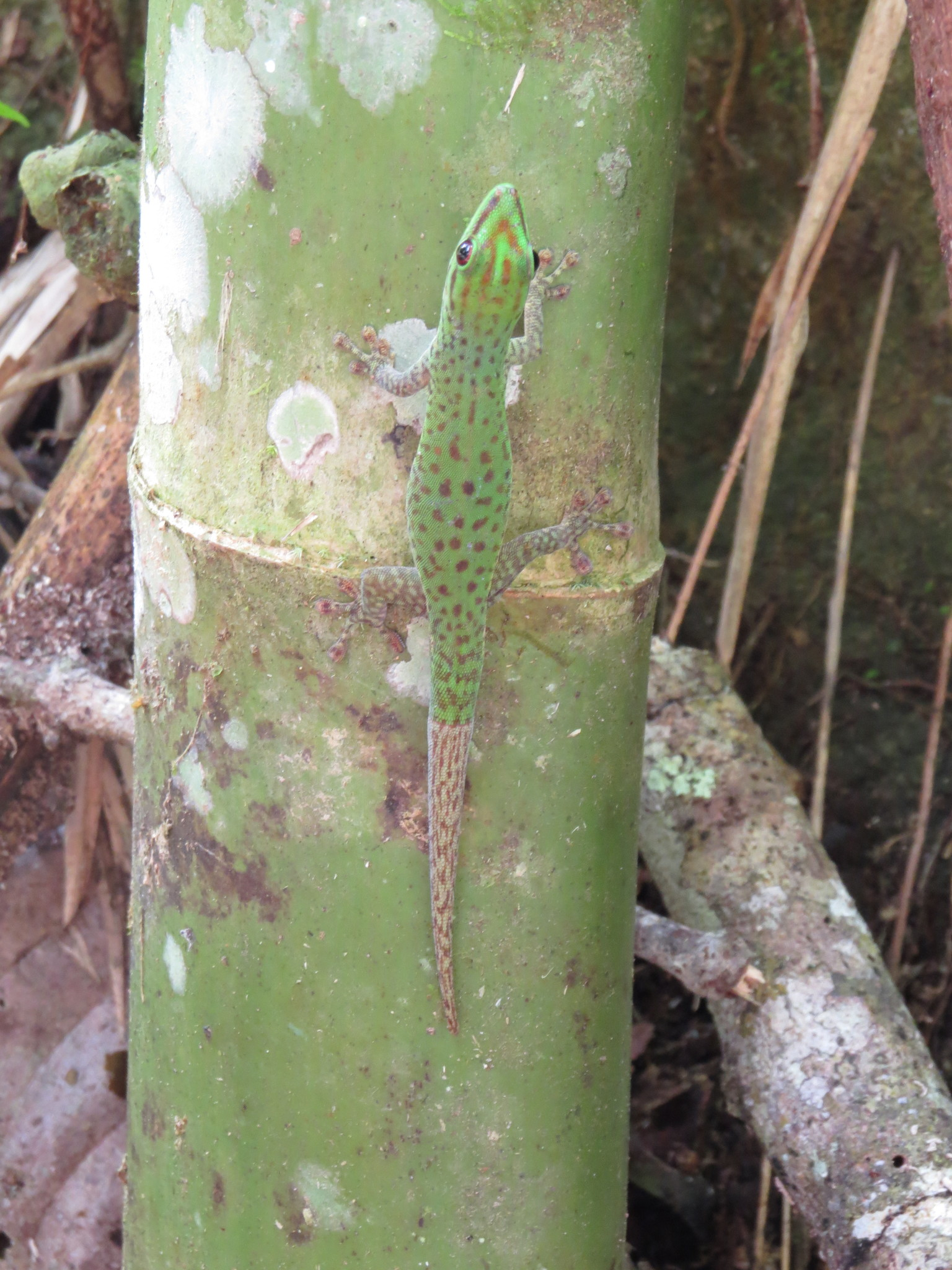

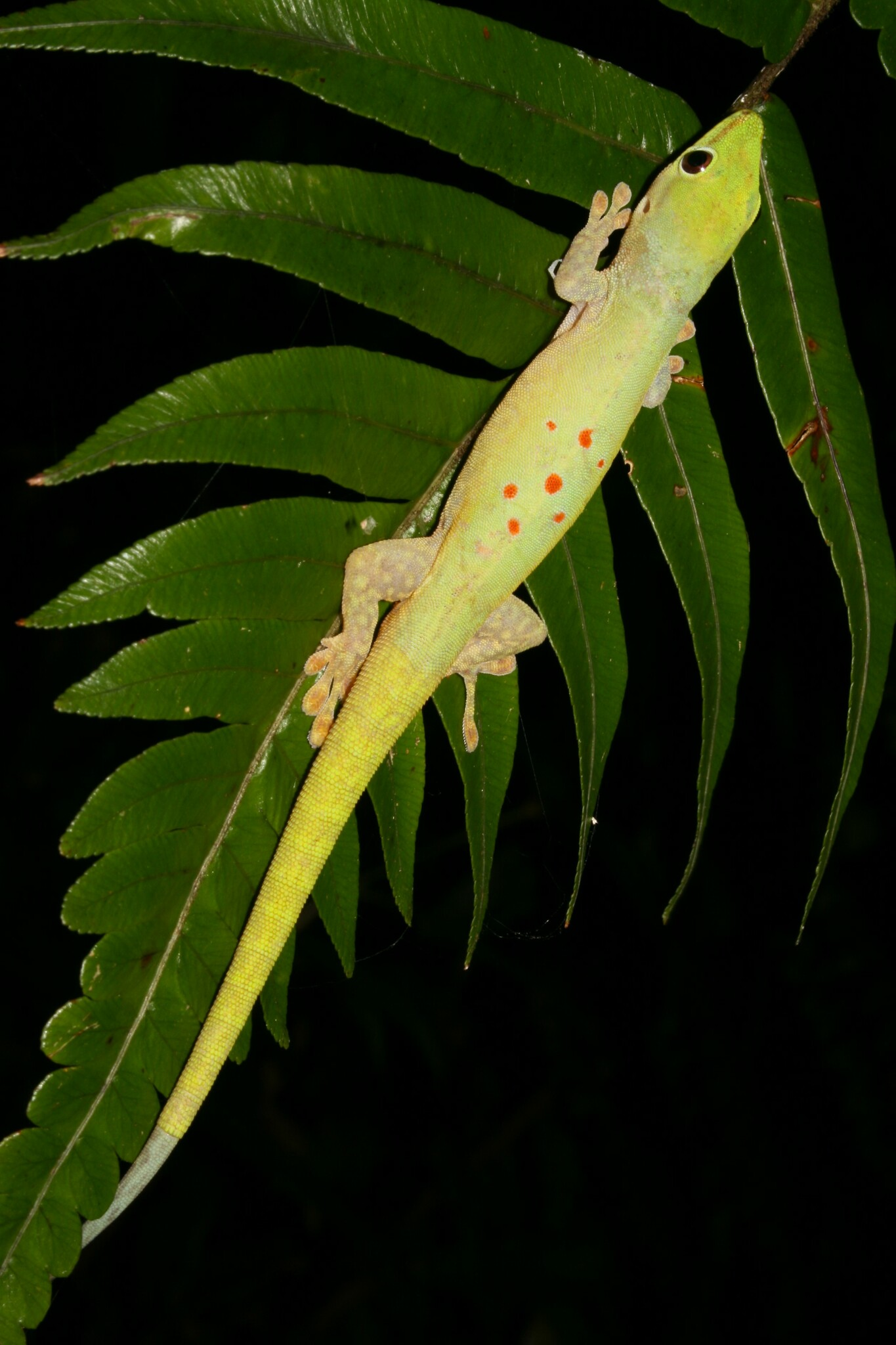

== Distribution ==
This species inhabits north-east Madagascar, along the coast. It can also be found on some nearby islets.

== Habitat ==
P. guttata typically lives in rainforests where they live on trees and avoid bright sun light. Since much of the primary rainforest has been cleared, this species is also found on bushes and introduced banana trees.

== Diet ==
These day geckos feed on various insects and other invertebrates. They also like to lick soft, sweet fruit, pollen and nectar.

== Behaviour ==
This Phelsuma species is often found in pairs on a tree. Juveniles mainly inhabit surrounding low shrubs.

== Reproduction ==
The females lay a pair of eggs and hide them on the ground under foliage or wood or they may lay their eggs on trees under loose bark. At a temperature of 28 °C, the young will hatch after approximately 40–45 days. The juveniles measure 45 mm.

== Care and maintenance in captivity ==
These animals should be housed in pairs in a well planted terrarium. The temperature should be between 25 and 28 °C (77 and 82 °F). The humidity should be maintained between 75. In captivity, these animals can be fed with crickets, wax moths, fruits flies, mealworms and houseflies.
