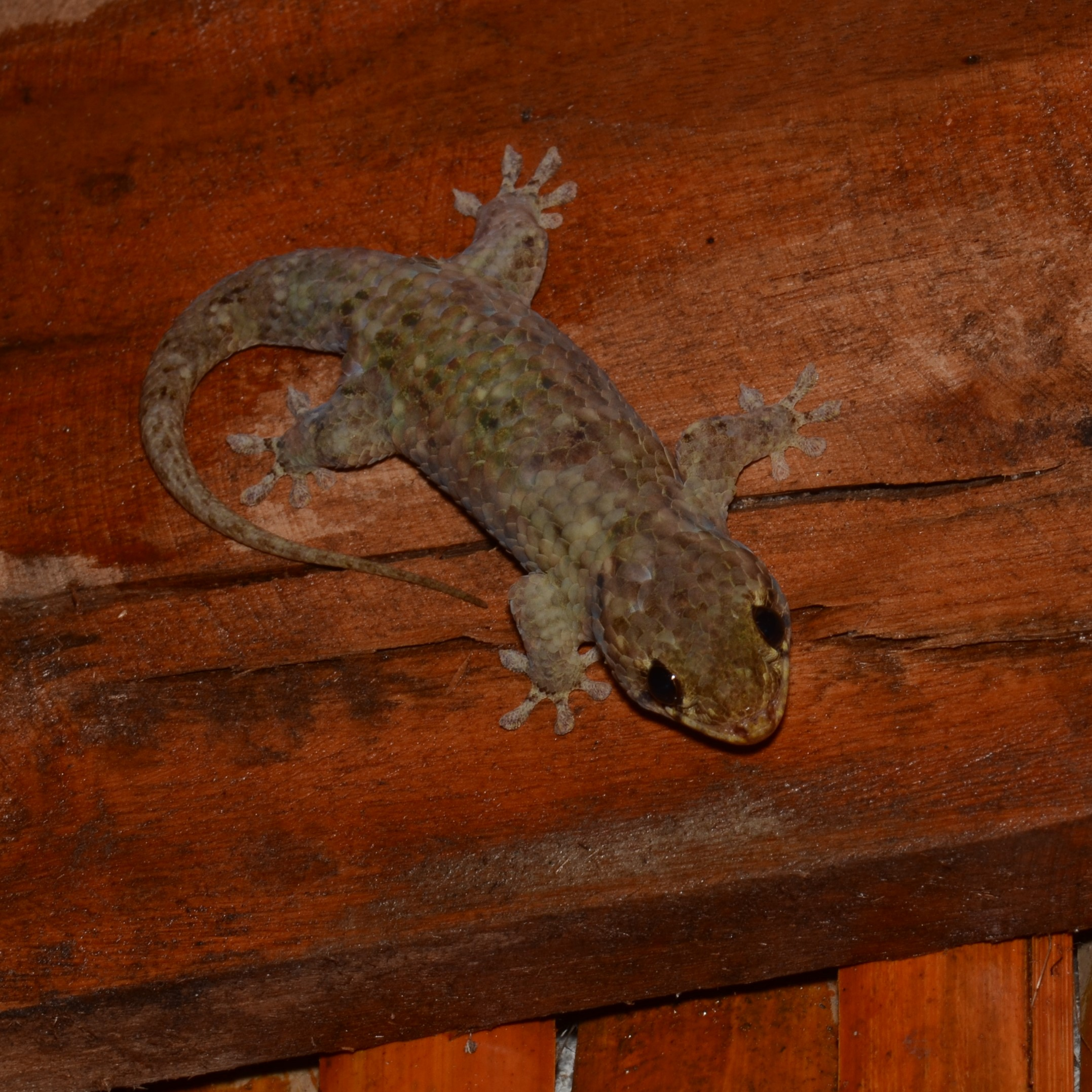

Conservation status
- Least Concern (IUCN 3.1)

Scientific classification
- Kingdom: Animalia
- Phylum: Chordata
- Class: Reptilia
- Order: Squamata
- Suborder: Gekkota
- Family: Gekkonidae
- Genus: Geckolepis
- Species: G. maculata

Binomial name
- Geckolepis maculata Peters, 1880
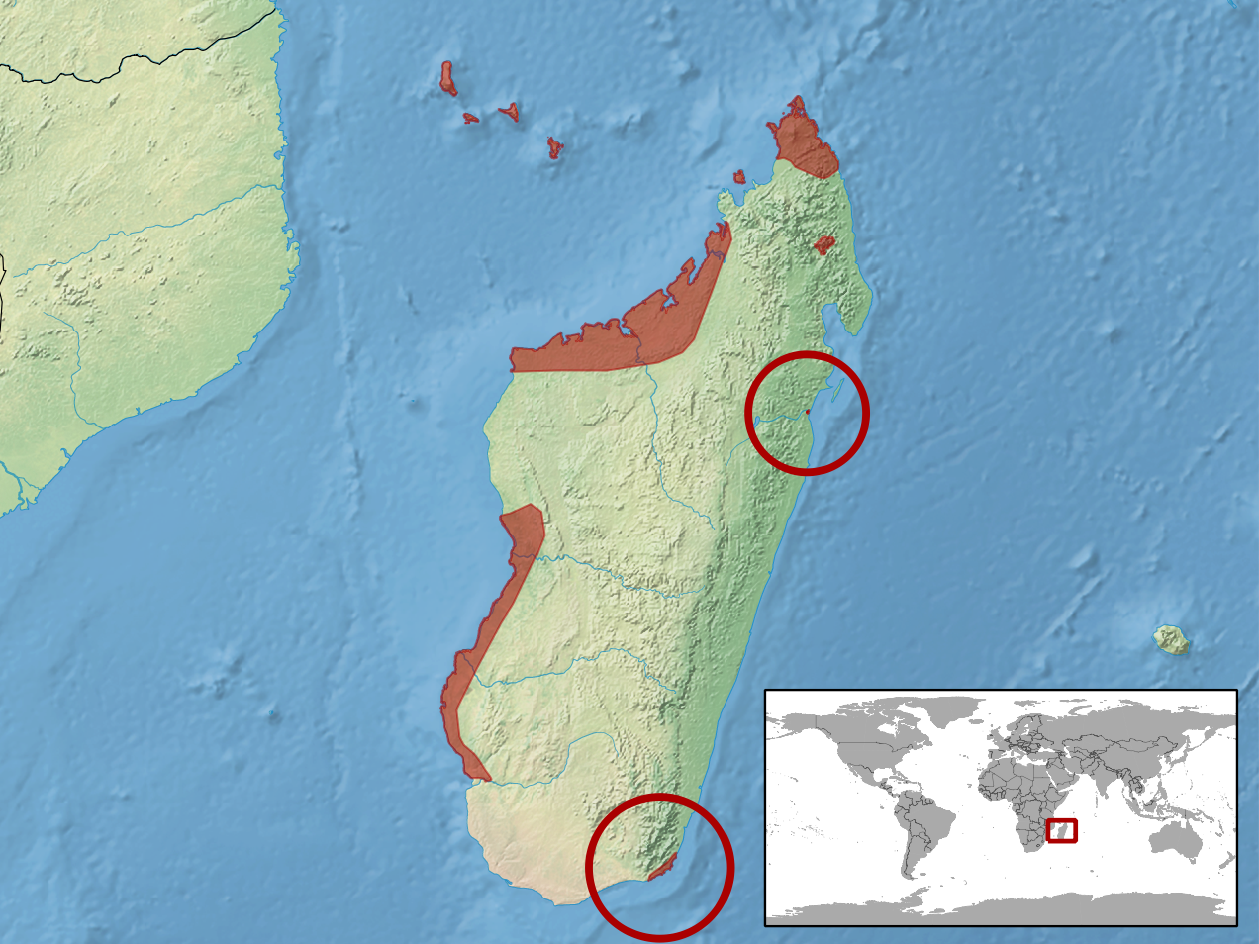

= Geckolepis maculata =

Species of lizard

Geckolepis maculata is a species of gecko that is commonly found in Madagascar. The gecko has large scales, large legs, and is chestnut-cream with black bands. Its common names are Peters's spotted gecko and fish-scale gecko.
