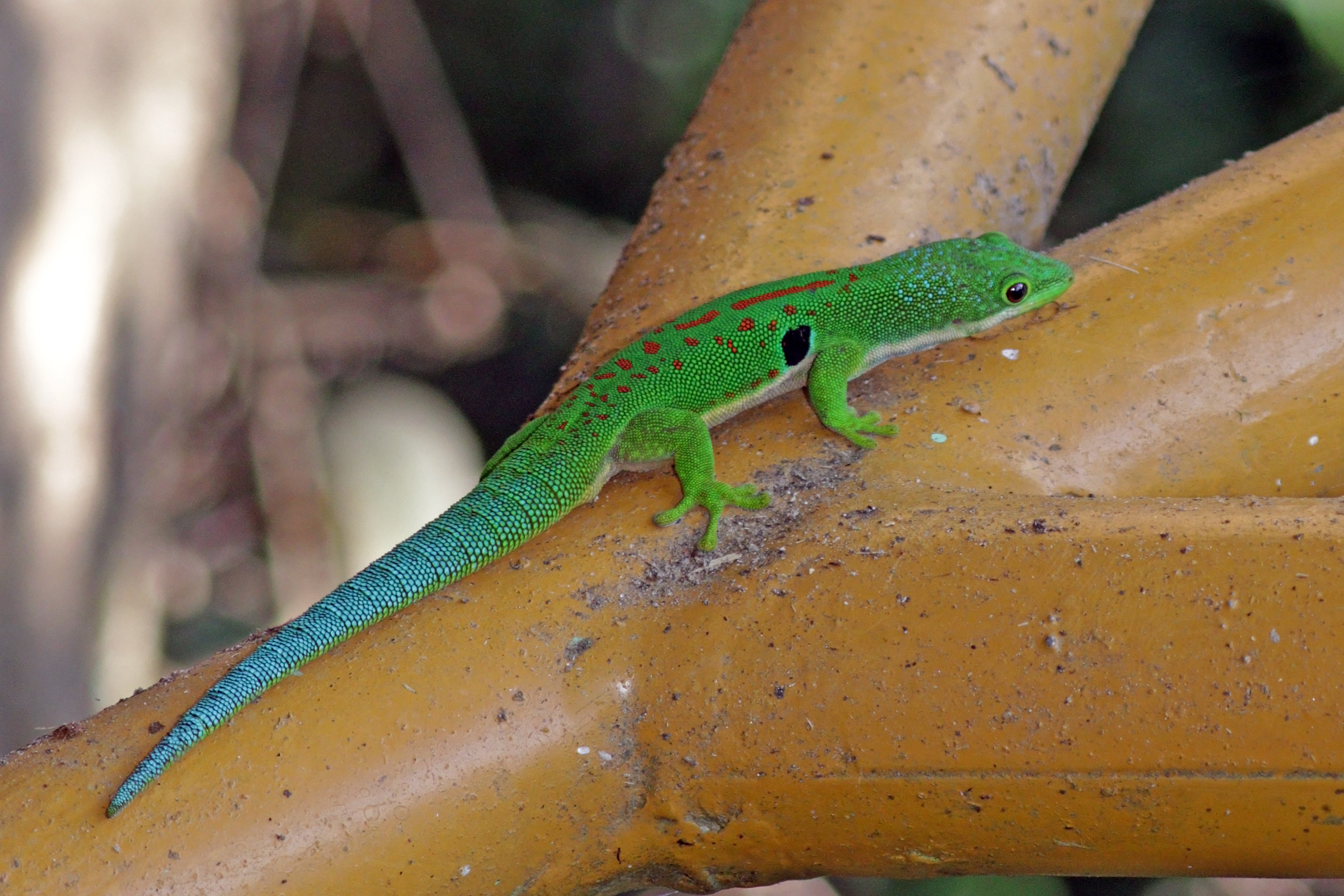
- P. q. quadriocellata Ranomafana National Park

Conservation status
- Least Concern (IUCN 3.1)

Scientific classification
- Kingdom: Animalia
- Phylum: Chordata
- Class: Reptilia
- Order: Squamata
- Suborder: Gekkota
- Family: Gekkonidae
- Genus: Phelsuma
- Species: P. quadriocellata

Binomial name
- Phelsuma quadriocellata Peters, 1883
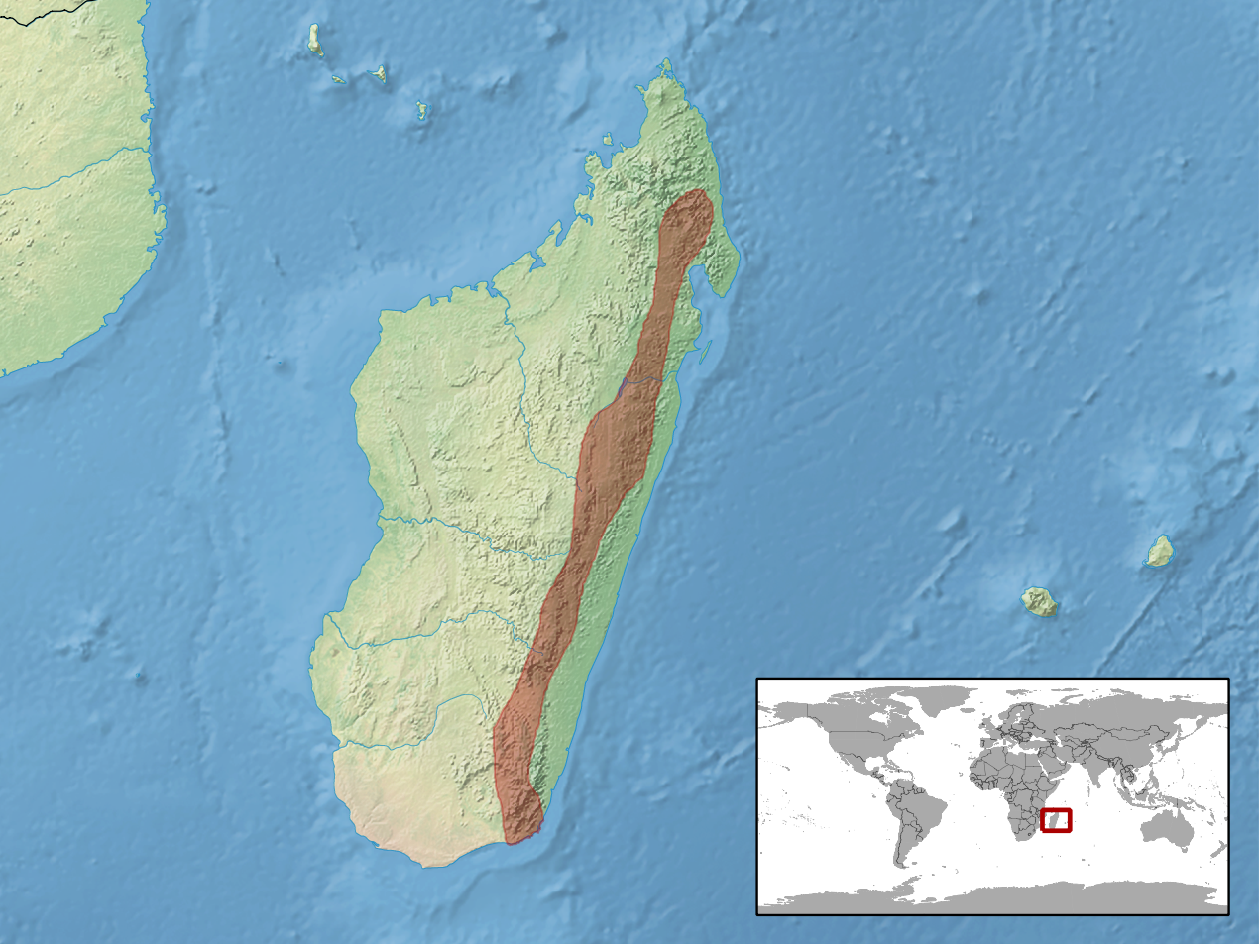

= Phelsuma quadriocellata =

Species of lizard

Phelsuma quadriocellata is a species of gecko known by the common name "Peacock Day Gecko". It is endemic to the coastal regions of eastern Madagascar, where it is an abundant and widespread reptile. This gecko lives in many types of low and mid elevation habitats in Madagascar, including forests. The Peacock Day Gecko has also been known to live in areas with human activity and habitation, including regions being used for land cultivation. It is sometimes associated with Pandanus species.

== Description ==
P. quadriocellata measures 4.7-4.8″ (12 cm) long, including the tail. Like other arboreal geckos, the Peacock Day Gecko has lidless eyes and sticky toe pads. This gecko is bright green, with small red markings and a pale underside. The tail may also be blue in certain individuals. An identifying characteristic of this species is the large dark spots on either side of the abdomen. Some localities of this species also have two such spots, while some others can also have four.

== Species Status and Current Subspecies ==
Phelsuma quadriocellata is currently understood to be a species complex. At present, it is divided into three subspecies:

- P. q. quadriocellata
- P. q. lepida
- P. q. bimaculata

A fourth subspecies was recently elevated to species status and is now named Phelsuma parva.

== Captivity ==
This gecko species is occasionally kept as a pet. Collection, at present, does not constitute a threat to the species.
