= Börner =

Börner or Boerner is a German surname. Notable people with the surname include:

== Börner ==
- Christina Ottiliana Börner, wife of Fritz Cronman (1640–1680)
- Carl Julius Bernhard Börner (1880–1953), German entomologist
- Gustavo Borner, Argentine record producer
- Holger Börner (1931–2006), German politician
- Julian Börner (born 1991), German footballer
- Jacqueline Börner (born 1965), East German speed skater and Olympic medalist
- Katy Börner (born 1967), German engineer, scholar, author, and educator
- Manfred Börner (1929–1996), German physicist and inventor
- Sophie Rogge-Börner (1878–1955), German writer, feminist and nationalist
- Susanne Börner (born 1980), German archaeologist and numismatist

== Boerner ==
- Christian Frederick Boerner (1683–1753), German theologian
- Emil Louis Boerner [see: Boerner-Fry Company/Davis Hotel] (fl.1899), Prussian-born American pharmacist
- Francis Boerner [see: Croft & Boerner] (1889–1936), American architect
- Friedrich Boerner (1723–1761), German physician and professor
- Hermann Boerner (1906–1982), German mathematician
- Larry Boerner (1905–1969), American baseball player
