= Cheke =

Cheke may refer to:

== People ==
- Henry Cheke (c. 1548–1586), English politician
- John Cheke (1514–1557), English classical scholar and statesman; husband of Mary Cheke
- Mary Cheke (c. 1532-1616), English lady of the privy chamber, courtier poet, epigrammatist; wife of John Cheke

== Fauna ==
- Cheke's day gecko, subspecies of day gecko, a lizard in the family Gekkonidae
- Cheke's wood rail, extinct species of rail which was endemic to the Mascarene island of Mauritius

== Other ==
- Cheke Holo language, Oceanic language spoken in the Solomon Islands
