= Assumption Island Airport =

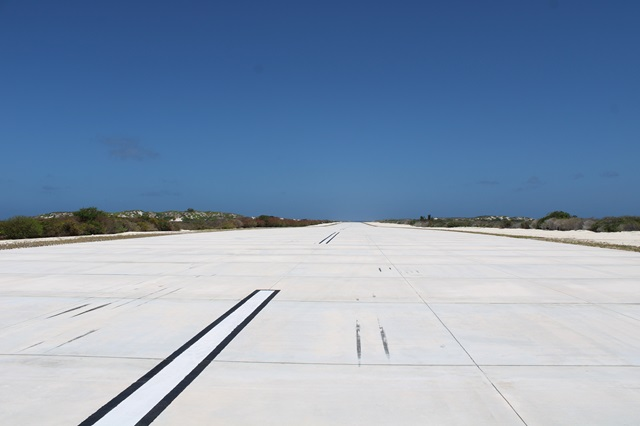
- IATA: none; ICAO: FSAS

Summary
- Airport type: Private
- Operator: Islands Development Corporation (IDC)
- Location: Assumption Island, Seychelles
- Elevation AMSL: 10 ft (3.0 m)
- Coordinates: 09°44′32″S 46°30′24″E

Map
- Location of airport in Seychelles

Runways
Direction	Length		Surface
Direction	m	ft	Surface
16/34	1,206	3,957	Concrete
- Source: GCM WAD Google Maps

Assumption Island Airport (ICAO: FSAS) is an airport serving Assumption Island in the Seychelles. The island is 30 kilometres (19 mi) southeast of the Aldabra Atoll and is part of the Aldabra Group.

== See also ==
- Transport in Seychelles
- List of airports in Seychelles
