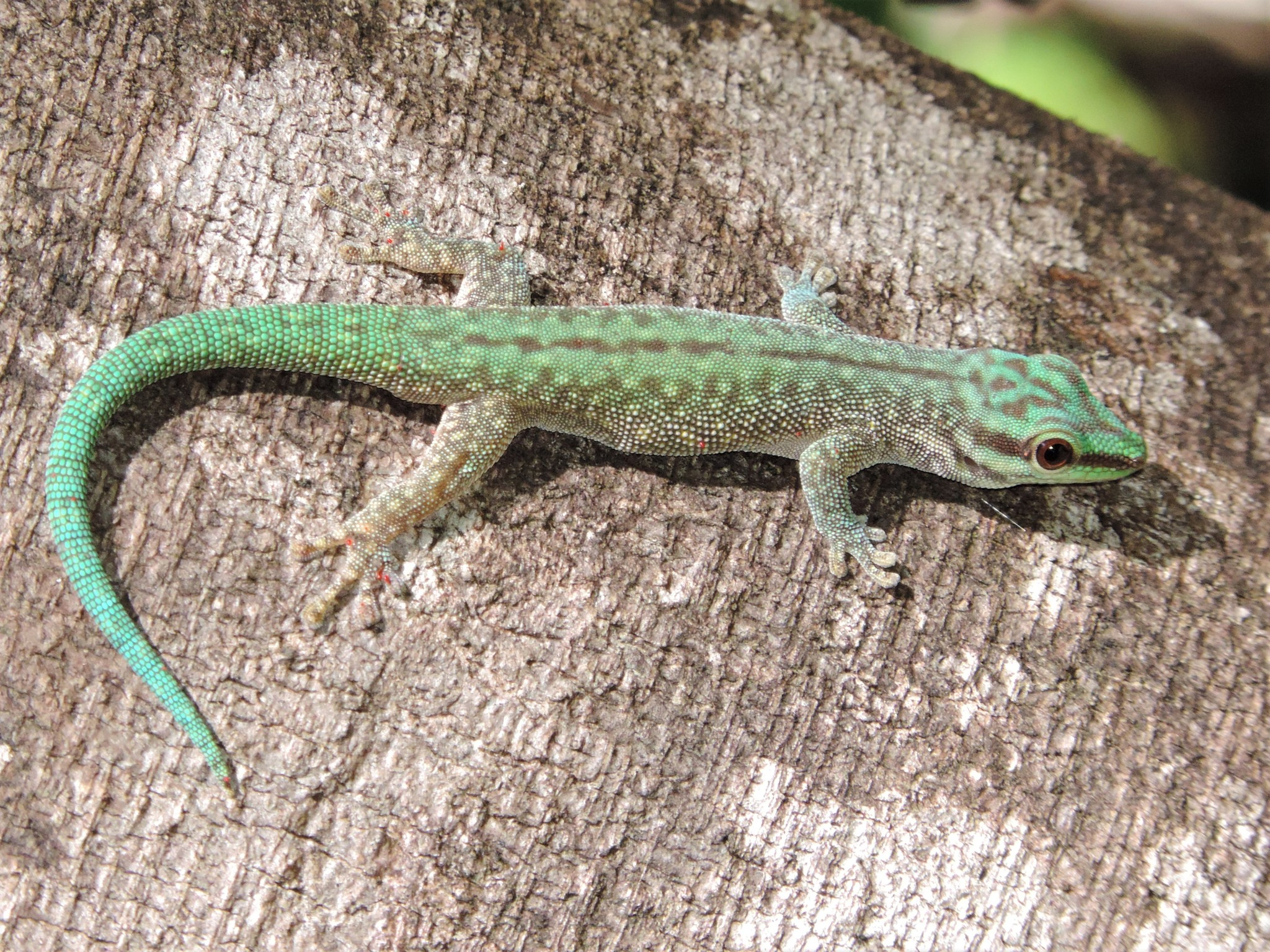

Conservation status
- Least Concern (IUCN 3.1)

Scientific classification
- Kingdom: Animalia
- Phylum: Chordata
- Class: Reptilia
- Order: Squamata
- Suborder: Gekkota
- Family: Gekkonidae
- Genus: Phelsuma
- Species: P. abbotti

Binomial name
- Phelsuma abbotti Stejneger, 1893
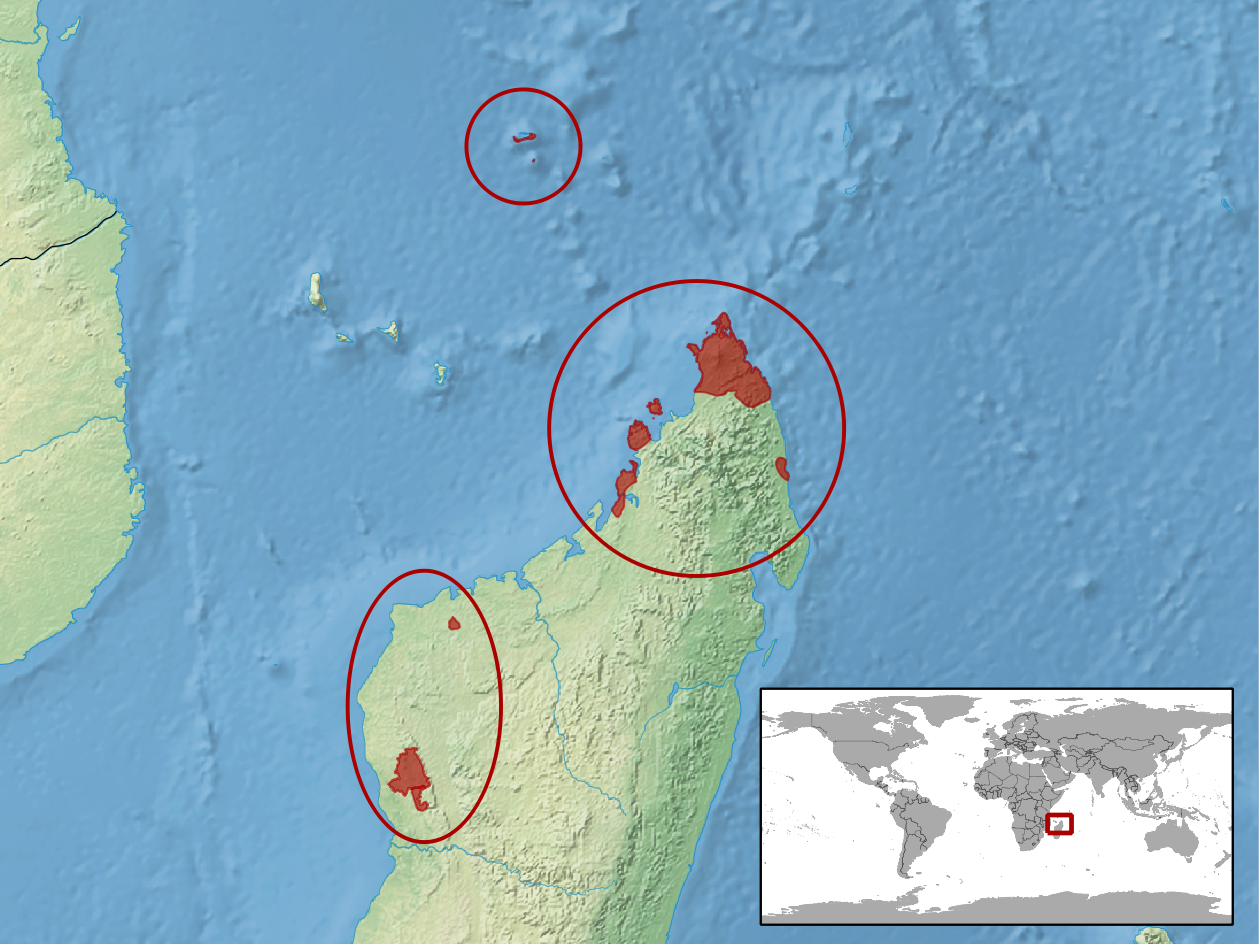

= Phelsuma abbotti =

Species of lizard

Phelsuma abbotti, commonly known as Abbott's day gecko, the Aldabra day gecko, and the Assumption day gecko, is a species of lizard in the family Gekkonidae.

== Geographic range ==
P. abbotti is found in Madagascar and Seychelles.

== Subspecies ==
Three subspecies are distinguished:

- Phelsuma abbotti abbotti Stejneger, 1893 – Aldabra Island day gecko (Aldabra Atoll, the Seychelles)
- Phelsuma abbotti chekei Börner & Minuth, 1984 – Cheke's day gecko (Madagascar)
- Phelsuma abbotti sumptio Cheke, 1982 – Assumption Island day gecko (Assumption Island, the Seychelles)

== Habitat ==
The natural habitats of P. abbotti are subtropical or tropical dry forests, subtropical or tropical moist lowland forests, subtropical or tropical mangrove forests, subtropical or tropical dry shrubland, rural gardens, urban areas, and introduced vegetation.

== Reproduction ==
P. abbotti is oviparous.

== Etymology ==
P. abbotti is named after American naturalist William Louis Abbott.
