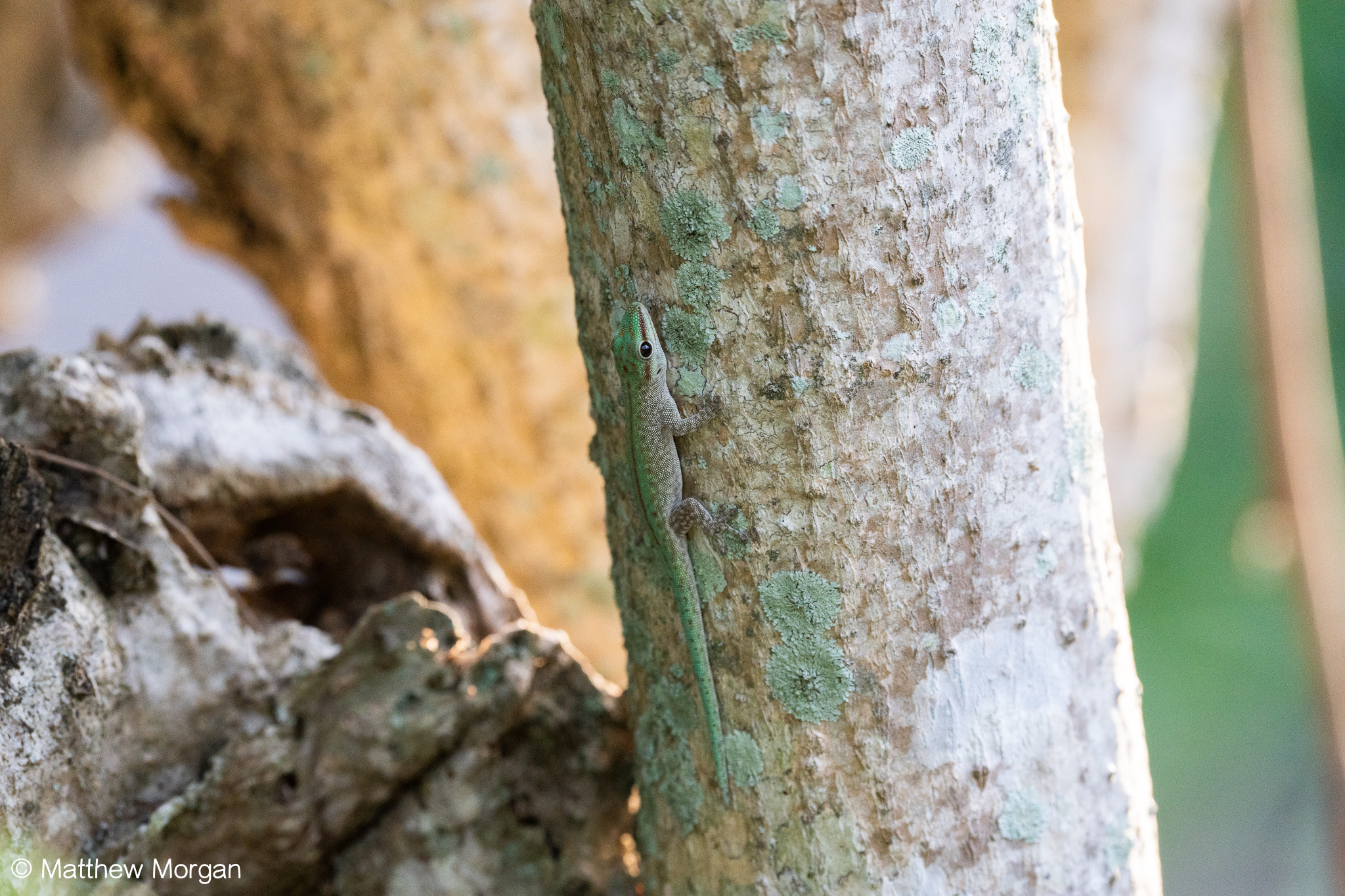

Scientific classification
- Kingdom: Animalia
- Phylum: Chordata
- Class: Reptilia
- Order: Squamata
- Suborder: Gekkota
- Family: Gekkonidae
- Genus: Phelsuma
- Species: P. abbotti
- Subspecies: P. a. abbotti

Trinomial name
- Phelsuma abbotti abbotti Stejneger, 1893

= Aldabra Island day gecko =

Subspecies of lizard

The Aldabra Island day gecko, or Aldabra day gecko (Phelsuma abbotti abbotti), has been found on the Aldabra Atoll (Seychelles). It lives on low trees and bushes and eats insects and fruit.
