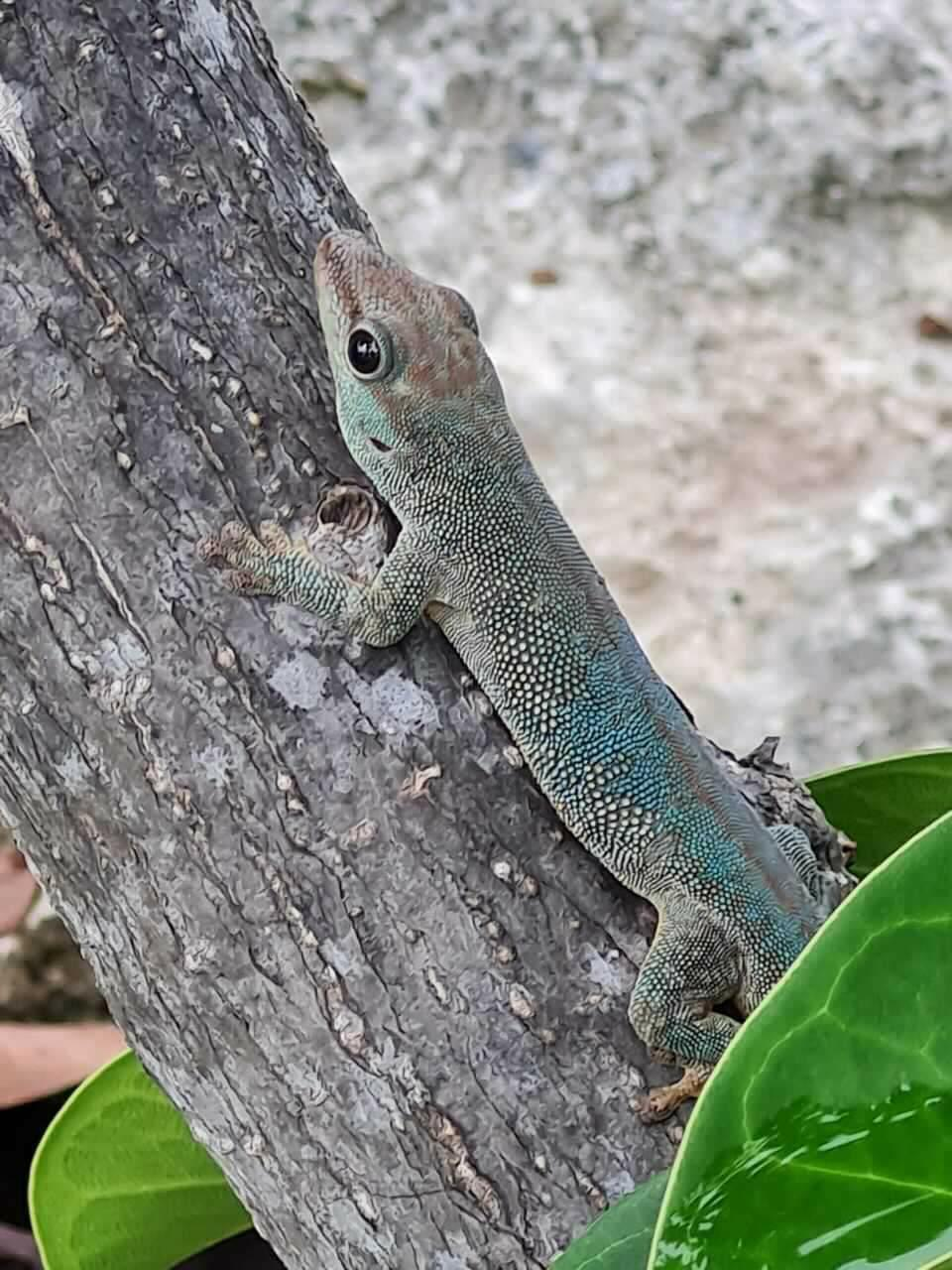

Scientific classification
- Kingdom: Animalia
- Phylum: Chordata
- Class: Reptilia
- Order: Squamata
- Suborder: Gekkota
- Family: Gekkonidae
- Genus: Phelsuma
- Species: P. abbotti
- Subspecies: P. a. sumptio

Trinomial name
- Phelsuma abbotti sumptio Cheke, 1982

= Assumption Island day gecko =

Subspecies of lizard

Assumption Island day Gecko (Phelsuma abbotti sumptio Cheke, 1982) is a subspecies of gecko. It is named for, and only found on, Assumption Island, a small outlying island to the south west of the Seychelles. This gecko It typically reaches the length of 140 mm, lives on palm trees and feeds on insects and fruit.
