= Assumption Island =

Island in the Outer Islands of Seychelles

Nickname: Île de l'Assomption
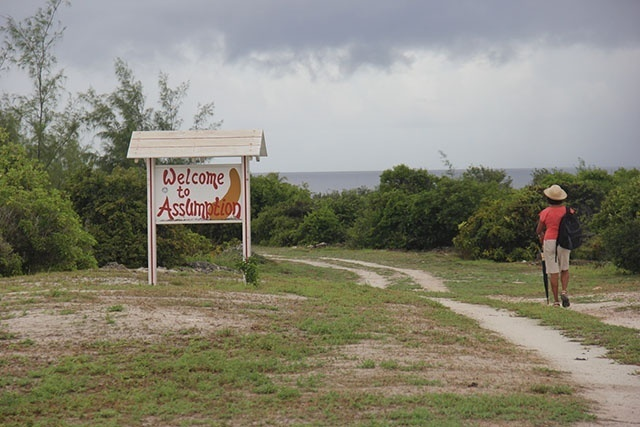
- Assumption Island

- Location within Seychelles

Geography
- Location: Indian Ocean
- Coordinates: 09°45′S 46°29′E
- Archipelago: Seychelles
- Adjacent to: Indian Ocean
- Total islands: 1
- Major islands: Assumption
- Area: 11.60 km^{2} (4.48 sq mi)
- Length: 6.7 km (4.16 mi)
- Width: 2.9 km (1.8 mi)
- Coastline: 17.23 km (10.706 mi)
- Highest elevation: 32 m (105 ft)
- Highest point: southeast hill

Administration
- Seychelles (leased by India)
- Group: Outer Islands
- Sub-Group: Aldabra Group
- Districts: Outer Islands District
- Largest settlement: Assumption (pop. 20)

Demographics
- Population: 20 (2016)
- Pop. density: 1.7/km^{2} (4.4/sq mi)
- Ethnic groups: Creole, French, East Africans, Indians.

Additional information
- Time zone: SCT (UTC+4)
- ISO code: SC-26
- Official website: www.seychelles.travel/en/discover/the-islands/outer-islands

Assumption Island is a small island in the Outer Islands of Seychelles north of Madagascar, 1,135 km (705 mi) southwest of the capital, Victoria.

In 2018, Seychelles and India signed an agreement to build and operate a joint military facility on a portion of the island. The Seychelles National Assembly refuted the agreement after protests by the citizens. As protests continued, the Seychellois president endorsed the Assumption Island deal with India. The plan caused public protests by activists who believed that the islands should stay out of the brewing India-China regional conflict. The agreement was declared "dead" by the islands’ opposition party.

== History ==
Assumption Island was discovered by Captain Nicolas Morphey on 14 August 1756, and was named after the religious feast of the next day. In 1908, the island was leased to Mr H. Savy of Mahé, who built a coconut plantation there. The first settlement was in the northern part of the island. During a visit two years later, he realized the guano potential of the island. The villagers transferred their labor force to a guano mining camp that operated from 1907 until 1983. The camp was the location of the current village. Later, the villagers were employed as fishermen, usually of bêche-de-mer, until it was declared protected.

In the mid-1960s, the island was proposed as an American military base, including a deep-sea port. After strong protests from environmental organizations, the plan was rejected. In 1990, the airfield was built.

In 2024, Assumption Island was leased for 90 years to a Qatari investment group for $50 million.

== Geography ==
Assumption Island is located about 27 km south of Anse Takamaka on Aldabra Atoll and is part of the Aldabra Group. It is a single coral island 11.6 km^{2} (4.5 sq mi) in area. The western shore features an almost uninterrupted sandy beach 5.5 km. Two large sand dunes are prominent on the southeastern coast of the island, one of them 32 metres (105 ft) high. The 5.5 km, white, sandy beach that stretches on the southeastern side of the island has been several times named 'the best beach in the world' for its white sand, crystalline waters, diversity of marine life and lack of crowds. Due to the disruptive effect of guano mining, which lasted until 1983, the island is dominated by expanses of bare rock and caves, and is sparsely covered with low-growing vegetation.

== Administration ==
The island belongs to the Outer Islands District.

== Transport ==
The island is bisected by a 1,210 metres (3,970 ft) concrete airfield (ICAO: FSAS) running between the two dunes on the southeast point to the village on the western coast. The island is occasionally served by an Island Development Company (IDC) aircraft from Mahé, usually with scientists which have a boat take them to Aldabra Atoll. The island has a small port called St. Thomas Anchorage, which is currently enlarged by the Indian Army to a large port.

== Joint Military Facility ==
Assumption Island Airport
- IATA: none; ICAO: FSAS

Summary
- Airport type: Private
- Owner: Seychelles
- Operator: Islands Development Corporation (IDC)
- Location: Assumption Island, Seychelles, Africa
- Built: 1989–1990; Major extensions 2015–2016
- In use: 1990–present
- Elevation AMSL: 3 m (9.8 ft)
- Coordinates: 9°44′32″S 46°30′24″E

Map
- Location of Assumption Island Assumption Island Airstrip (Indian Ocean)

Runways
Direction	Length		Surface
Direction	ft	m	Surface
13/31		1,210	Concrete

In 2015, Seychelles and India signed an agreement for constructing and operating joint military facility on the Island. A coast surveillance radar system built by support from India became operational in 2016. A revised agreement was signed in 2018 and the Seychelles President has endorsed its ratification. The Government of India has also stated that this was a joint project on the request of the Seychelles government and would be jointly managed by both countries. India plans to invest $550 million in building the facility. Recently, the deal for an Indian military base in Seychelles was declared as ‘dead’ by the Island's opposition party. The leader of the opposition also clearly stated that this was the end of the ‘assumption agreement’ and no further discussions on India's military base were on the agenda.

== Flora and fauna ==
Assumption Island was once home to a great diversity of seabirds, including the Abbott's booby, which is now confined to a single breeding island: Christmas Island, in the eastern Indian Ocean. Seychelles Islands Foundation, in conjunction with Island Conservation Society and the Islands Development Company, has eradicated two introduced bird species, Madagascar fody and red-whiskered bulbul. A notable feature of this island is the Assumption Island day gecko, a subspecies of gecko found only on this island. An endemic race of souimanga sunbird breeds on the island. The nature documentary of Jacques-Yves Cousteau and Louis Malle, The Silent World was partially shot on Assumption. The island is known for its rich fish life.

== Image gallery ==
Map 1

District map of the Outer Islands

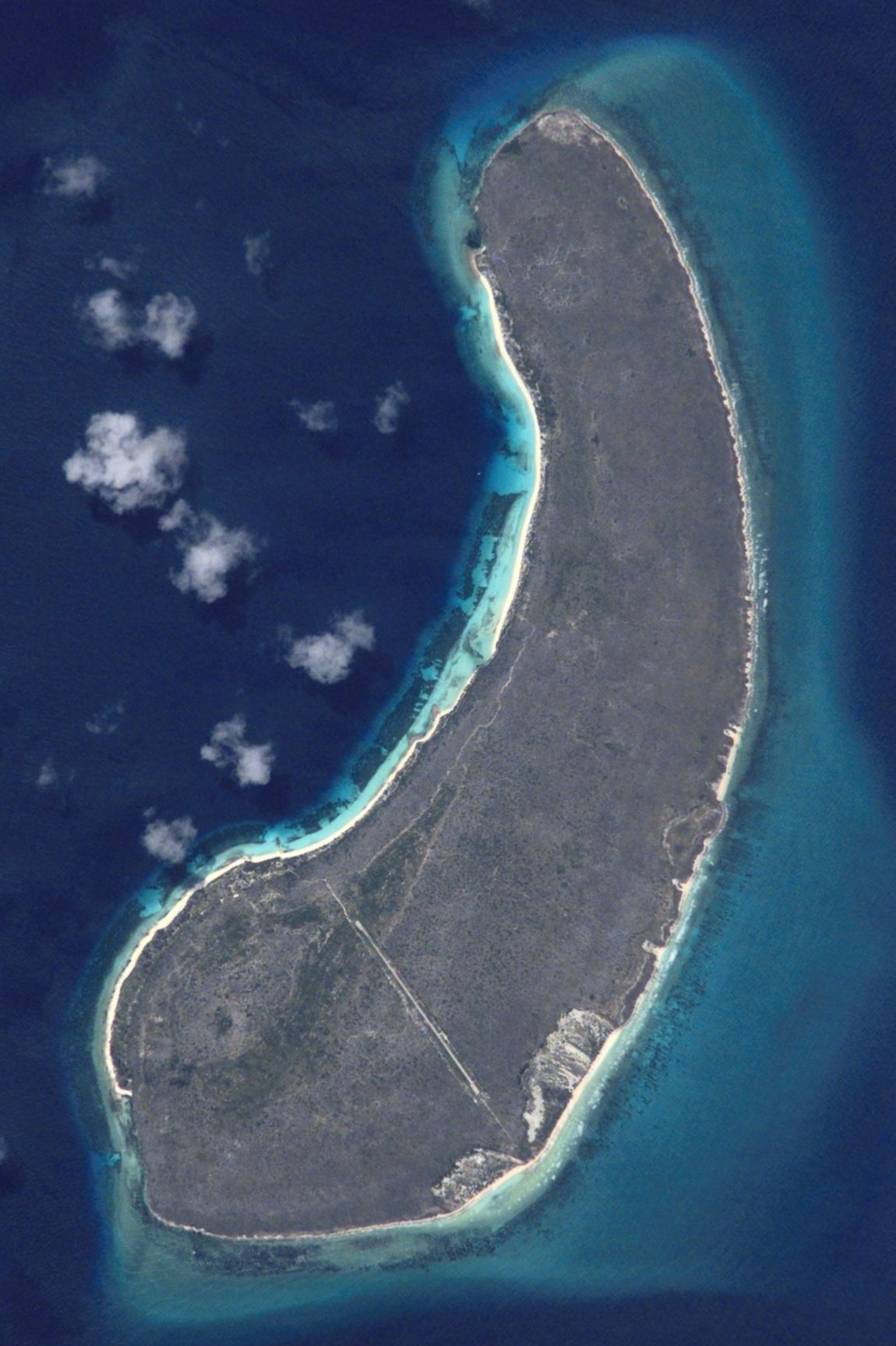
Assumption Island

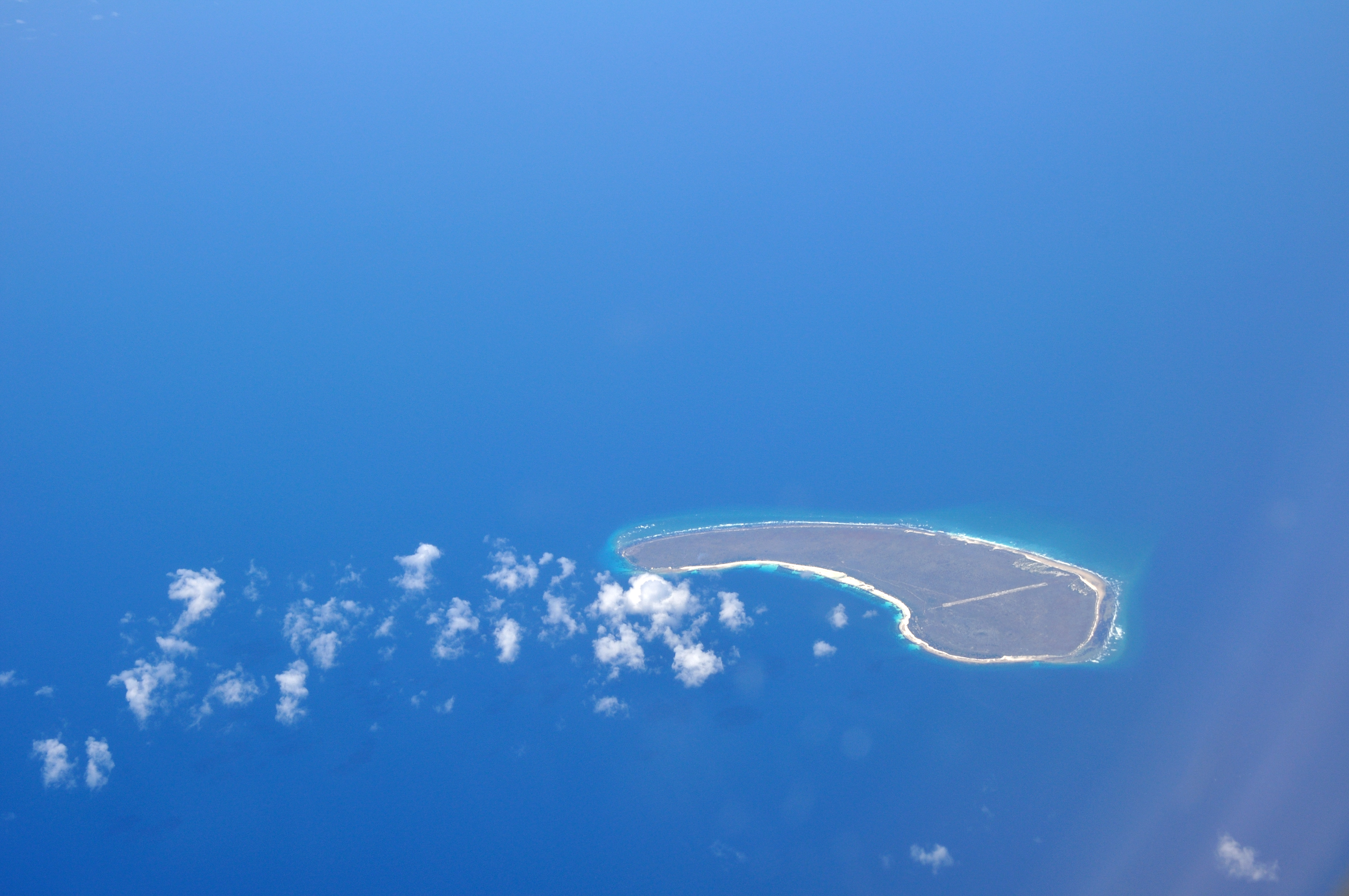
Assumption Island with its runway

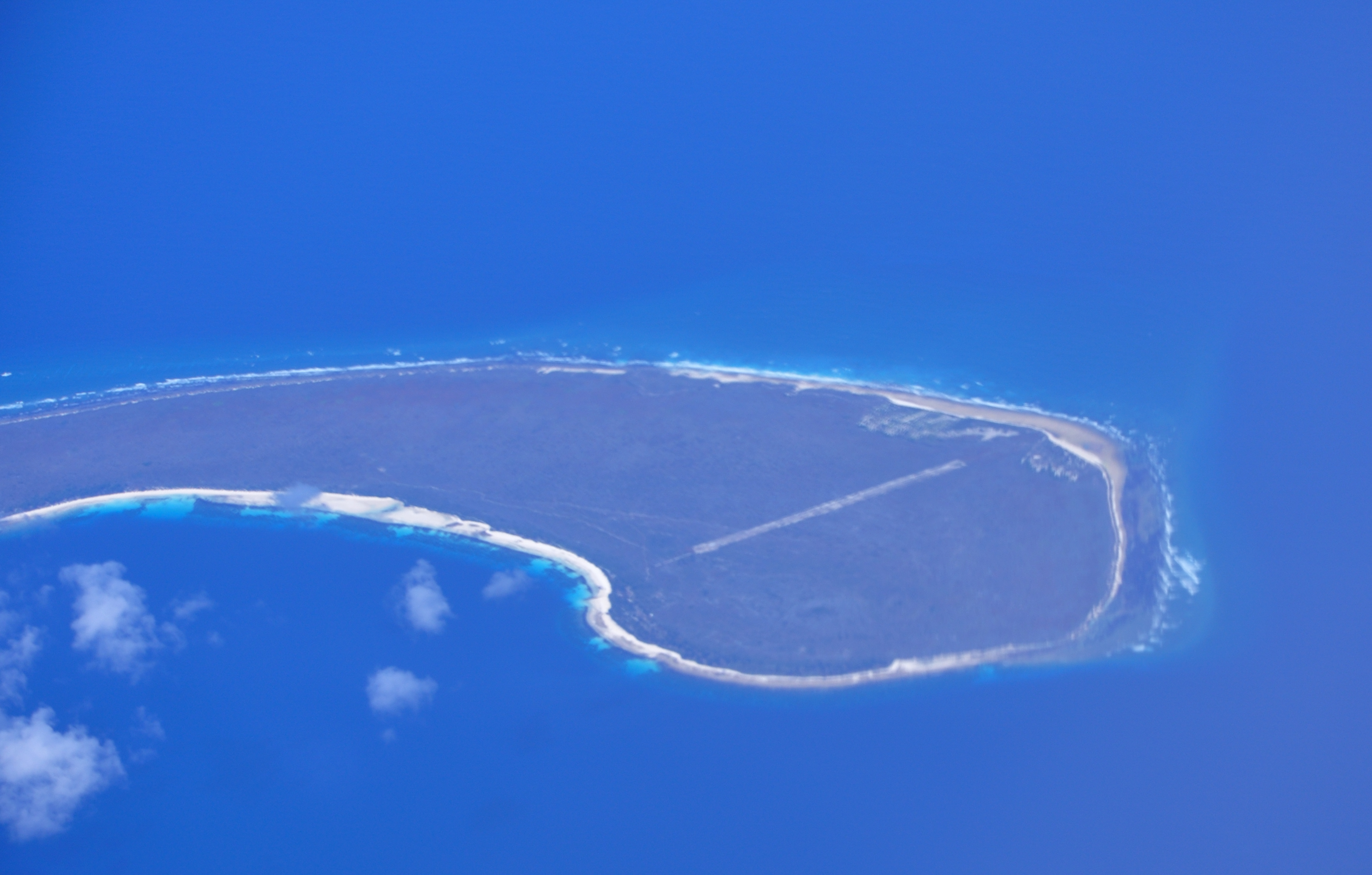
Assumption Island closer look
