= List of lighthouses in Seychelles =

This is a list of lighthouses in Seychelles.

== Lighthouses ==
Name	Image	Year built	Location & coordinates	Class of light	Focal height	NGA number	Admiralty number	Range nml
Cape Ternay Lighthouse		n/a	Mahé; 4°38′22.1″S 55°22′00.9″E	Q (2) W 10s.	21 metres (69 ft)	32816	D6871	10
Denis Lighthouse		1910	Denis Island; 3°47′56.3″S 55°39′59.8″E	Fl W 5s.	37 metres (121 ft)	32844	D6860	10
La Digue Lighthouse		n/a	La Digue Island; 4°20′51.9″S 55°49′31.6″E	Fl W 5s.	6 metres (20 ft)	32840	D6863	5
Mamelles Lighthouse		1912 est.	Mamelles Island; 4°29′04.8″S 55°32′22.2″E	Fl W 2.5s.	49 metres (161 ft)	32820	D6864	11
Pointe Cabris Lighthouse		n/a	Praslin Island; 4°21′10.3″S 55°46′14.6″E	Fl W 10s.	16 metres (52 ft)	32824	D6862	5
Pointe Zanguilles Lighthouse		n/a	Praslin Island; 4°18′18.2″S 55°44′09.4″E	Q W	16 metres (52 ft)	32828	D6862.4	5
Victoria Lighthouse		1877	Victoria; 4°37′05.4″S 55°28′10.0″E	Fl W 6s.	12 metres (39 ft)	32796	D6888	7
West Island Lighthouse		n/a	Picard Island; 9°23′53.4″S 46°12′19.6″E	Fl W 2s.	17 metres (56 ft)	32778	D6879	12

== See also ==
- Lists of lighthouses and lightvessels
