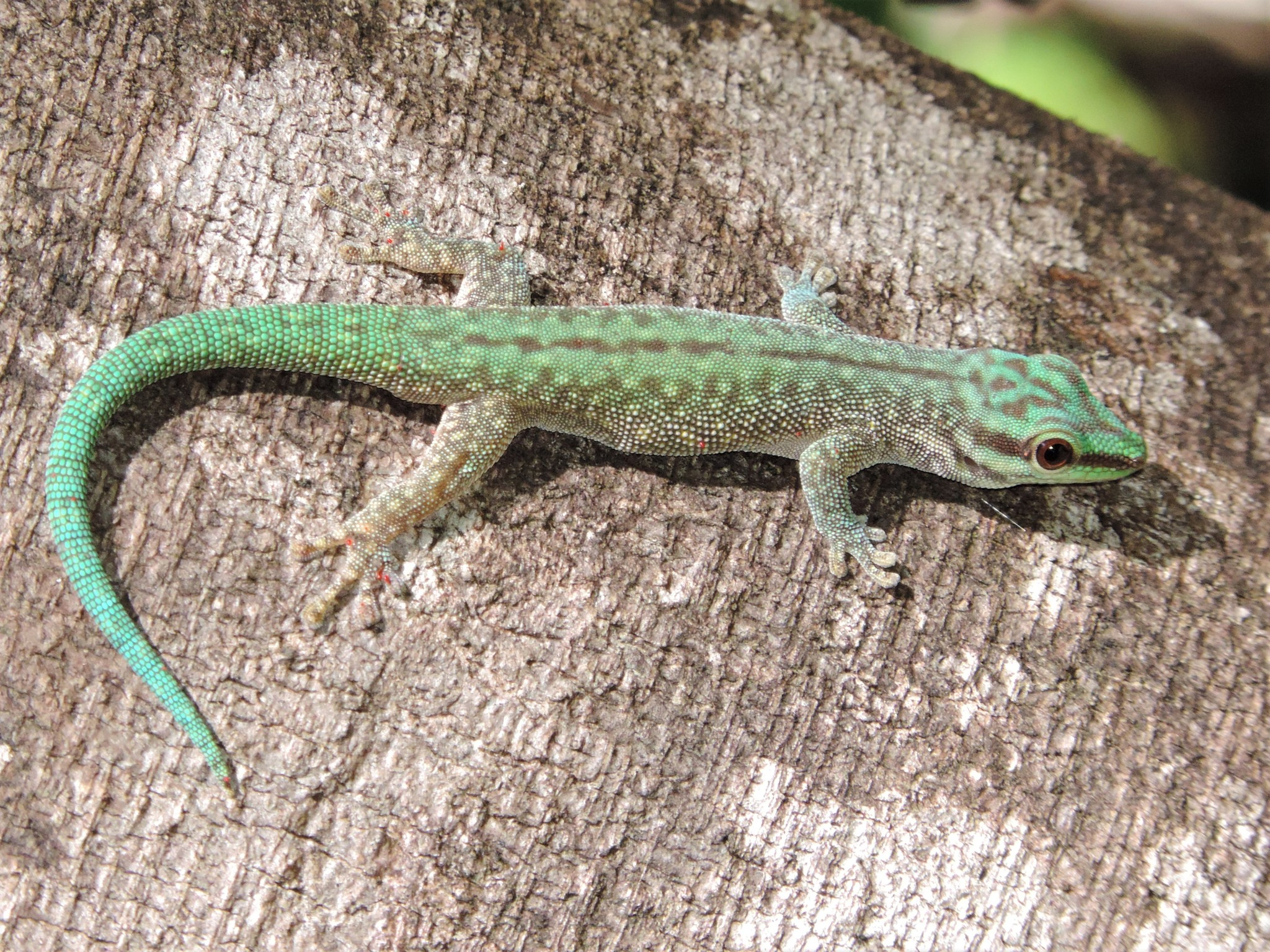

Scientific classification
- Kingdom: Animalia
- Phylum: Chordata
- Class: Reptilia
- Order: Squamata
- Suborder: Gekkota
- Family: Gekkonidae
- Genus: Phelsuma
- Species: P. abbotti
- Subspecies: P. a. chekei

Trinomial name
- Phelsuma abbotti chekei Börner & Minuth, 1984

Synonyms
- Phelsuma befotakensis Börner & Minuth, 1982 (fide Meier & Böhme, 1996); Phelsuma chekei Börner & Minuth, 1984; Phelsuma abbotti chekei — Glaw & Vences, 1994

= Cheke's day gecko =

Subspecies of lizard

Cheke's day gecko (Phelsuma abbotti chekei) is a subspecies of day gecko, a lizard in the family Gekkonidae.

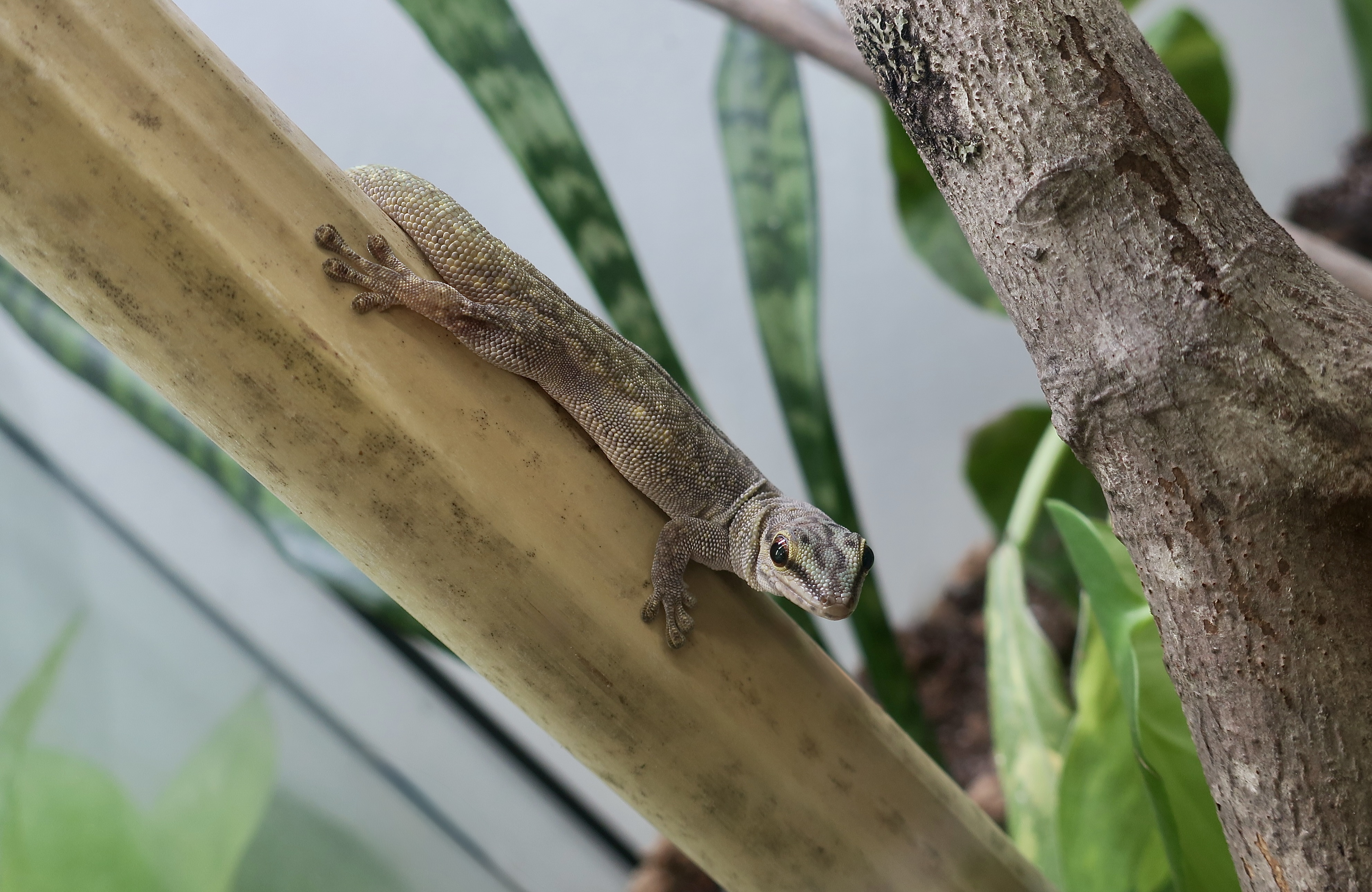
Cheke's day gecko at The Gecko Gallery NYC.

== Etymology ==
The subspecific name, chekei, is in honor of British ornithologist Anthony S. Cheke.

== Distribution ==
P. a. chekei is found on the island of Madagascar.

== Diet ==
P. a. chekei primarily eats insects and fruits.

== Reproduction ==
P. a. chekei is oviparous.
