= Picard Island =

Island in the Seychelles

- Location within Seychelles

Geography
- Location: Indian Ocean
- Coordinates: 09°22′S 46°13′E
- Archipelago: Seychelles
- Adjacent to: Indian Ocean
- Total islands: 1
- Major islands: Picard
- Area: 9.287 km^{2} (3.586 sq mi)
- Length: 3.2 km (1.99 mi)
- Width: 3.9 km (2.42 mi)
- Coastline: 25.80 km (16.031 mi)
- Highest elevation: 16 m (52 ft)
- Highest point: unnamed dune

Administration
- Seychelles
- Group: Outer Islands
- Sub-Group: Aldabra Group
- Sub-Group: Aldabra Atoll
- Districts: Outer Islands District
- Largest settlement: La Gigi (pop. 12)

Demographics
- Population: 12 (2016)
- Pop. density: 1.29/km^{2} (3.34/sq mi)
- Ethnic groups: Creole, French, East Africans, Indians.

Additional information
- Time zone: SCT (UTC+4)
- ISO code: SC-26
- Official website: www.seychelles.travel/en/discover/the-islands/outer-islands
- West Island Lighthouse
- Construction: metal skeletal tower
- Height: 12 m (39 ft)
- Markings: White
- Power source: solar power
- Focal height: 17 m (56 ft)
- Range: 12 nmi (22 km; 14 mi)
- Characteristic: Fl W 2s

Picard Island (also known as West Island), is part of the Aldabra atoll in Seychelles. As the third largest island within the Aldabra Group, it is situated 1,150 kilometres southwest of the nation's capital, Victoria. The island spans an area of 9.29 km^{2}.

Forming the northwestern edge of the Aldabra atoll, it is separated from Grand Terre (South Island) by the Passe Femme channel, which contains several small islands, and from Polymnieli Island in the west by Grand Passe. The atoll's sole habitation is the scientific base La Gigi, which now permanently stations 12 scientists.

== See also ==
- List of lighthouses in Seychelles

== Gallery ==
Map 4

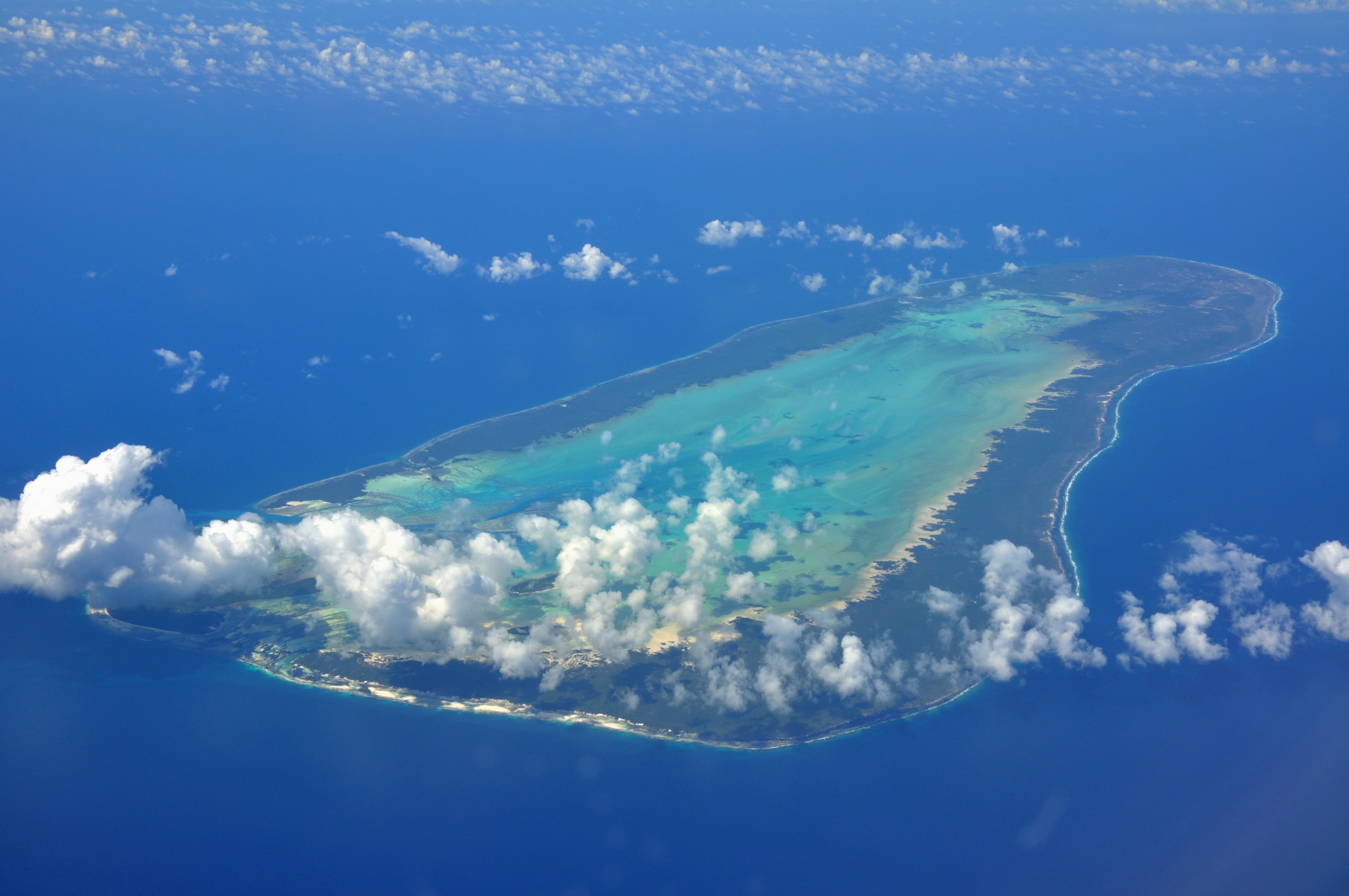
Aerial view of Aldabra
