= Manfred Börner =

German physicist

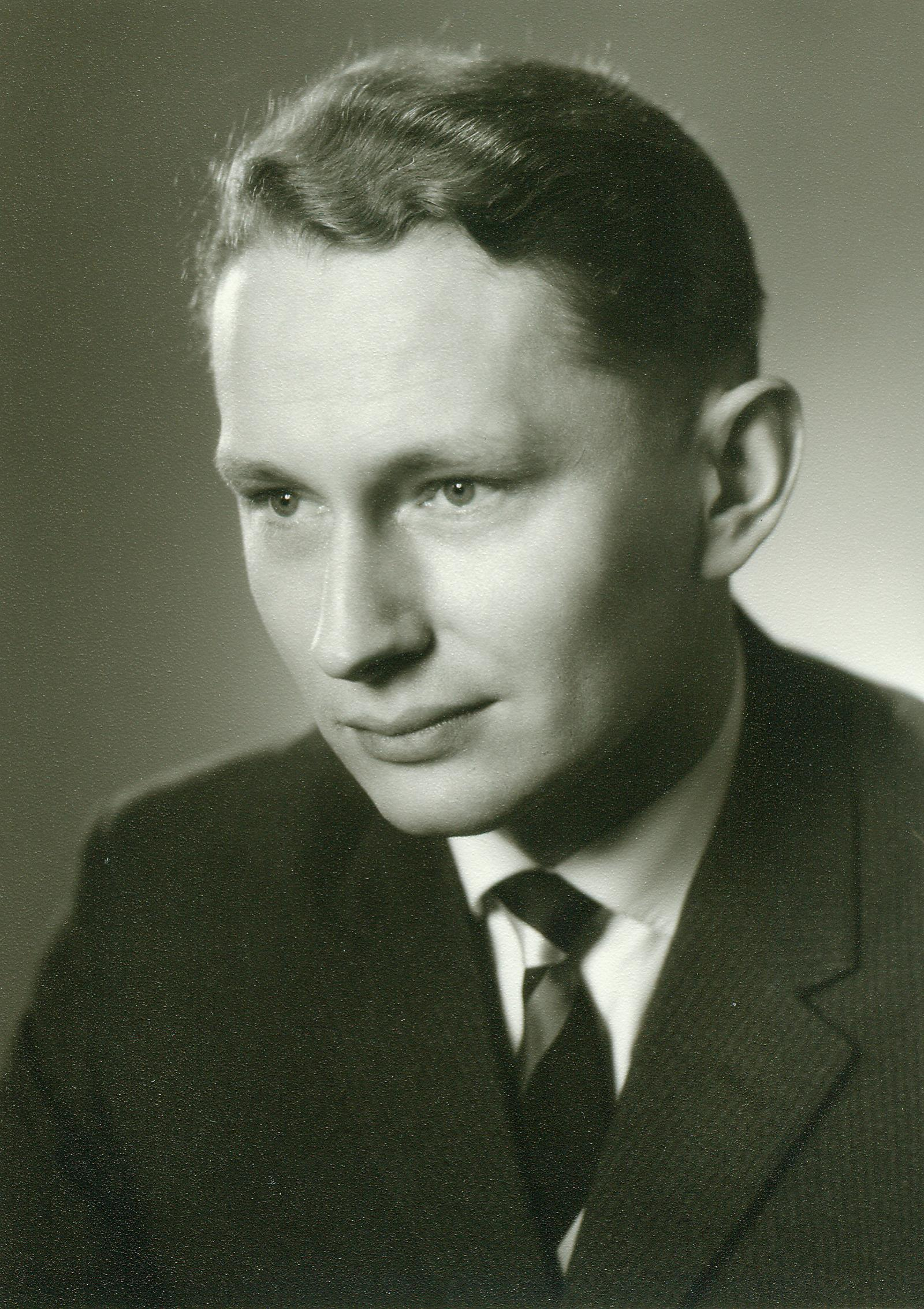
- Manfred Börner on 1960
- Born: 16 March 1929; Rochlitz
- Died: 15 January 1996 (aged 66); Ulm, Baden-Württemberg, Germany
- Occupation: Physicist

Manfred Börner (16 March 1929 in Rochlitz – 15 January 1996) was a German physicist he holds nearly 60 patents and is best known for his contributions to the development of fibre optic technology. He developed the first working optical fibre data transmission system in 1965.

== Life and career ==
From 1964, Börner's research focus increasingly shifted to laser physics and optical communications engineering. In 1965 he made a groundbreaking invention in this field. He designed an optical long-distance transmission system based on the combination of laser diodes, glass fibres and photodiodes. In 1966 he applied for a patent for the system for the company AEG-Telefunken. It was the world's first patent for a fibre optic data transmission system. All optical long-distance transmission systems still work according to this system designed by Börner.

During the years 1958 to 1966, Börner primarily dealt with the development of electronic filters for carrier frequency technology. The filters he designed subsequently replaced the previously standard analog filters, which were still made up of coils and capacitors. Börner's doctoral thesis was also created in connection with the construction of electromechanical filters.

During his work at the research institute of the company Telefunken, Börner registered a total of 57 patents. Several of the inventions patented at that time, especially in the field of optical communications technology, are still of extraordinary importance for modern fibre optic data transmission and the functionality of the Internet today.

== Awards and memberships ==
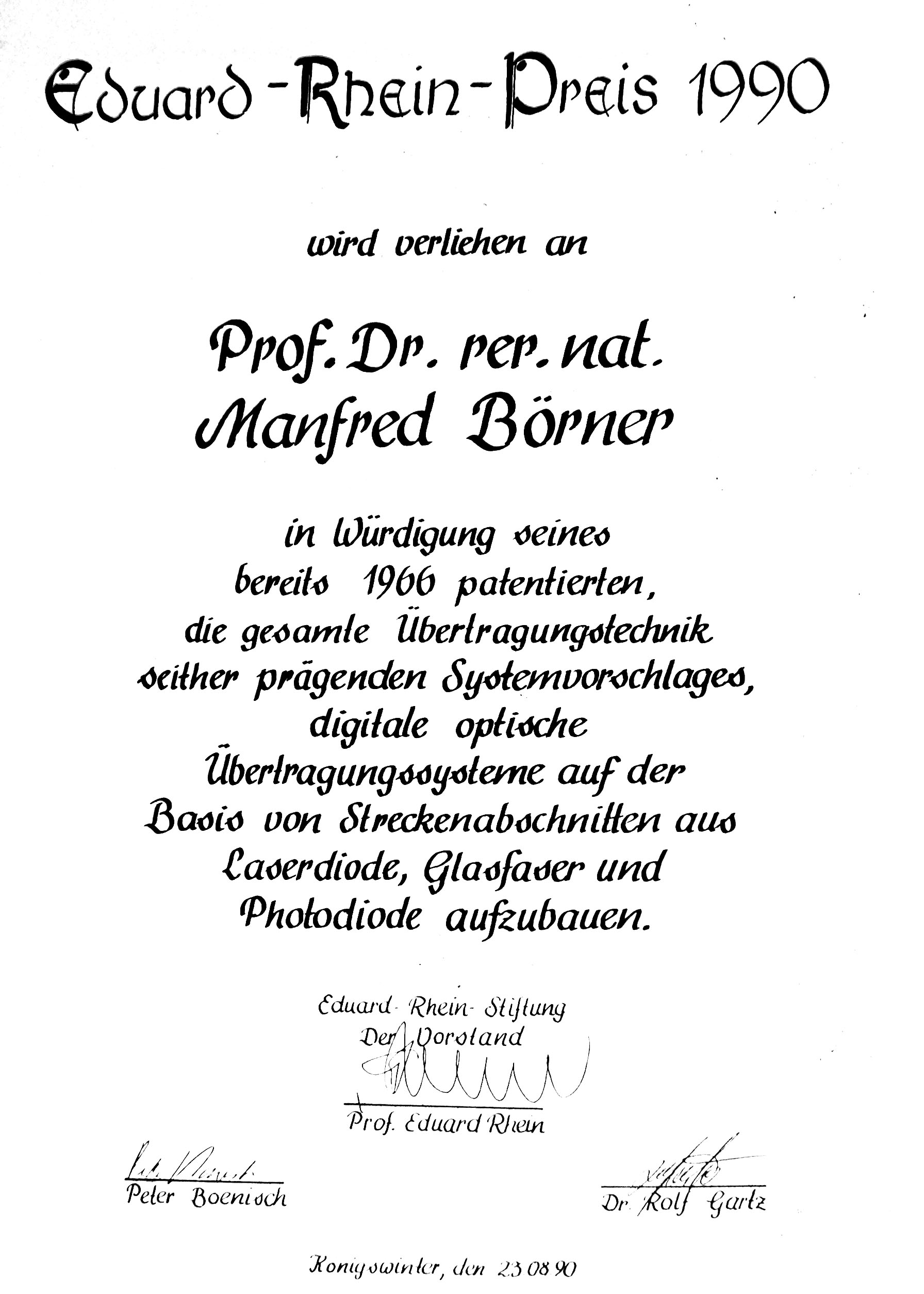
Document of the Eduard Rhein Foundation 1990

- 1962: Award of the Nachrichtentechnische Gesellschaft (NTG in the VDE; today Informationstechnische Gesellschaft) for proficiencies on the field of electromechanical filters and power-line communication
- 1982: Fellow of the Institute of Electrical and Electronics Engineers (IEEE)
- 1990: Eduard-Rhein-Award by Eduard Rhein Foundation
