= Aldabra Group =

Part of the Outer Islands of the Seychelles

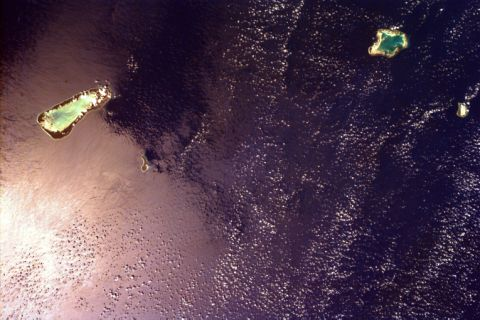
- NASA Space Shuttle photo showing all the islands of the Aldabra Group: Aldabra (top left), Assumption (below Aldabra), Cosmoledo (top right), Astove (far right)

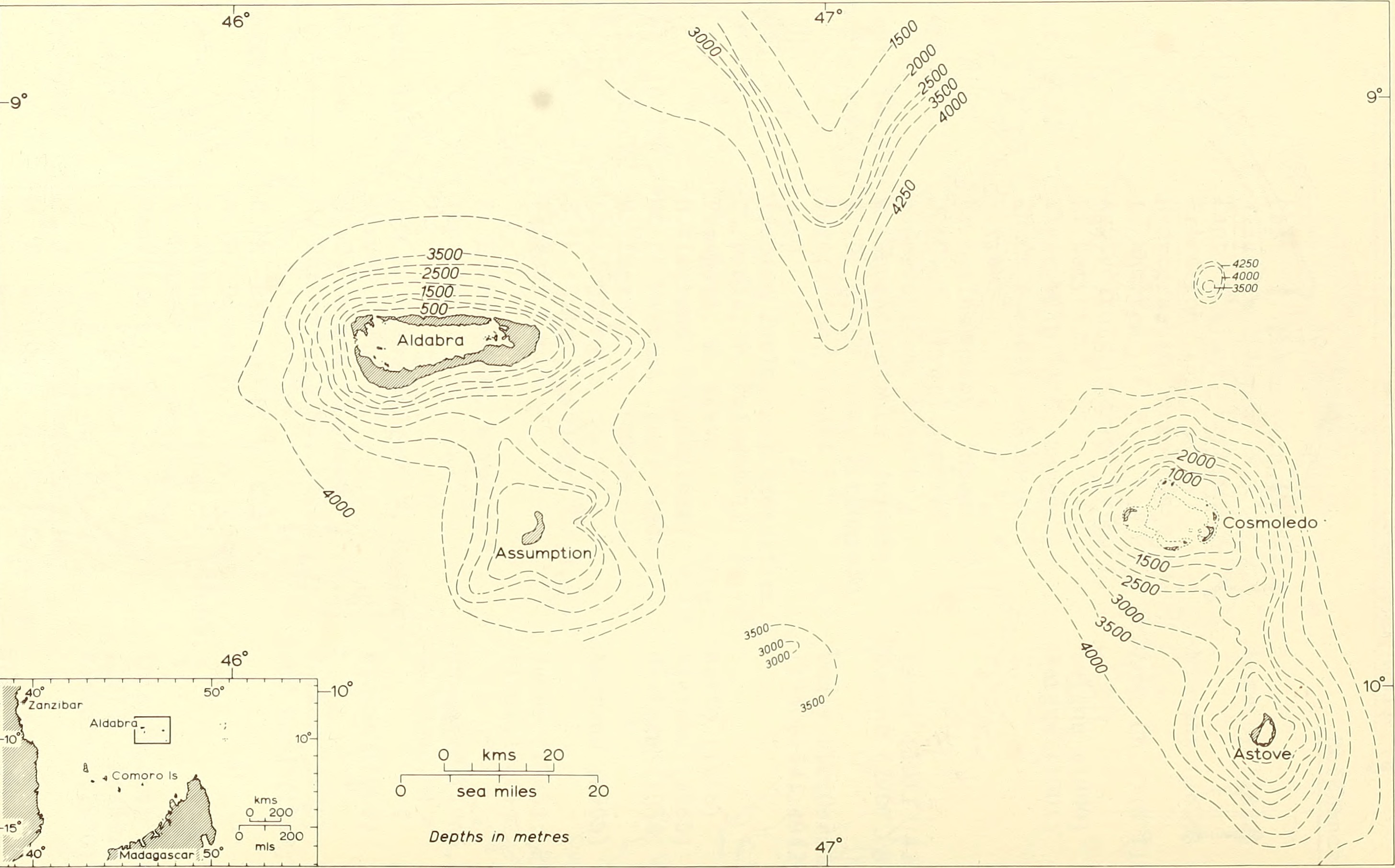
- Map of the Aldabra Group

- Location of Aldabra Group in Seychelles

Geography
- Location: Indian Ocean
- Coordinates: 09°42′S 47°3′E
- Archipelago: Seychelles
- Adjacent to: Indian Ocean
- Total islands: 100
- Major islands: Picard; Astove; Assumption
- Area: 180.03 km^{2} (69.51 sq mi)
- Highest elevation: 35 m (115 ft)
- Highest point: unnamed dune

Administration
- Seychelles
- Group: Outer Islands
- Sub-Group: Aldabra Group
- Districts: Outer Islands District
- Largest settlement: Assumption village (pop. 20)

Demographics
- Population: 34 (2016)
- Pop. density: 0.19/km^{2} (0.49/sq mi)
- Ethnic groups: Creole, French, East Africans, Indians.

Additional information
- Time zone: SCT (UTC+4)
- ISO code: SC-26
- Official website: www.seychelles.travel/en/discover/the-islands/outer-islands

The Aldabra Group are part of the Outer Islands of the Seychelles, lying in the southwest of the island nation, around 1,100 kilometres (680 miles) from the capital, Victoria, on Mahé Island.

== Population and area ==
The group contains four islands and atolls. By far the largest in terms of area is Aldabra Atoll, with a total land surface area of 155 square kilometres (60 mi^{2}), consisting of four main islands (Grand Terre, Malabar, Picard, and Polymnie) and many smaller islets. Aldabra Research Station (on Picard) was established by the Royal Society in 1971 and is Aldabra's only permanent settlement, with a small group of scientists, conservationists, and support staff. There is a small settlement on Assumption, as well as an airstrip. There are small lodges on Astove and Wizard Island, Cosmoledo Atoll. The total land area of the Aldabra Group is 180.03 km^{2}.

== Islands in the Aldabra group ==
1. Aldabra Atoll (a raised atoll with four main and some 40 small islets)
2. Assumption Island (a single island on a raised reef)
3. Cosmoledo Atoll (a raised atoll with two main and about 18 smaller islets)
4. Astove Island (a raised atoll with just one island)
