= Friedrich Boerner =

German physician (1723–1761)

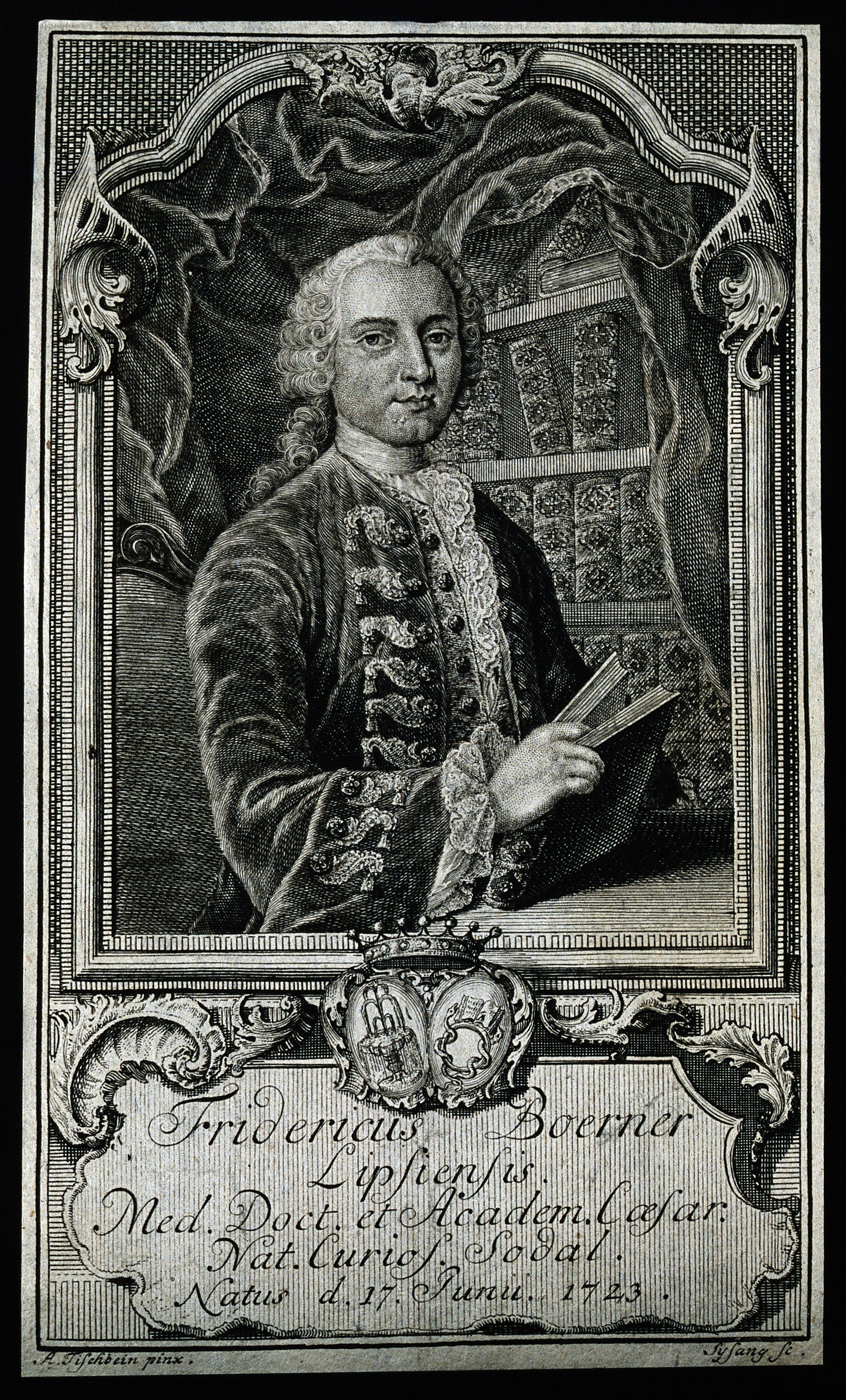
Portrait. Credit: Wellcome Library

Friedrich Boerner or Börner (17 June 1723 – 30 June 1761) was a German physician.

Boerner was born in Leipzig, Electorate of Saxony. His father, Christian Friedrich Boerner, wanted him to study theology and he started to study theology at the University of Wittenberg, but eventually he finish medicine. He was a professor of this university until he had to come back to Leipzig the raising of Seven Years' War (1756–63). He died in Leipzig in 1761.

== Works ==
- De arte gymnastica nova, Dissertation, Helmstedt 1748
- Nachrichten von den vornehmsten Lebensumständen und Schriften jetztlebender berühmter Ärzte und Naturforscher in und um Deutschland, 1748–1764 14 Stück in 3 Bänden
- Untersuchung der Frage: Ob dem Frauenzimmer erlaubt sey, die Arzncykunst auszuüben? Leipzig 1750
- Commentatio de Alexandro Benedicto, medicinae post literas renatas restauratore. Braunschweig 1751
- Comment, de vita, moribus, meritis et scriptis Hieronyini Mercurialis, Forolivicnsis. Braunschweig 1751
- Comment, de Cosma et Damiano, artis medicae olim et adhuc hodie hinc illincque tutelaribus. Cum tabb. aen. Helmstedt 1751
- Comment. de vita et meritis Martini Pollichii, Mellerstadii, primi in Academia Vitembergensi Rectoris Magnifici et Prof. med. Wolfenbüttel 1751
- Bibliothecae libiorum rariorum physico – medicorum historico – criticae. Specimen I. Helmstedt 1751 – Specimen II. Helmstedt 1752
- Super locum Hippocratis, in iureiurando maxime vexatum, meditationes. Leipzig 1752
- Noctes Guelphicae, sive opuscu’a argumenti med. Litterarii, 1755
- Relationes de libris physico- medicis etc. Fasc. I, 1756
- Memoriae professorum medicinae in Academia Vittebergensi, inde a primis illius initiis renovatae Spec. I. II., 1755, 1756

== Bibliography ==
- www.zedler-lexikon.de
