= Susanne Börner =

German archaeologist and numismatist

- Born: 1980 (age 45–46)

Academic background
- Education: University of Mannheim University of Heidelberg
- Thesis: Marc Aurel im Spiegel seiner Münzen und Medaillons. Eine vergleichende Analyse der stadtrömischen Prägungen zwischen 138 und 180 n. Chr. (2011)

Academic work
- Discipline: Archaeology Numismatics
- Institutions: University of Heidelberg

Susanne Börner (born 1980) is a German archaeologist and numismatist.

== Education ==
Susanne Börner studied Ancient History, Classical Archaeology, as well as Medieval Studies and Modern History at the universities of Mannheim and Heidelberg from 2000 to 2005. In 2011, she received her doctorate from the University of Heidelberg with a dissertation on the topic "Marcus Aurelius in the Light of His Coins and Medallions: A Comparative Analysis of Roman Minting between 138 and 180 AD" (German Marc Aurel im Spiegel seiner Münzen und Medaillons. Eine vergleichende Analyse der stadtrömischen Prägungen zwischen 138 und 180 n. Chr.).

== Career ==
Since 2014, Börner has been employed as a research associate at the University of Heidelberg. Initially, she took on the leadership and coordination of various projects. Since July 2019, she has held a permanent position as a research associate at the Department of Ancient History and Epigraphy. Since 2015, Börner has managed the Center for Ancient Numismatics (ZAN) and serves as the curator of the coin collection at the Center for Ancient Studies.

In addition to her work at the University of Heidelberg, Börner has been active since 2016 as the academic coordinator of the Numismatic Association in Baden-Württemberg (NV BW) and, since 2018, as the deputy spokesperson of the KENOM Consortium. Since 2021, she has represented the subject areas “Numismatic Associations” and “Numismatic eLearning” within the Numismatic Commission of the German Federal States.

== Awards ==
- 2005: Artes Liberales AbsolventUM Award
- 2021: Honorary Award of the Society for International Monetary History (Ehrenpreis der Gesellschaft für internationale Geldgeschichte)

== Select publications ==
- "Marc Aurel im Spiegel seiner Münzen und Medaillons: eine vergleichende Analyse der stadtrömischen Prägungen zwischen 138 und 180 n.Chr.", Antiquitas. Abhandlungen zur alten Geschicht, vol. 58, Bonn: Habelt, 2012, ISBN 978-3-7749-3769-7
- with Thomas Kreckel, ed. (2013), Geld regiert die Welt. Münzfunde aus Schwarzenacker (studentische Begleitpublikation zur neuen numismatischen Dauerausstellung des Römermuseums Homburg-Schwarzenacker), Dillingen: Krüger Druck + Verlag, ISBN 978-3-9815821-0-9
