= Seychelles Islands Foundation =

Ecological conservation public trust

The Seychelles Islands Foundation (SIF) is a public trust established to manage and protect the two UNESCO World Heritage Sites in Seychelles: Aldabra and Vallée de Mai.

== History ==
The foundation was established as a public trust in 1979, with the President of Seychelles as patron to manage and protect Aldabra Atoll and Vallée de Mai. Its formation was driven by the need for an independent, science-based institution to oversee the conservation of Seychelles’ ecological sites, particularly those at risk due to their isolation and sensitivity.

=== Governance ===
The foundation's Board of Trustees, appointed by the President, has 14 members, including at least five representatives from organizations concerned with the conservation of wildlife and natural history, or national academies of science.

== Managed sites ==
=== Aldabra Atoll ===
Aldabra, one of the largest raised coral atolls in the world, was designated a UNESCO World Heritage Site in 1982 and has been managed by the foundation since 1981. It is home to the largest population of Aldabra giant tortoise on Earth, as well as many endemic species of birds, plants, and marine life. Due to its remoteness and fragility, human access is highly restricted.

Since 2014, the foundation has annually monitored Aldabra’s coral reefs, documenting changes through major bleaching events in 2016 and 2024 and providing key insights into their resilience and recovery.

=== Vallée de Mai ===
Located on Praslin Island, Vallée de Mai is a prehistoric palm forest that is home to the Coco de Mer palm (Lodoicea maldivica), as well as several rare bird species like the Seychelles black parrot. It was inscribed as a UNESCO World Heritage Site in 1983. The reserve is managed by the foundation since 1989.
