= Aldabra =

Coral atoll in the Indian Ocean

Aldabra Atoll
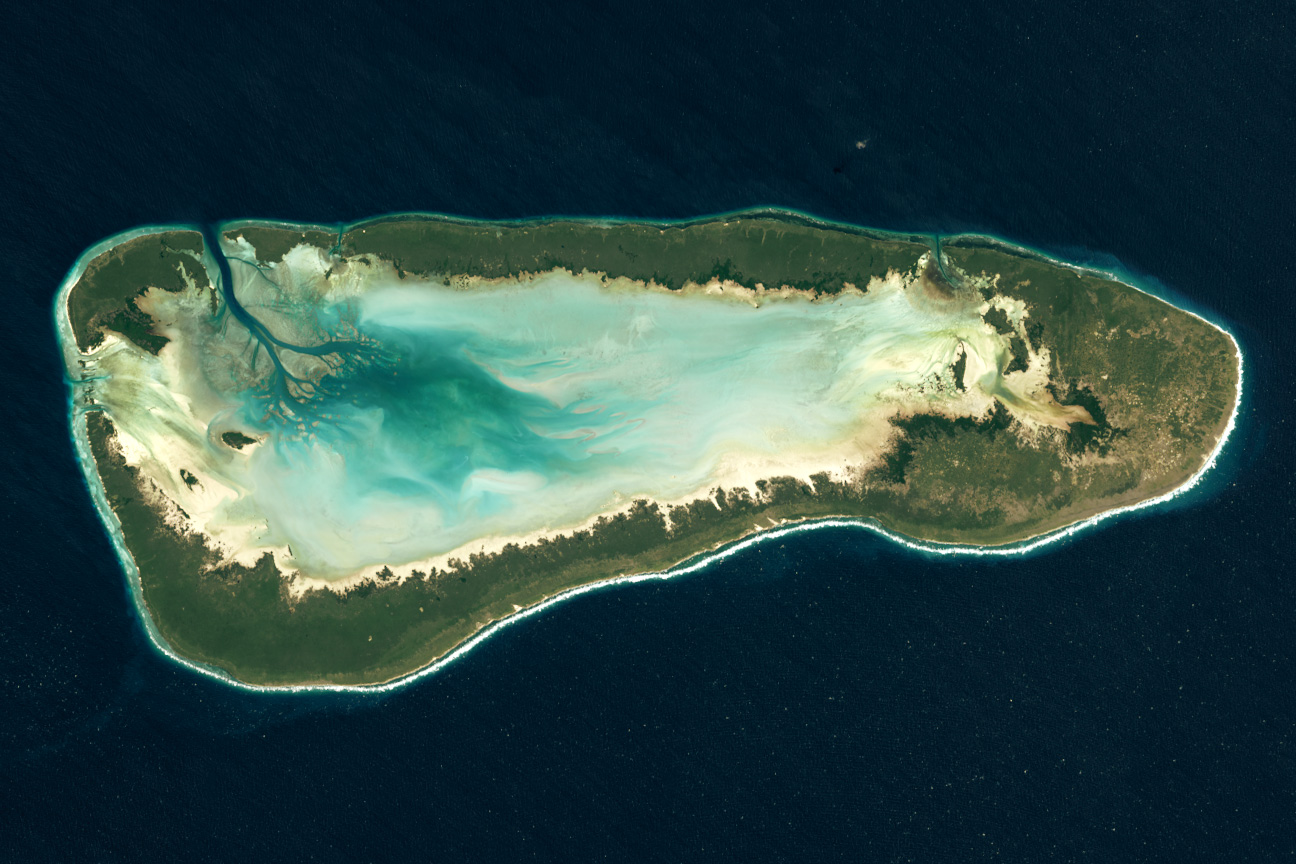
- Satellite view of Aldabra

- Location of Aldabra Atoll in Seychelles

Geography
- Location: Indian Ocean
- Coordinates: 09°25′S 46°21′E
- Archipelago: Seychelles
- Adjacent to: Indian Ocean
- Total islands: 46
- Major islands: Picard; Malabar; Grande Terre; Polymnie
- Area: 155.4 km^{2} (60.0 sq mi)
- Length: 34 km (21.1 mi)
- Width: 13 km (8.1 mi)
- Coastline: 85 km (52.8 mi)
- Highest elevation: 16 m (52 ft)
- Highest point: unnamed dune

Administration
- Seychelles
- Group: Outer Islands
- Sub-Group: Aldabra Group
- Sub-Group: Aldabra Atoll
- Districts: Outer Islands District
- Largest settlement: La Gigi (pop. 12)

Demographics
- Population: 12 (2016)
- Pop. density: 0.08/km^{2} (0.21/sq mi)
- Ethnic groups: Creole, French, East Africans, Indians.

Additional information
- Time zone: SCT (UTC+4)
- ISO code: SC-26
- Official website: www.seychelles.travel/en/discover/the-islands/outer-islands

UNESCO World Heritage Site
- Criteria: Natural: vii, ix, x
- Reference: 185
- Inscription: 1982 (6th Session)

IUCN Category Ia (Strict Nature Reserve)
- Designated: 1981

Ramsar Wetland
- Official name: Aldabra Atoll
- Designated: 2 February 2010
- Reference no.: 1887

Aldabra, the world's second-largest coral atoll (the largest is Kiritimati), is located east of the continent of Africa. It is part of the Aldabra Group of islands in the Indian Ocean that are part of the Outer Islands of the Seychelles, with a distance of 1,120 km (700 mi) southwest of the capital, Victoria on Mahé Island.

== History ==
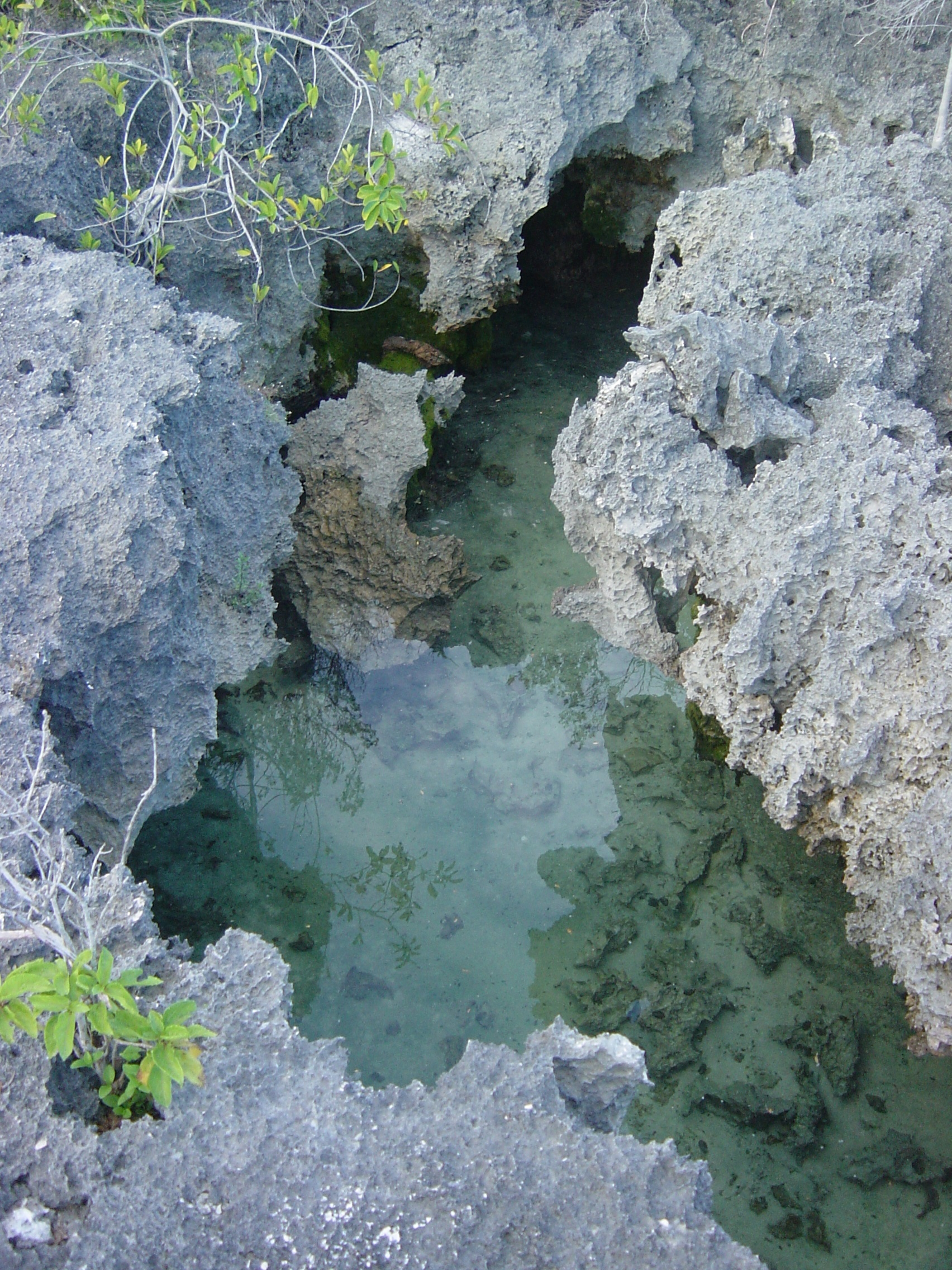
Pool of water on Aldabra Atoll

The name Aldabra, originally Al-Hadra or Al-Khadra (with several variants), was given by Arab seafarers for "the atoll's harsh, sun-baked environment"; this name was included in the Portuguese maps of the 16th century. The islands were already known to the Persians and Arabs, from whom they got their name. They had named the Indian Ocean as Bahr-el zanj. It was visited by Portuguese navigators in 1511. In the middle of the 18th century, the atoll became a dependency of the French colony of Réunion, from where expeditions were made for the capture of the Aldabra giant tortoises.

As there are no surface freshwater sources on Aldabra, the interests of the explorers (no proof of any European explorer's visit prior to 1742) was only to exploit the species of tortoise, turtle and fish, and not to inhabit the atoll. In 1810, with Mauritius, Réunion, the Seychelles and other islands, Aldabra passed into the possession of Great Britain. Réunion was later returned to France, and Mauritius gained possession of Aldabra as well as the rest of the Seychelles. The previous inhabitants were emigrants from the Seychelles.

Admiral W. J. L. Wharton of the British Navy landed in Aldabra in 1878 to conduct hydrographic surveys of the islands. In 1888, the first settlement was established after the Concession was granted by the Seychelles authorities. The intention was to exploit and export the natural resources of the islands. The villagers built a chapel, in the middle of the badamier trees, using timber and steel; the chapel was considered an essential addition to the plantation houses and office buildings. As Aldabra had no freshwater resources, large rectangular-shaped water storage structures were built adjoining each building. A two-roomed jail was also built in the village, a remnant of which is extant.

The exploitation of tortoises for commercial purposes at that time is illustrated by the remnants of a crushing mill at Picard Island, which was used to crush bones of tortoises, which were also brought in from other islands in the atoll. Efforts made to grow plantation crops of coconuts, cotton, and sisal failed due to inadequate water sources on the atoll; relics of these plantations are still found on some of the islands. In the late 19th century, goats were introduced as a food source for the villagers (about 200) living there. Ship rats were inadvertently introduced and recorded before 1870, and house geckos were noted from the 1970s. Sailors landed on the atoll in the 19th century and captured tortoises as food; in 1842, two ships were reported to have taken 1200 of them. By 1900, the tortoises were nearly extinct, and a crew would often have to hunt for three days to find one.

In the early 1800s, concessions given to individuals almost destroyed the forests and tortoise habitats in many islands in Seychelles; on Aldabra Atoll, in view of its remoteness and rugged topography, only small areas of forests were cleared for agricultural operations (mostly coconut plantations) but the tortoises were intensely captured for meat and trade. However, James Spurs, who had the concession of the atoll, was responsible initially for saving the tortoises on the atoll when he banned killing them in 1891.

Following World War II, exploitation of Aldabra for commercial use came to an end and restrictions were imposed on the number of people who could stay on the islands; this number was fixed at 200 at a time. Introduction of invasive species was banned, faunal species were protected under law, and active research on the ecology and biodiversity of the atoll was undertaken by the Royal Society of London from the mid-1970s.

Aldabra, along with Desroches and Farquhar, was part of the British Indian Ocean Territory from 1965 until Seychelles' independence in 1976. In the 1960s, as a part of their "Ocean Island Policy", and to support East of Suez commitments, the British government considered establishing an RAF base on the island and invited the United States to help fund the project in return for shared use of the facility and a settlement of 11 million dollars. Simultaneously (mid-1960s), the British Broadcasting Corporation became interested in Aldabra as a possible transmitter site, to broadcast the BBC Overseas Service (BBC) into the African mainland. The BBC mounted a fact-finding expedition (Expedition Turtle) to assess its suitability for this purpose. The BBC relied on the RAF for developing the atoll as without this their project would not have been feasible.

After an international protest by scientists, known as the "Aldabra Affair", however, the military plans were abandoned and the atoll instead received full protection. The "Environmental lobbyists" under the leadership of Julian Huxley, with the support of MPs Tam Dalyell and Robin Cook, got the British venture torpedoed. In 1966, British Defence Minister Denis Healey had observed: "As I understand it, the island of Aldabra is inhabited – like Her Majesty's Opposition Front bench – by giant turtles, frigate birds and boobies."

Subsequent to the thwarting of plans to establish a military station at Aldabra (which instead focused on Diego Garcia in the Chagos Islands), the Royal Society of London resumed their scientific study of the flora and fauna of the atoll with Professor David Stoddart as the leader. The Royal Society bought the lease of the atoll in 1970 and their research station became functional from 1970. After completion of their assigned work, the Royal Society left and the Seychelles Islands Foundation (SIF), a public trust of Seychelles, assumed management and protection of the atoll in 1979. SIF functions under the patronage of the President of Seychelles and Aldabra was declared a Special Nature Reserve in 1981; it became a UNESCO World Heritage Site on 19 November 1982. A brass plaque inscribed with the citation "Aldabra, wonder of nature given to humanity by the people of the Republic of Seychelles" was erected on the atoll. This appreciation befits the atoll which is truly one of the greatest ecologically undisturbed raised coral atolls in the world.

== Geography ==
Aldabra atoll is in the most southwesterly part of the Seychelles, and is closer to the coast of Africa 630 km (390 mi) than to Mahé. It is 407 km (253 mi) northwest of Madagascar and 440 km (270 mi) from Moroni on the Comoro Islands. The atoll is the largest raised coral reef in the world with an elevation of 8 metres (26 ft); and the second-largest atoll in the world after Kiritimati Atoll. It lies at 9°24′S 46°22′E and belongs to the Aldabra Group, one of the island groups of the Outer Islands of the Seychelles, which includes the island of Assumption and the atolls of Astove and Cosmoledo. Aldabra atoll is 34 kilometres (21 mi) long (in east–west direction) and 13 kilometres (8.1 mi) wide. It has a large shallow lagoon,196 square kilometres (76 sq mi) in area, which is about two-thirds dry during low tide. The lagoon is encircled by fringing coral reef.

Around the rim of the lagoon are the larger islands of the atoll. The total land area of the atoll is 155.4 square kilometres (60.0 sq mi). The size including the lagoon is 380 square kilometres (150 sq mi). The outside rim of the atoll has three passages which connect to the lagoon, which is 6–10 kilometres (3.7–6.2 mi) in width where it opens to the sea. The water depth in the lagoon averages about 5 metres (16 ft); however, the passages that open to the sea are up to 20 metres (66 ft) deep and strongly affected by tidal currents.

=== List of islands ===
Aldabra atoll has, besides the four larger islands, some 40 smaller islands and rocks, all inside the lagoon, as well as a few very small islets at the West Channels between Grand Terre Island and Picard Islands, the largest of those being Îlot Magnan.

- Îlot Magnan 0.032 square kilometres (0.012 sq mi).

	Island	Sobriquet	type	Location	Area (hectares)	Coastline (km)	Length (km)	Width (km)	Elevation (m)
1	Picard	West	island	09°22′55″S 46°13′10″E	928.70	25.80	3.20	3.90	0.00
2	Polymnie		island	09°22′28″S 46°15′35″E	193.60	10.40	1.01	3.42	0.00
3	North Niçois	Îlot Niçois Nord	island	09°22′47″S 46°15′27″E	2.80	0.94	0.38	0.09	0.00
4	South Niçois	Îlot Niçois Sud	island	09°22′48″S 46°15′20″E	0.73	0.35	0.13	0.06	0.00
5	Gros	Gros ÎIot Gionnet	island	09°22′56″S 46°16′28″E	4.00	1.08	0.40	0.12	0.00
6	Petite	Petite ÎIot Gionnet	island	09°22′53″S 46°16′26″E	0.48	0.29	0.10	0.05	0.00
7	Malabar	Middle	island	09°22′50″S 46°20′00″E	2650.50	52.5	2.00	17.70	0.00
8	Verte	Île Verte	island	09°22′59″S 46°26′04″E	4.15	1.50	0.43	0.12	0.00
9	Marquoix	Îlot Marquoix	island	09°23′05″S 46°25′56″E	1.62	0.88	0.25	0.11	0.00
10	North Coconut		island	09°23′38″S 46°27′30″E	52.30	4.40	0.9	0.7	0.00
11	South Coconut		island	09°24′12″S 46°27′40″E	58.10	4.26	1.1	0.6	0.00
12	Michael	Île Michel	island	09°24′28″S 46°26′55″E	37.00	5.57	1.45	0.44	0.00
13	Petit Mentor	Petit Mentor Endans	island	09°26′13″S 46°22′10″E	0.10	0.10	0.03	0.03	0.00
14	Gros	Gros ÎIot Sésame	island	09°27′25″S 46°15′53″E	2.35	0.93	0.36	0.07	0.00
15	Petit	Petit ÎIot Sésame	island	09°27′34″S 46°15′58″E	0.20	0.20	0.06	0.04	0.00
16	Grand Terre	South	island	09°28′00″S 46°19′00″E	11400	106.65	34.10	8.50	0.00
17	Moustiques	Île Moustiques	island	09°26′15″S 46°14′11″E	29.30	3.10	0.9	0.4	0.00
18	Euphrates	Île Esprit	island	09°25′40″S 46°15′00″E	36.10	2.77	1.05	0.5	0.00
19	Sylvestre West		island	09°25′37″S 46°15′22″E	0.40	0.30	0.05	0.1	0.00
20	Sylvestre East		island	09°25′36″S 46°15′26″E	0.20	0.20	0.05	0.04	0.00
21	Chalen		island	09°25′07″S 46°13′36″E	0.35	0.50	0.18	0.1	0.00
22	Grabeau		island	09°25′00″S 46°12′42″E	1.24	0.00	0.00	0.00	0.00
22	Grande Magnan	Îlot Grande Magnan	island	09°25′00″S 46°12′42″E	5.15	0.00	0.00	0.00	0.00
22	Petite Magnan	Îlot Petite Magnan	island	09°25′00″S 46°21′00″E	2.36	0.00	0.00	0.00	0.00
22	Lanier		island	09°25′00″S 46°21′00″E	1.03	0.00	0.00	0.00	0.00
22	Dubois		island	09°25′00″S 46°21′00″E	2.73	0.00	0.00	0.00	0.00
22	Yangue		island	09°25′00″S 46°21′00″E	1.65	0.00	0.00	0.00	0.00
22	Emile		island	09°25′00″S 46°21′00″E	5.05	0.00	0.00	0.00	0.00
	Aldabra Atoll		Atoll	09°25′00″S 46°21′00″E	15520.00				16

More Islands (unspecified location, but sizes are included under "Other Islands":

- Île aux Cendres
- Îlot Parc
- Champignon des Os
- Grand Mentor
- Grand ÎIot
- Heron Rock
- Hide Island
- Île aux Aigrettes
- Île aux Cèdres
- Îles Chalands
- Île Fangame
- Île Héron
- Île Suacco
- Îlot Déder
- Îlot du Sud
- Îlot du Milieu
- Îlot du Nord
- Îlot Macoa
- Îlot Salade
- Middle Row Island
- Nobby Rock
- North Row Island
- Petit Mentor
- Petits ÎIots
- Pink Rock
- South Row Island
- Table Ronde

== Geology ==
The atoll reflects both fossil and geomorphological features, the former is the source of the biodiversity seen today. The atoll consists of reef limestone of Pleistocene age (with irregular coral formations called "champignon", made up of two layers of varying stages of crystallization) and this extends over an average width of 2 kilometres (1.2 mi) rising to a height of 8 metres (26 ft) above sea level, and forming the rim line (low cliffs with "deep notches, preceded by jagged pinnacles") of the shallow central lagoon. Geologically the limestone beds have been subjected to striation, sink holes and pits with prominent and continuous limestone bed on the eastern side above the sediment deposits.

The coastline has undercut limestone cliffs above a perched beach; it is in two clear terraces of 8 metres (26 ft) and 6 metres (20 ft) height above sea level. While the terrestrial topography (spread over an elevation range of 0–8 metres (0–26 ft)) is rugged and dictated by the geomorphic conditions, the land surface comprises limestone of about 125,000 years age, which has uplifted many times above the sea level. The surface conditions are criss-crossed and riddled with pot holes and pits. In the eastern zone of the lagoon, though the surface is continuous, sediment beds are also seen. The windward southern coast is made up of sand dunes.

== Climate and tides ==
Aldabra is situated in the dry zone of the south-west Indian Ocean. The northwest monsoon season is from November to March and brings the heaviest rainfall. In the remaining months, the south-easterly trade winds are dominant. Aldabra receives an annual average rainfall of 960 millimetres (38 in). Cyclones are rare in the Seychelles due to its nearness to the Equator. The reported monthly mean maximum air temperature recorded in December is 31 °C (88 °F). The mean minimum temperature recorded in August is 22 °C (72 °F).

The hydrodynamics of Aldabra's lagoon are dominated by the tides. The maximum tidal range at Aldabra is around 2.7m, which is exceptionally large for an atoll. Flow between the lagoon and open ocean is only possible through a small number of narrow channels, generating tidal currents of over 3 m/s at Passe Gionnet, and over 1 m/s at most other channels. Due to the restriction of water exchange through these channels, tides within the lagoon are lagged compared to the open ocean, and the tidal range varies across the lagoon.

Aldabra sits in the path of the Indian Ocean's westward-flowing South Equatorial Current. Eddies are generated in the wake of Aldabra as the South Equatorial Current passes it, driving upwelling of deep waters that bring nutrients to the surface, and drive phytoplankton growth.

== Wildlife ==
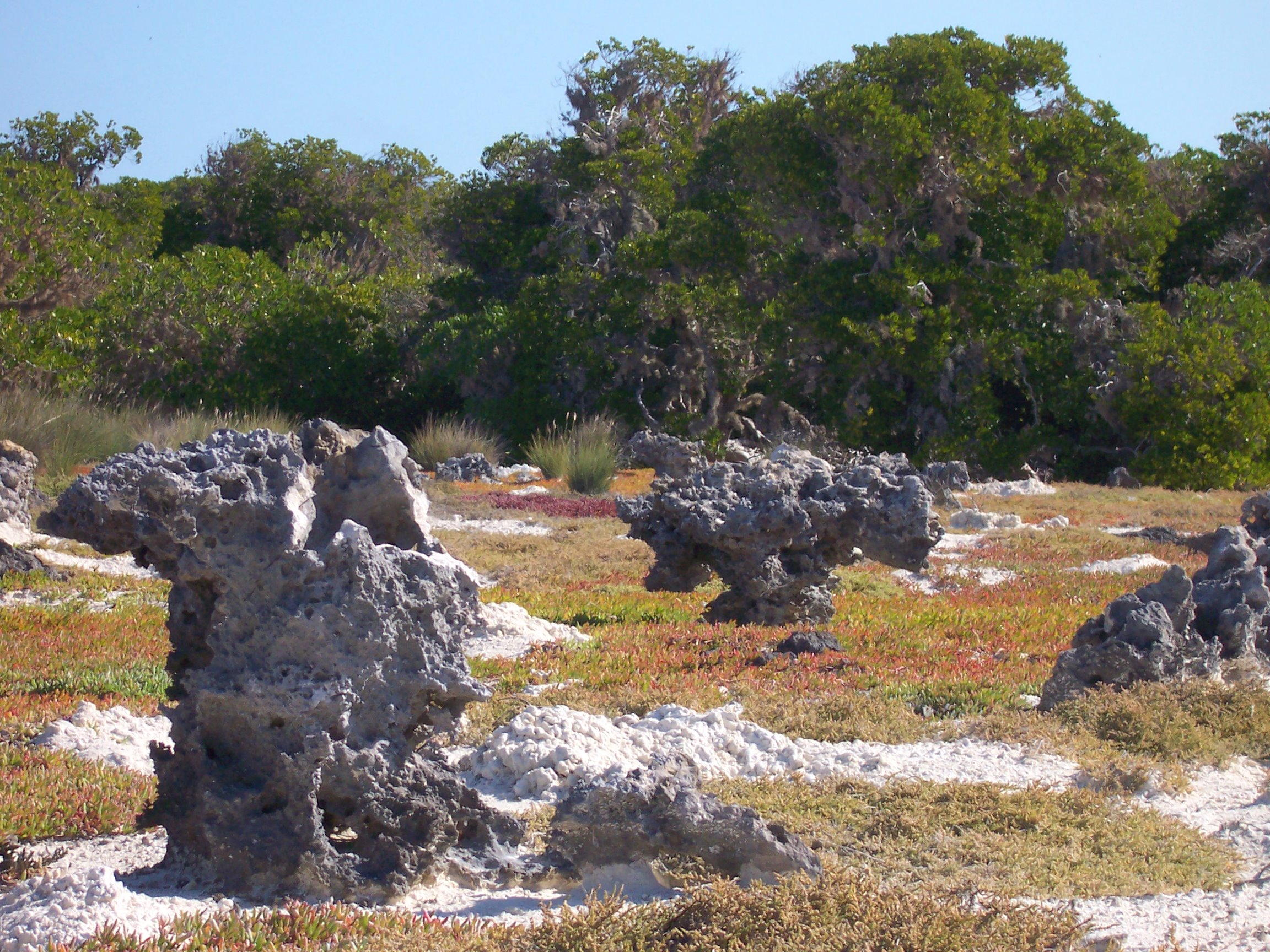
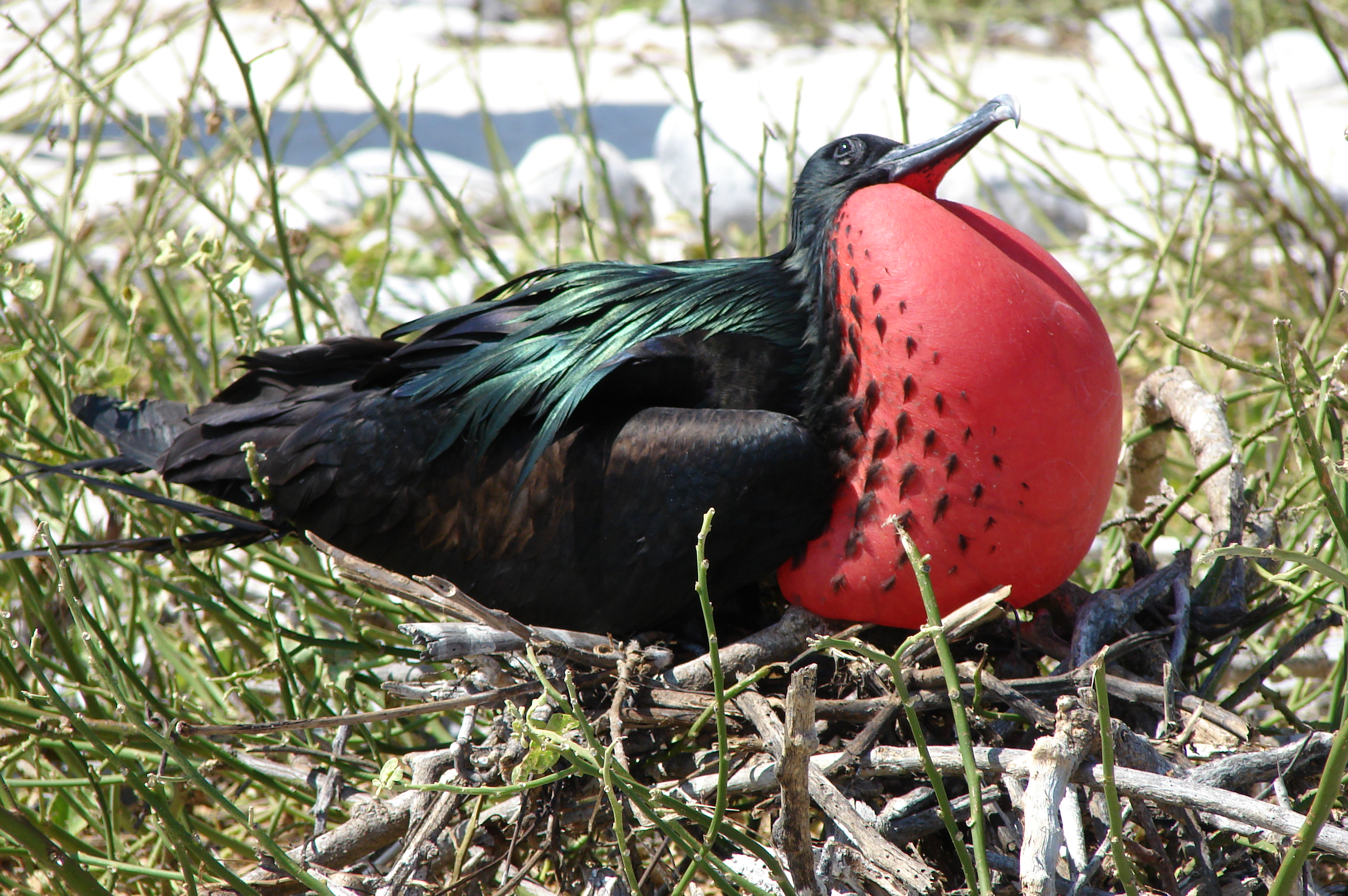
Left: coral "mushrooms". Right: nesting male great frigatebird.

The earliest study of the flora and fauna, and also the geomorphological structure was in 1910. There are 307 species of animals and plants on Aldabra. Reptiles are the prominent terrestrial fauna. Sir David Attenborough called Aldabra "One of the wonders of the world", and it is also known as one of "crown jewels" of the Indian Ocean.

=== Flora ===
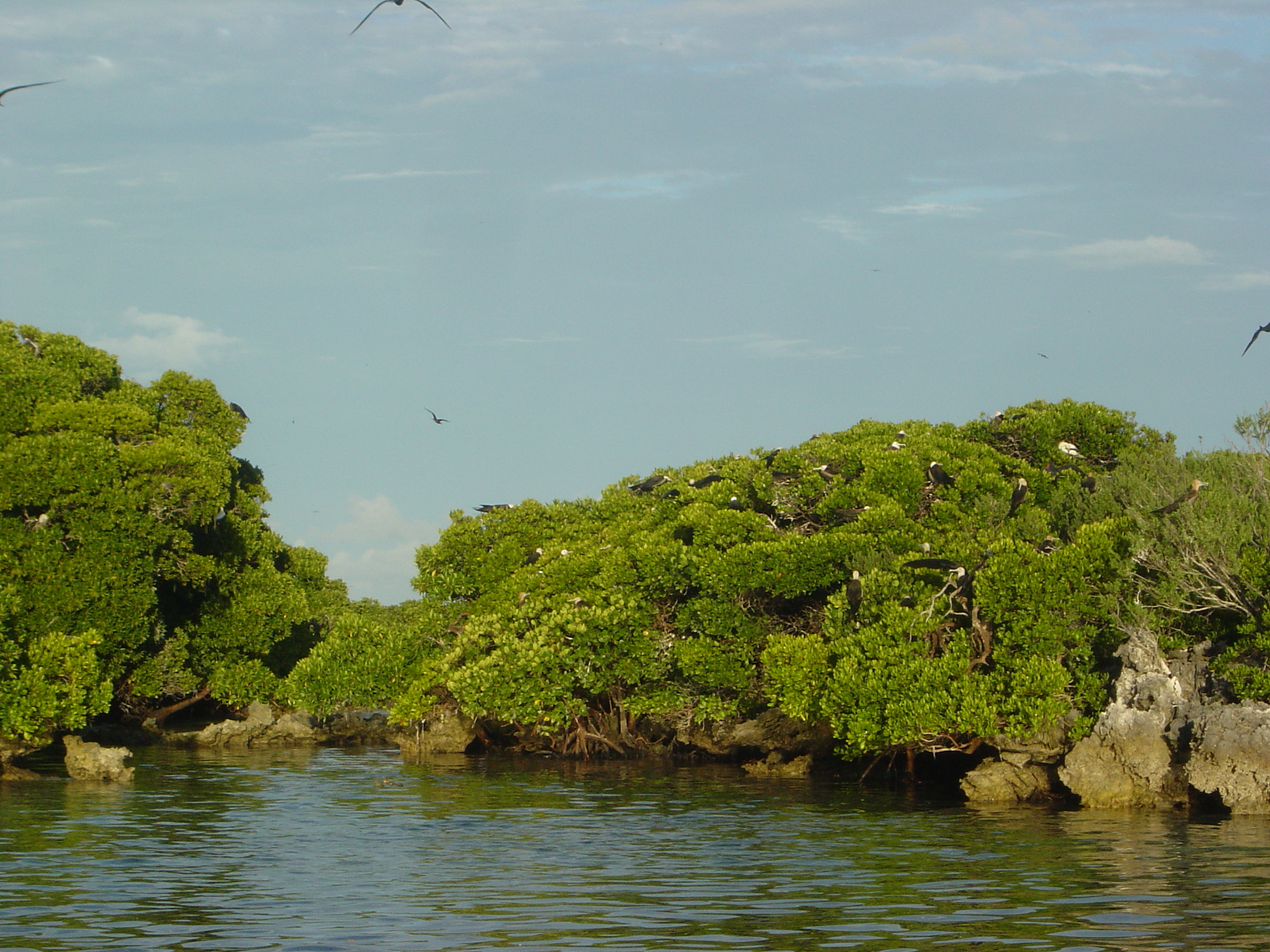
A mangrove in Aldabra Atoll

The higher areas of Aldabra are covered in pemphis, a thick coastal shrub, while the lower areas, home to the giant tortoises, are a mixture of trees, shrubs, herbs and grasses. There have been recorded 273 species of flowering plants, shrubs, and ferns on the atoll. There are dense thickets of Pemphis acidula, and a mixture of grasses and herbs called "tortoise turf" in many areas. This flora includes 19 endemic species and 22 species that are only common to neighboring islands, and several of these species are on the IUCN Red List. The tropicbird orchid (Angraecum seychellarum) is the national flower of Seychelles and is found in the dry craggy limestone champignon of Aldabra. Other endemic plants includes Pandanus aldabrensis, the Aldabra lily (Aloe aldabrensis) and a sub-species of tropicbird orchid, Angraecum eburneum.

The lagoon is bordered by mangrove forests, and has large inland seagrass meadows as well as areas of coral reef and sand flats. The mangroves, which thrive in tidal mudflat areas and saline conditions, are seen on the shores of the lagoon and are integral to the coastal ecosystem. There are seven species of mangrove on Aldabra, three of which are rarely occurring species. These include 'Mangliye blan' or white mangrove (Avicennia marina) which grows to 12 metres (39 ft), Mangliye lat or black mangrove (Bruguiera gymnorhiza) which grows to 18 metres (59 ft) in a conical shape, Mangliye zonn (Ceriops tagal) which grows to 7 metres (23 ft) with a buttressed trunk, and 'Mangliye rouz' or red mangrove (Rhizophora mucronata) which is the tallest species up to 20 metres (66 ft) in height.

=== Fauna ===
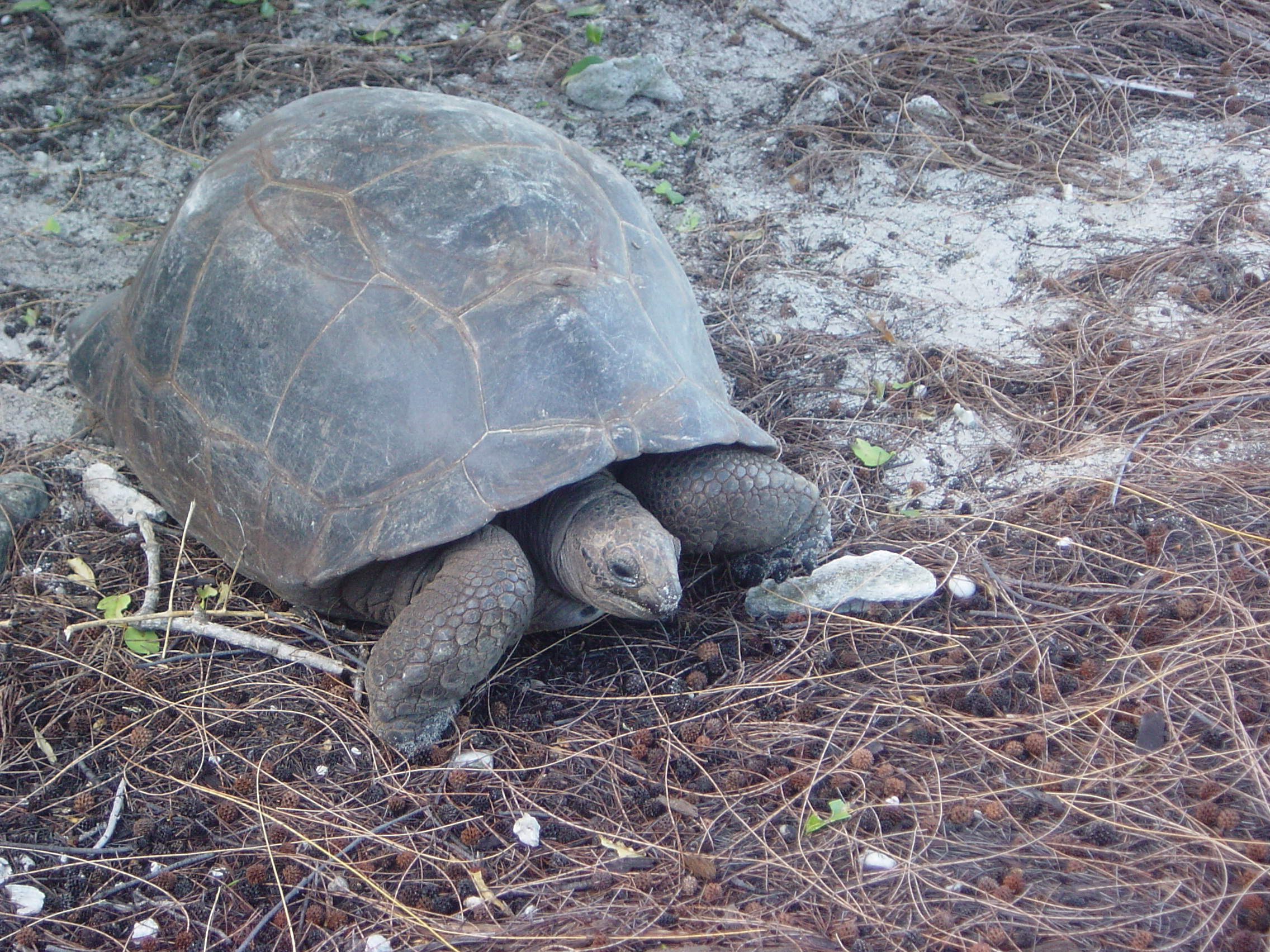
Aldabra giant tortoise

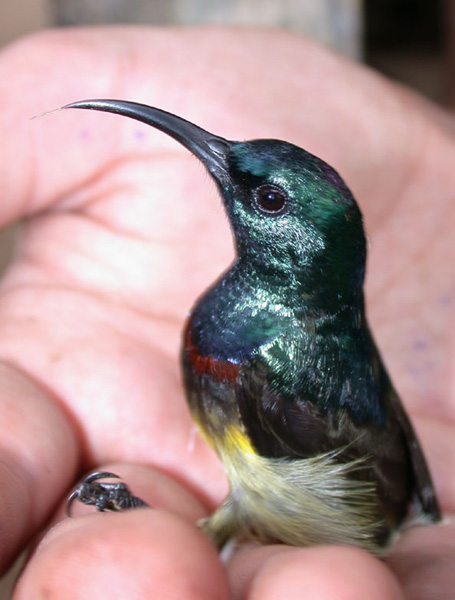
Souimanga sunbird (Cinnyris souimanga)

The atoll has distinctive fauna including the largest population of giant tortoises (Aldabrachelys gigantea) in the world (100,000 animals). Tortoise size varies substantially across the atoll, but adult tortoises typically have a carapace length of 105 centimetres (41 in) and can weigh up to 350 kilograms (770 lb). They are herbivores and feed on plants, trees and algae that grows in the freshwater pools. The tortoises mate between February and May, the females then lay their eggs from June to September in areas with suitable soil layers. They lay eggs the size of golf balls in a clutch of three to five eggs every few years in high-density areas and 14-16 eggs in low-density areas. The females can lay several clutches in a year and the incubation period is 73–160 days. The small vulnerable juveniles are prey to coconut crabs, land crabs, rats and birds. In the past giant tortoises have been relocated to other islands in Seychelles and also to Victoria Botanical Gardens in Mahé. One of the longest-lived Aldabra giant tortoises was Adwaita, a male who died at the age of about 250 years at Kolkata's Alipore Zoological Gardens on 24 March 2006.

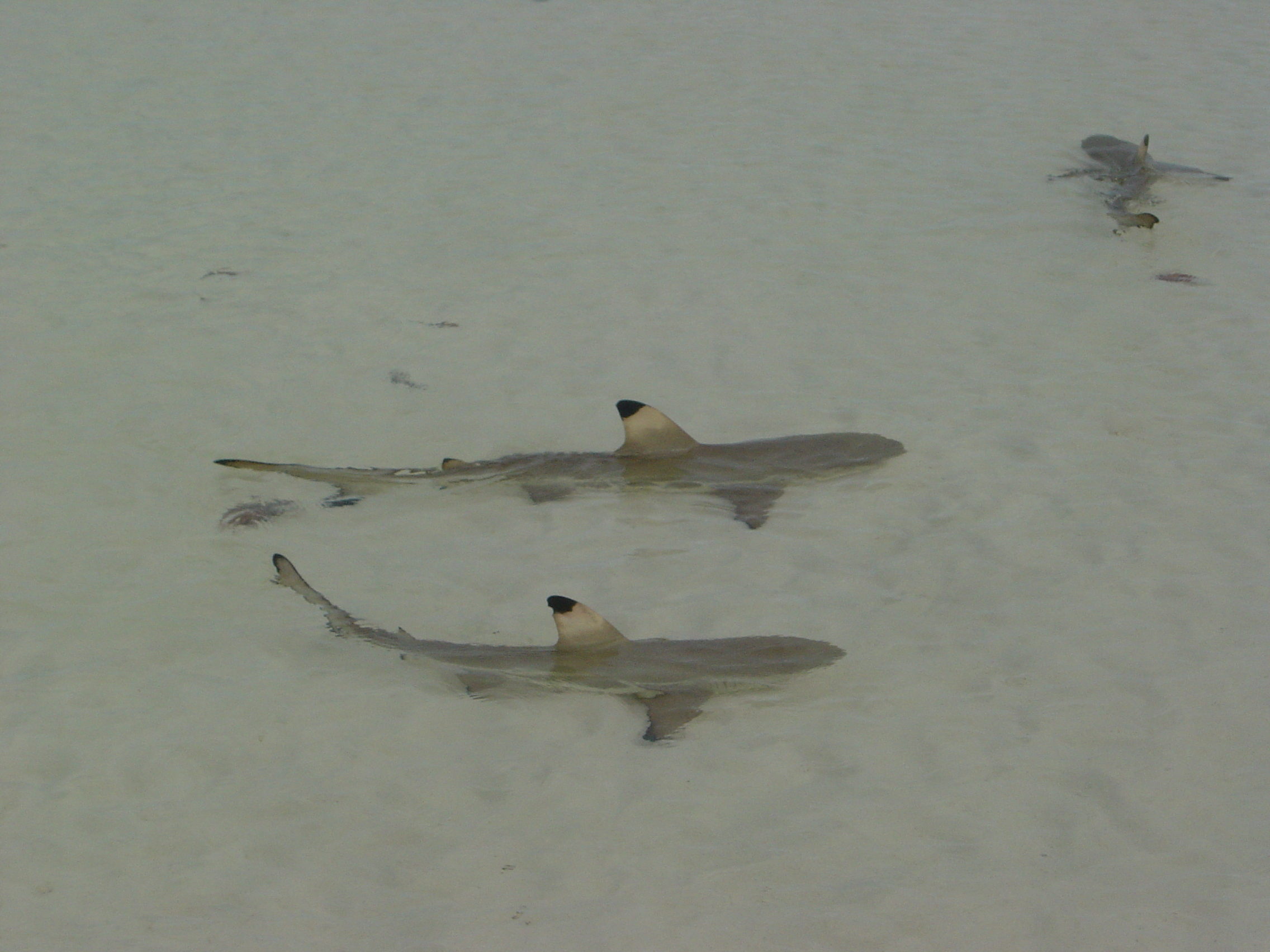
Blacktip reef sharks (Carcharhinus melanopterus)

Aldabra is a breeding ground for the hawksbill sea turtle (Eretmochelys imbricata) and green sea turtle (Chelonia mydas). Aldabra has one of the largest populations of nesting green turtles in the Western Indian Ocean. Aldabra has a large population of the world's largest terrestrial arthropod, the coconut crab (Birgus latro); and hosts the white-throated rail, the only surviving flightless rail species in the Indian Ocean. Sharks, manta rays, and barracuda populate the seas surrounding the island. During the Pleistocene the dominant land predator was the crocodilian Aldabrachampsus which is now extinct. Three extant species of lizards occur, the skink Cryptoblepharus boutonii and the geckos Phelsuma abbotti and Hemidactylus mercatorius. Pleistocene fossils also indicate the former presence of an Oplurus iguana and other skink and gecko species. There are three endemic species of bat from Aldabra: Paratriaenops pauliani, Chaerephon pusilla and the Aldabra flying fox (Pteropus aldabrensis), as well as the more widely distributed Mauritian tomb bat (Taphozous mauritianus). There are 1,000 species of insects, many of them endemic. Many species of butterflies also flutter around Aldabra.

Endemic birds include the Aldabra drongo (Dicrurus aldabranus), the Aldabran subspecies of the white-throated rail (Dryolimnas cuvieri aldabranus), the last surviving flightless bird of the Indian Ocean region, and the endemic Aldabra fody (Foudia aldabrana), The islands are important breeding grounds for thousands of seabirds, including several species of tern, red-tailed tropicbirds, white-tailed tropicbirds, red-footed boobies, and the world's second largest breeding populations of great and lesser frigate birds. The bird fauna is most similar to Madagascar or Comoros and other birds found here include greater flamingos, the Malagasy pond heron, Comoros blue pigeon, Malagasy kestrel, Malagasy coucal, Madagascar nightjar, Malagasy bulbul and souimanga sunbird.

At least 13 species of cetaceans, including dolphins, orcas, and especially humpback whales, have been identified in the waters. Dugongs, thought to be regionally extinct in the 18th century, have been confirmed multiple times in recent years.

== Conservation ==
Conservationists feared a major threat to the atoll's biodiversity in the 1960s when, as part of the British Indian Ocean Territory, the British made plans to set up a military establishment on the atoll. Due to national and international opposition this plan was cancelled in 1967. This incident became known as the Aldabra Affair in England.

Invasive alien species such as rats, cats and goats that were introduced in the past threaten the native biodiversity of the atoll. Goats were eradicated from the atoll in 2012 after a long-term eradication program. Cats have been removed from all of the islands except Grande Terre Island, which allowed for the reintroduction of the Aldabra rail to Picard Island. Research into a feasibility study to eradicate rats from the atoll has been undertaken.

Until recently, Aldabra had remained free of invasive birds. However, the Madagascar fody (Foudia madagascariensis) has spread to Aldabra after being introduced to Assumption Island. An eradication program for this bird on both Assumption and Aldabra is almost complete. Due to the limited space of its habitat, extreme weather conditions, epidemic and limited range could also pose serious threats to the entire ecology of the atoll.

Aldabra also accumulates large amounts of plastic pollution on its coastline and, despite a major clean-up effort in 2019, over 500 tonnes is thought to remain on the atoll, with significant impacts on wildlife. Most of this pollution originates from the regional fishing industry, although a significant proportion is also transported from southeast Asia through ocean currents.

The coral reefs at Aldabra were severely affected by the 2016 El Niño event. Although thermal stress was not exceptionally high (less than 4 Degree Heating Weeks), hard coral cover on Aldabra's seaward-facing reefs was reduced by over 50% (35% in the lagoon), and soft coral cover fell by over 90%. Fortunately, there are some signs of recovery, as the abundance of juvenile corals has since increased significantly, particularly within the lagoon, although Aldabra's reefs of course remain critically threatened by climate change.

== Protection ==
Aldabra atoll was designated a UNESCO World Heritage Site on 19 November 1982. It is one of the two UNESCO World Heritage Sites in the Seychelles;, and is managed by the Seychelles Islands Foundation (SIF). The marine protected area extends 1 kilometre (0.62 mi) into the sea to ensure preservation of its marine fauna. Eco tourism is controlled and introduction of invasive species is restricted.

Based on the evaluation process, UNESCO inscribed the site, a legally protected special reserve of 35,000 hectares (86,000 acres), on the list of World Heritage Sites under three criteria: Criterion (vii): Aldabra Atoll encompasses a large expanse of relatively untouched natural beauty where a number of important animal species and some plant species thrive, along with remarkable land formations, and its process provides a unique spectacle of natural phenomena; Criterion (ix): The atoll is a superlative example of an oceanic island ecosystem in which evolutionary processes are active within a rich biota. The size and morphological diversity of the atoll has permitted the development of a variety of discrete insular communities with a high incidence of endemicity among the constituent species that are typical of island ecosystems. The natural processes take place with minimal human interference and can be clearly demonstrated in their full complexity; and Criterion (x): Aldabra provides a natural laboratory for the study of the process of evolutionary ecology and is a platform for key scientific discovery. The atoll constitutes a refuge harboring viable populations of a range of rare and endangered species of plants and animals, including the last giant tortoise and flightless bird populations of the Western Indian Ocean, a substantial marine turtle breeding population, and large seabird colonies which number in the tens of thousands. The substantial tortoise population is self-sustaining and all the elements of its inter-relationship with the terrestrial environment are evident.

BirdLife International declared Aldabra as an Important Endemic Bird Area (IBA) in 2001 due to its large seabird colonies under categories A1, A2, A4i, A4ii and A4iii, covering an area of 33,180 hectares (82,000 acres) overlapping with the special reserve area of 35,000 hectares (86,000 acres) of Aldabra Atoll.

Aldabra became a Ramsar Convention Wetland Site of International Importance in 2010. Covering 25,100 ha (over half the area of the whole atoll) the wetland ecosystem of Aldabra includes the extensive shallow lagoon inside the atoll, which is carpeted with lush seagrass beds and patchy coral reefs, the intertidal mud flats, the coral reefs outside the lagoon, freshwater pools, beaches, and 2000 ha of mangrove stands. These wetlands support several endangered species including the increasing number of turtles at the atoll, dugongs and many other bird, fish and invertebrate species.

Aldabra was designated as a site under the Indian Ocean South East Asia (IOSEA) turtle network, in their 2014 convention.

== Demography ==
A small scientific research station of the SIF is based in La Gigi village on Picard Island. The permanent staff (currently 12) conduct research to study Aldabra's biodiversity.

== Transport ==
Aldabra is not easily accessed. No airstrips, helipads or landing jetties have been permitted on the atoll. The nearest airfield is on Assumption 50 kilometres (31 mi) south-east of Picard Island. Bi-annual supply ships operating from Mahé provide essentials to the research station.

== Tourism ==
Cruises are operated by several companies along with dive boats which may visit the atoll on expedition tours. Visits to the island by people other than the scientists and staff of the SIF are strictly controlled and only guided tours are provided with prior permission. As of 2012, a yearly average of 900 tourists visit the atoll. Within the atoll, paved walking paths exist from the village of La Gigi, which leads to a promontory from where scenic views of the large lagoon (during low tides) and the mangrove species are seen.

== Bibliography ==
- Coe, Malcolm James (1998). A Fragile Eden: Portraits of the Endemic Flowering Plants of the Granitic Seychelles. Princeton University Press. pp. 11–. ISBN 978-0-691-04817-8.
- Mair, Lyn; Beckley, Lynnath (2012). Seychelles. Bradt Travel Guides. pp. 126–. ISBN 978-1-84162-406-8.
- Swingland, Ian Richard; Klemens, Michael W. (1989). The Conservation Biology of Tortoises. IUCN. pp. 105–. ISBN 978-2-88032-986-0.
