= Soeur =

Soeur or Sœur (French, 'sister'), or variants, may refer to:

- Sœur system, a fictional element from the Japanese media franchise Maria-sama ga Miteru (Marimite)
- Île des Sœurs, or Nuns' Island, part of Montreal, Quebec, Canada
- Îles Sœurs, Seychelles (Soeurs Islands), an island group:
  - Grande Soeur, Seychelles
  - Petite Soeur, Seychelles

== See also ==
- Sister (disambiguation)
- Sour (disambiguation)
- Île des Sœurs (disambiguation)
- Petite soeur (disambiguation)
- Demi-soeur, a film
- Les Belles-sœurs, a play
- "Ma sœur" ('My Sister'), a 2007 song by Vitaa
- Nun, a member of a religious community of women
- Seur, a place in France
