= Île des Sœurs (disambiguation) =

Île des Sœurs (lit. 'Island of Sisters') may refer to:

== Canada ==
Several Quebec islands are named Île des Sœurs (lit., "nuns' island").

- Nuns' Island, an island in the Saint Lawrence River, part of the city of Montreal
- Île des Sœurs (Salaberry-de-Valleyfield), a former island in the Saint Lawrence River now linked to Île Papineau in Salaberry-de-Valleyfield, Quebec
- Île des Sœurs (Sherbrooke), located in Sherbrooke, Quebec
- Île des Sœurs (Saint-Anicet), located in Saint-Anicet, Quebec
- Île des Sœurs (Duhamel-Ouest), located in Duhamel-Ouest, Quebec

== See also ==
- Iles Soeurs, Seychelles (Souers Islands), an island group:
  - Grande Soeur, Seychelles
  - Petite Soeur, Seychelles
- Soeur (disambiguation)
