= L'Union Estate =

Coconut and vanilla plantation in Seychelles

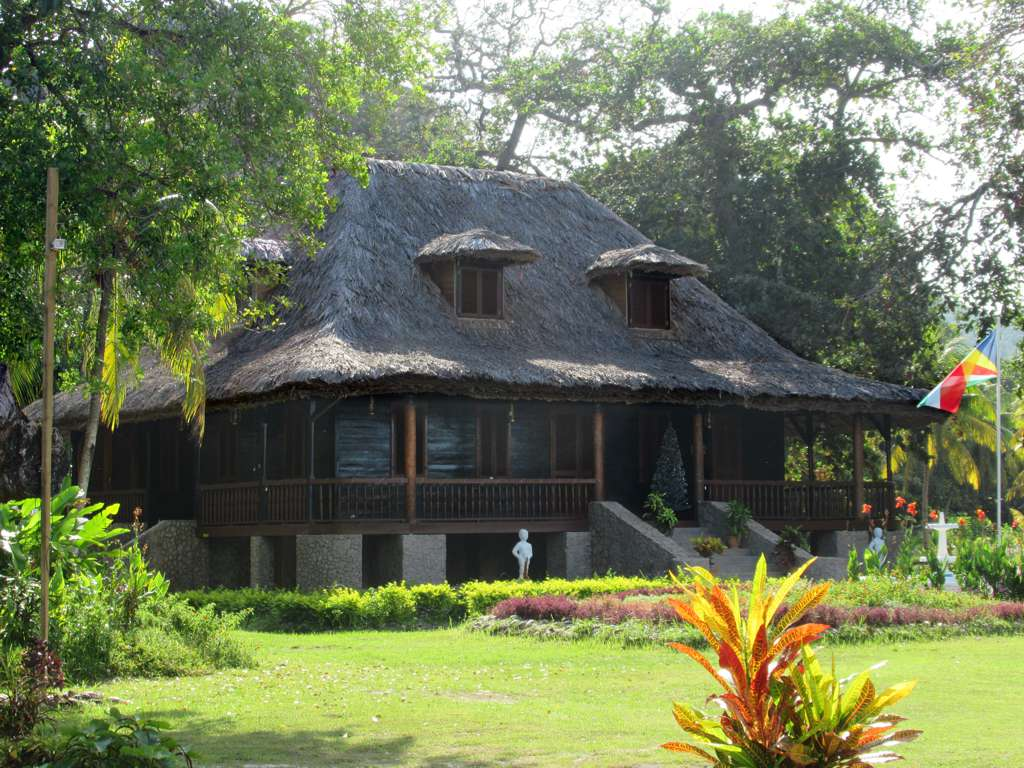
- The colonial plantation house at L'Union Estate, December 2016

- Location within Seychelles
- Type: National Heritage Site
- Location: La Digue, Seychelles
- Coordinates: 4.363146182322249°S 55.825615826497966°E
- Area: 741.316 acres (300.000 ha)
- Operator: L'Union Estate Company Limited
- Visitors: 15,000 per month (2026)

L'Union Estate is an 18th-century coconut and vanilla plantation in the island of La Digue, Seychelles.

== History ==
The estate was originally established as a 300-hectare plantation during the 18th century, growing coconuts for copra and oil, vanilla, and other tropical crops. It later included the Plantation House (locally known as Grann Kaz), an example of French colonial architecture in the Seychelles, which was built with hardwood and a thatched roof and served as the residence of the Rasool and Hossein families. Coconut processing continued until the 1980s using traditional ox-driven mills, and vanilla cultivation required hand pollination due to the absence of natural pollinators. The estate later became the holiday home of former President of Seychelles France-Albert René.

By the 2010s, L'Union Estate had been preserved as a national monument and tourist site. It includes restored buildings, a cemetery with early settlers' graves, a copra kiln, vanilla plantations, giant tortoises, and access to Anse Source d'Argent. In 2017, the government introduced a scheme to share estate ownership with La Digue residents, retaining 51% and selling 49% to locals. In 2022, the estate became part of an initiative to supply fresh produce and meat to residents and tourist establishments.

== In media ==
The estate and its plantation house were used as a filming location for the 1977 French film Goodbye Emmanuelle.

== Map ==
1 L'Union Estate Entry/Exit
2 L'Union Estate's Old Cemetery
3 The Plantation House
4 Vanilla Plantation
5 Anse Source d'Argent
6 Fresh Produce and Pig Farm
