= Sour (disambiguation) =

To be sour is to evoke the taste that detects acidity.

Sour may also refer to:

- Sour (surname), a surname

== Food and drink ==
- Sour (cocktail), a traditional family of mixed drinks
- Souring, a cooking technique that uses exposure to an acid to effect a physical and chemical change in food
- Sour beer

== Music ==
- Sour (album), a 2021 album by Olivia Rodrigo
- Sour (band), an American band
- Sour, a 1994 album by Ours
- "Sour", a song by Limp Bizkit from their album Three Dollar Bill, Y'all

== Places ==
- Sours, a commune in northern France
- Sour, Algeria
- Tyre, Lebanon, occasionally romanized as Sour

== Other ==
- Sun of Unclouded Righteousness, a Christian hymn
- Sour (cannabis), a subset of Cannabis sativa-dominant Cannabis strains
- Sour (oil), petroleum with a high sulfur content

== See also ==
- Soeur (disambiguation), including Sœur and Söur
- Sur (disambiguation)
- Tart (disambiguation)
