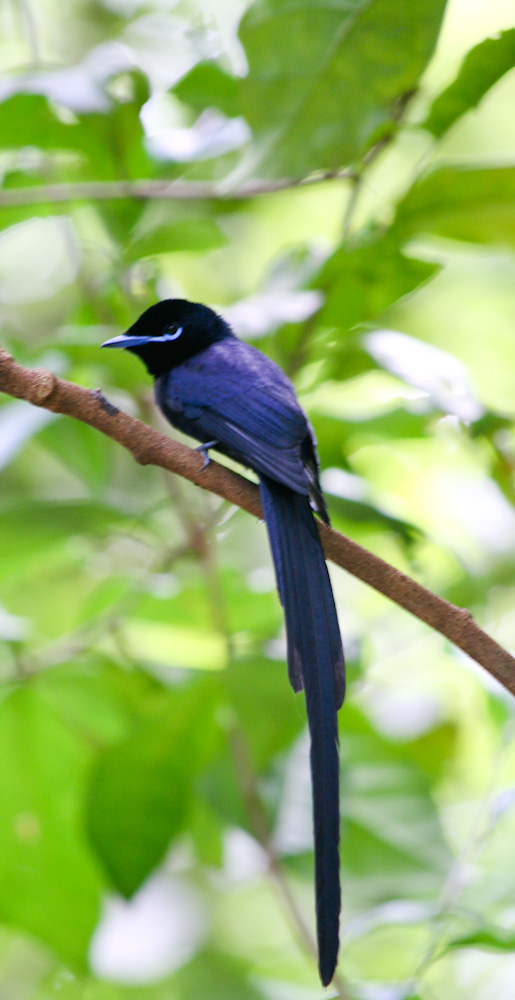

Conservation status
- Vulnerable (IUCN 3.1)

Scientific classification
- Kingdom: Animalia
- Phylum: Chordata
- Class: Aves
- Order: Passeriformes
- Family: Monarchidae
- Genus: Terpsiphone
- Species: T. corvina

Binomial name
- Terpsiphone corvina (E. Newton, 1867)

Synonyms
- Tchitrea corvina

= Seychelles paradise flycatcher =

Species of bird

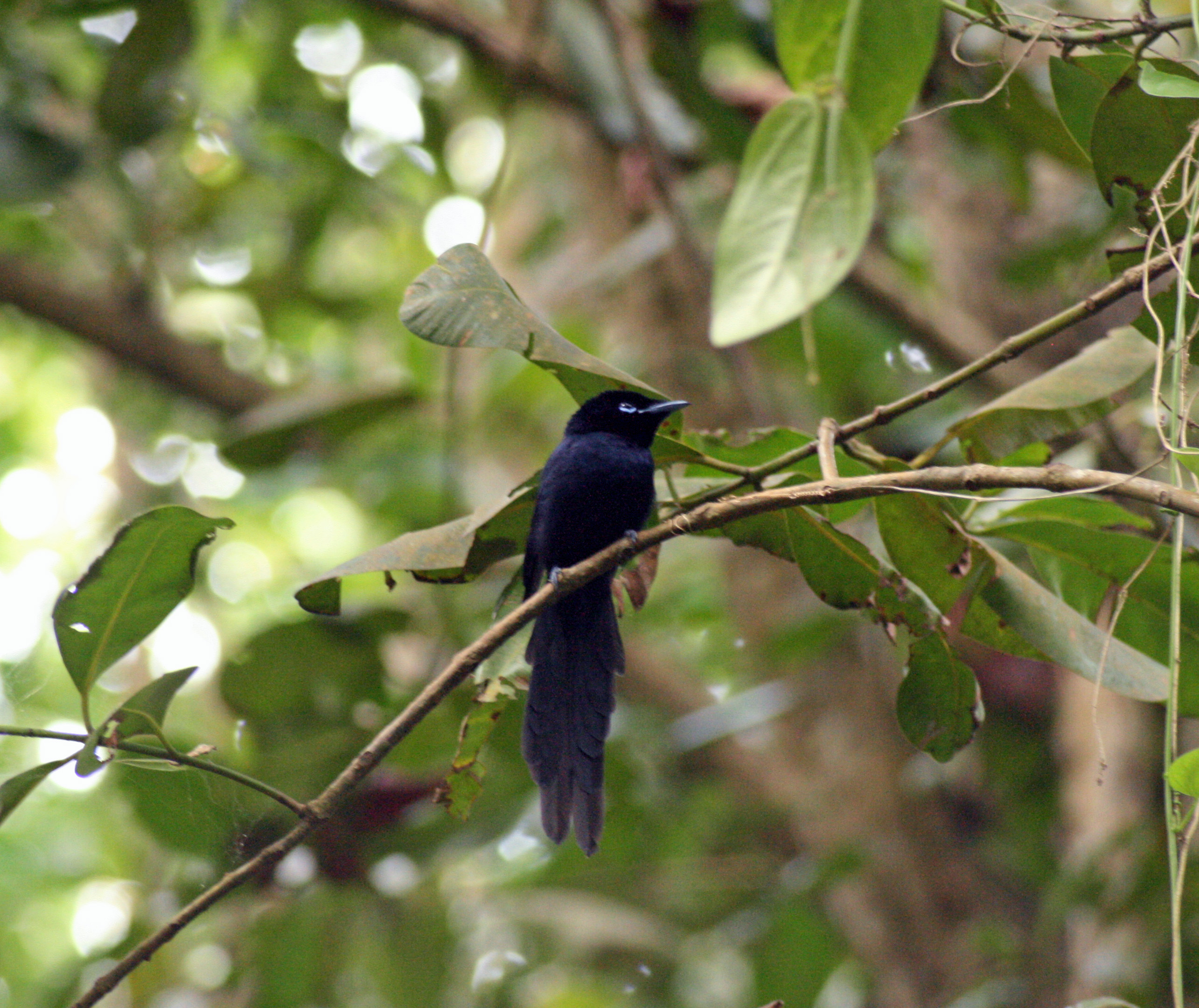
Male on La Digue

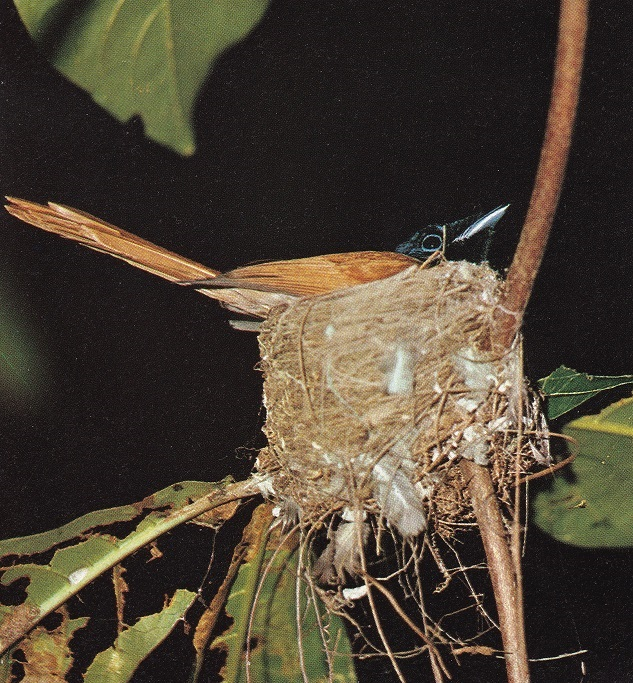
Nesting female

The Seychelles paradise flycatcher (Terpsiphone corvina) is a rare bird from the genus of paradise flycatchers (Terpsiphone) within the family Monarchidae. It is a forest-dwelling bird endemic to the Seychelles where it is native to the island of La Digue. Males have glossy black plumage with elongated tail feathers, while females are reddish-brown with pale underparts and no long tail feathers. The International Union for Conservation of Nature lists this bird as being "Vulnerable" and attempts have been made to increase its numbers by relocating some individuals to Denis Island, another island in the Seychelles archipelago.

== Taxonomy and systematics ==
An alternate common name for the Seychelles paradise flycatcher is the Seychelles black paradise-flycatcher.

== Description ==
The length of the males is about 20 cm. In addition there are two long black central tail feathers which can reach a length of 30 cm. The females can reach a length between 16 and 18 cm (including the tail). The males are entirely glossy black with a deep blue sheen. The upperparts of the females including wings and tail are reddish brown. The underparts are pale cream white. Facial skin, bill, and legs are blue.

== Distribution ==
It lives in the Veuve Nature Reserve on La Digue, Seychelles, where it inhabits dense Calophyllum forests. Although a reservation was made especially for this bird, it is common to see it outside in the trees or even in the garden of the Seychellois people. Plans were made to get this bird back into the wild on other islands of the Seychelles.

== Ecology ==
It preys on insects in flight or from a perch. It also feeds on larvae and spiders. The oval bowl-shaped nest is built on branches and consists of twigs, palm fibre, and spider webs. Both parents, male and female, take care of the little bird until it grows up and each of them provides it with food, mainly in the form of flies for which it got its name.

== Relationship to humans ==
In 2019, Air Seychelles named its new A320neo Veuve, a reference to the bird's habitat, in honour of the Seychelles paradise flycatcher.

== Conservation status ==
The International Union for Conservation of Nature lists this bird as being "Vulnerable". The threats it faces are a result of its specific habitat requirements which are incompatible with the habitat loss and fragmentation taking place on La Digue, due to increasing tourism and the expansion of settlements. Numbers of birds are thought to be in the low hundreds, and in an effort to improve its long-term hopes of survival, it has been introduced to Denis Island where there are no mammalian predators. 23 birds were moved to Denis Island in 2008 and have since successfully bred there.

The genetic load of a small population can increase through accumulation of mildly deleterious mutations. The genomic diversity of T. corvina before and after the population decline was compared by whole-genome DNA sequencing of museum-preserved (over 130 years old) and modern samples. Due to the long-term small effective population, the ancestral population had a low masked genetic load. This effect favored less inbreeding depression that allowed them to avoid extinction and successfully recover. Together with the substantial loss of genetic diversity, the population size probably reduced the adaptive potential and jeopardized long-term viability when the species faces environmental change.
