= Sour (surname) =

Sour is a surname. Notable people with the surname include:

- Art Sour (1924 – 2000), petroleum and real estate businessman
- Hilda Sour (1915 – 2003), Chilean actress and singer
- Robert Sour (1905 – 1985), lyricist and composer, and the president of Broadcast Music Incorporated

== See also ==
- Sour (disambiguation)
- Sou (surname)
