= Anse Source d'Argent =

Beach in La Digue island, Seychelles

Coordinates: 4.371544°S 55.827213°E

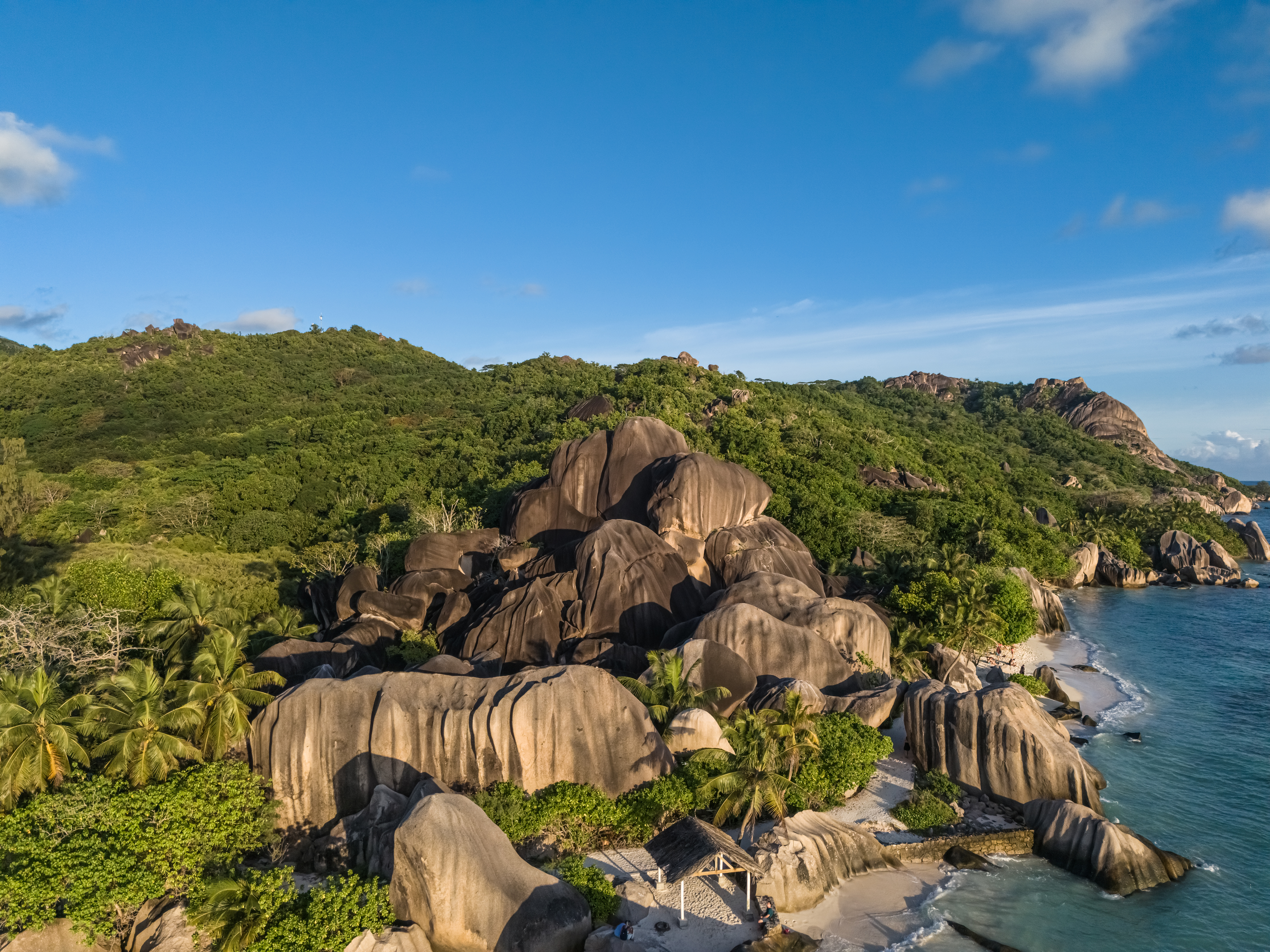
- Anse Source d'Argent, aerial view Anse Source d'Argent, aerial view
- Location: La Digue, Seychelles
- Coast: Indian Ocean
- Type: Rural, natural sandy beach
- Demarcated: 1997; 29 years ago
- Total length: 2 km (1.2 mi)
- Maximum width: 20 m (66 ft)
- Orientation: Southwest
- Governing authority: Seychelles National Parks Authority

Anse Source d'Argent is a beach situated in the southwest coast of La Digue, Seychelles. It is listed in Lonely Planet as one of the world's best beaches in 2024.

== Location ==
The beach is located within the L'Union Estate, a historic coconut plantation and vanilla farm that now serves as a nature reserve. Access to Anse Source d'Argent requires a small entrance fee to estate.

The beach is often considered the world's most photographed, because of its massive boulders as "reminiscent of prehistoric times."

== In media ==
- In 2023, Forbes India ranked it 2nd among the top 5 best beaches in the world.
- In 2017, CNN ranked it 7th among the top 25 beaches in Africa.
- In 2016, Newsweek listed it as one of the World's best beaches.
