= Grande Soeur =

Island in the Seychelles

Grande Soeur Island
Nickname: Big Sister Island
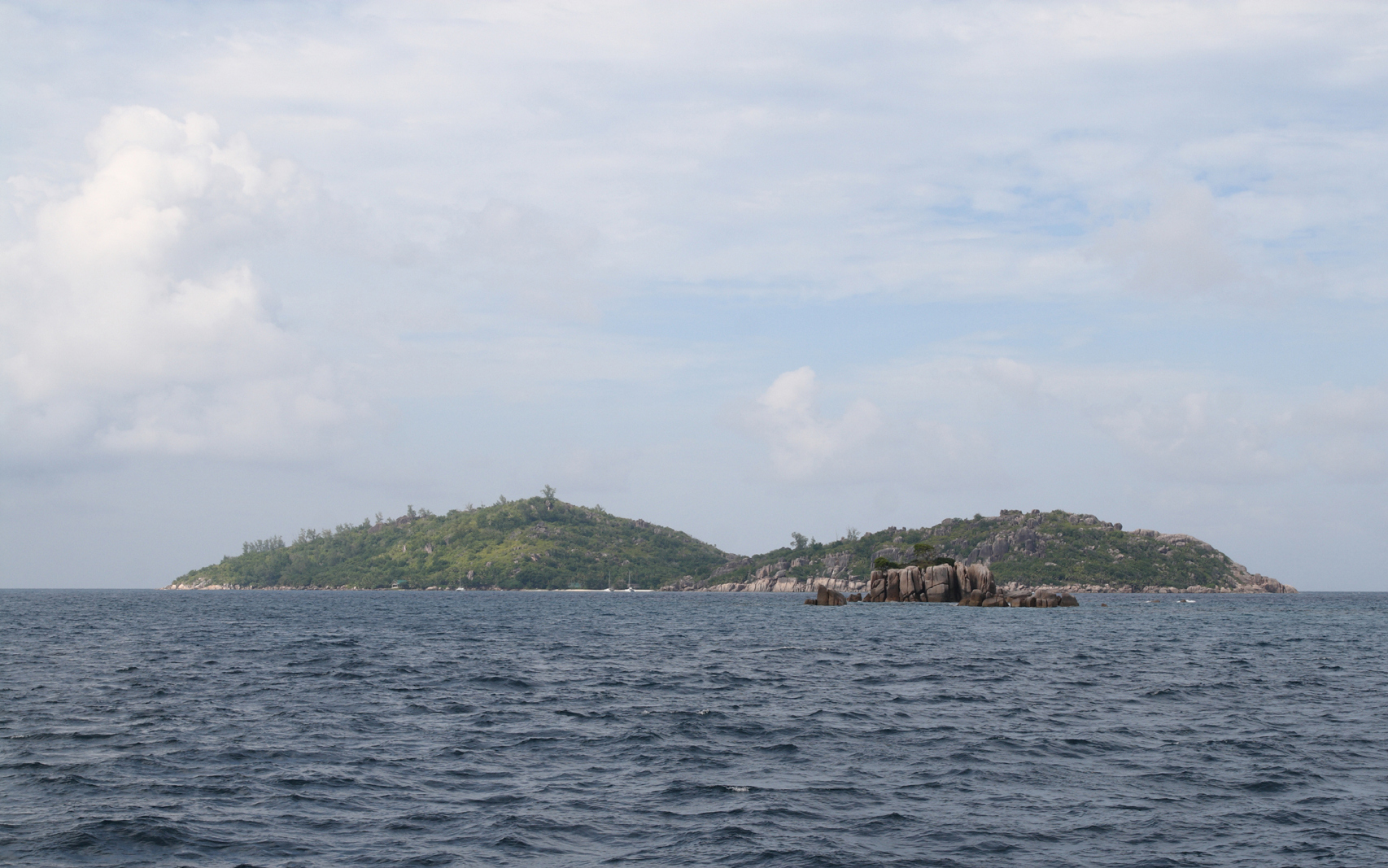

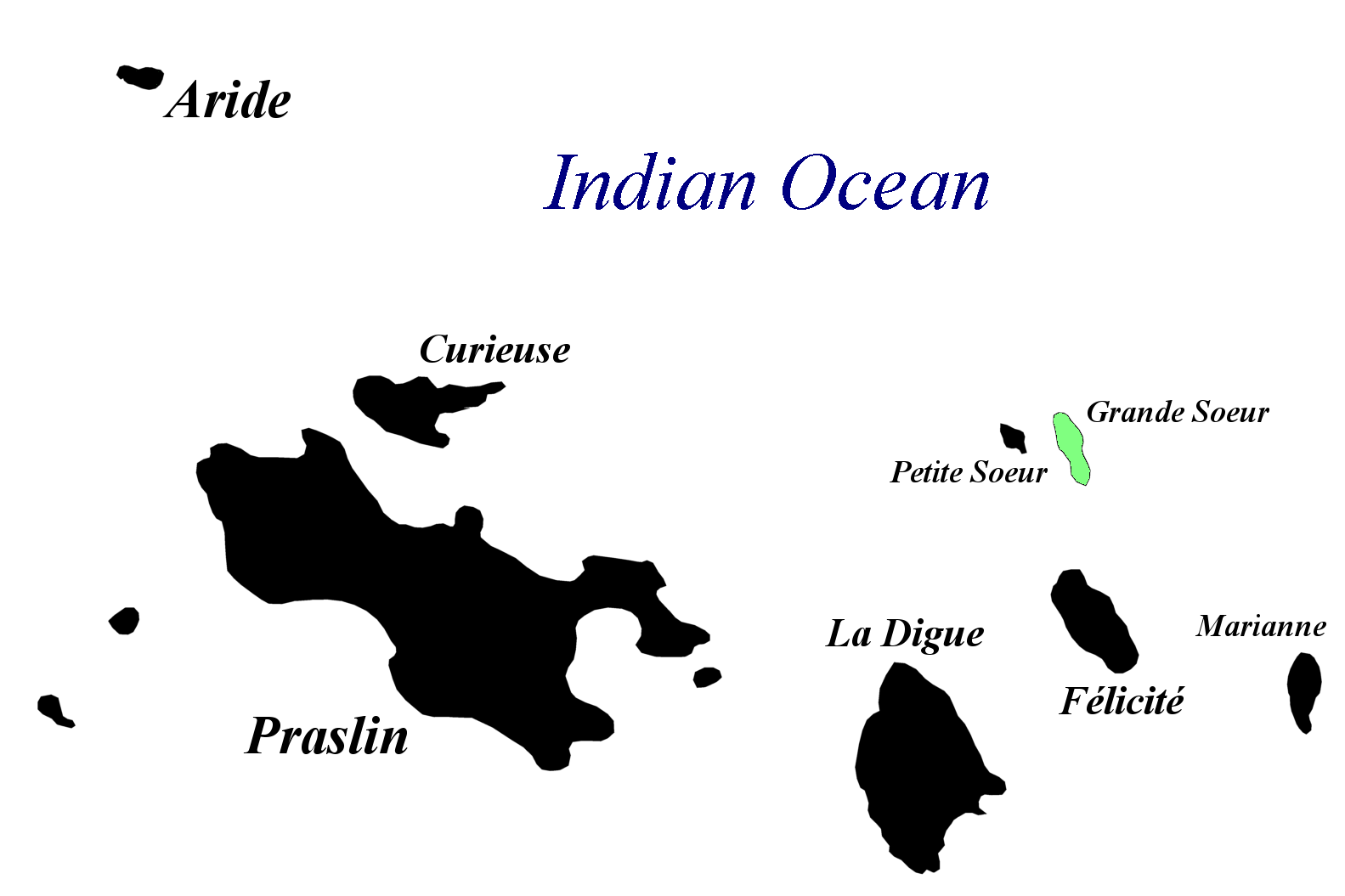

- Location of Grande Soeur Island in Seychelles

Geography
- Location: Seychelles
- Coordinates: 04°17′13″S 55°52′13″E
- Archipelago: Inner Islands, Seychelles
- Adjacent to: Indian Ocean
- Total islands: 1
- Major islands: Grande Soeur Island
- Area: 0.78 km^{2} (0.30 sq mi)
- Length: 1.65 km (1.025 mi)
- Width: 0.6 km (0.37 mi)
- Coastline: 4.79 km (2.976 mi)
- Highest elevation: 113 m (371 ft)
- Highest point: Morne Soeur

Administration
- Seychelles
- Group: Inner Islands
- Sub-Group: Iles Soeurs
- Districts: La Digue and Inner Islands
- Largest settlement: Grande Soeur (pop. 2)

Demographics
- Population: 2 (2014)
- Pop. density: 2.56/km^{2} (6.63/sq mi)
- Ethnic groups: Creole, French, East Africans, Indians.

Additional information
- Time zone: SCT (UTC+4)
- ISO code: SC-15
- Official website: www.seychelles.travel/en/discover/the-islands/

Grande Soeur Island, also called Big Sister, East Sister, is an island in the Seychelles archipelago, Located north of La Digue. It is part of Iles Soeurs with Petite Soeur. It is a granitic island covered with tropical forests. The island is privately owned.

== History ==
In the 20th century there was a small coconut plantation on the island. in 2005 the island, which was privately owned, was bought by hotel Château de Feuilles from Praslin Island. It is visited by their guests, especially for diving. recently the hotel have built a platform for helicopters, and several villas for overnight stay with a staff house.

== Gallery ==
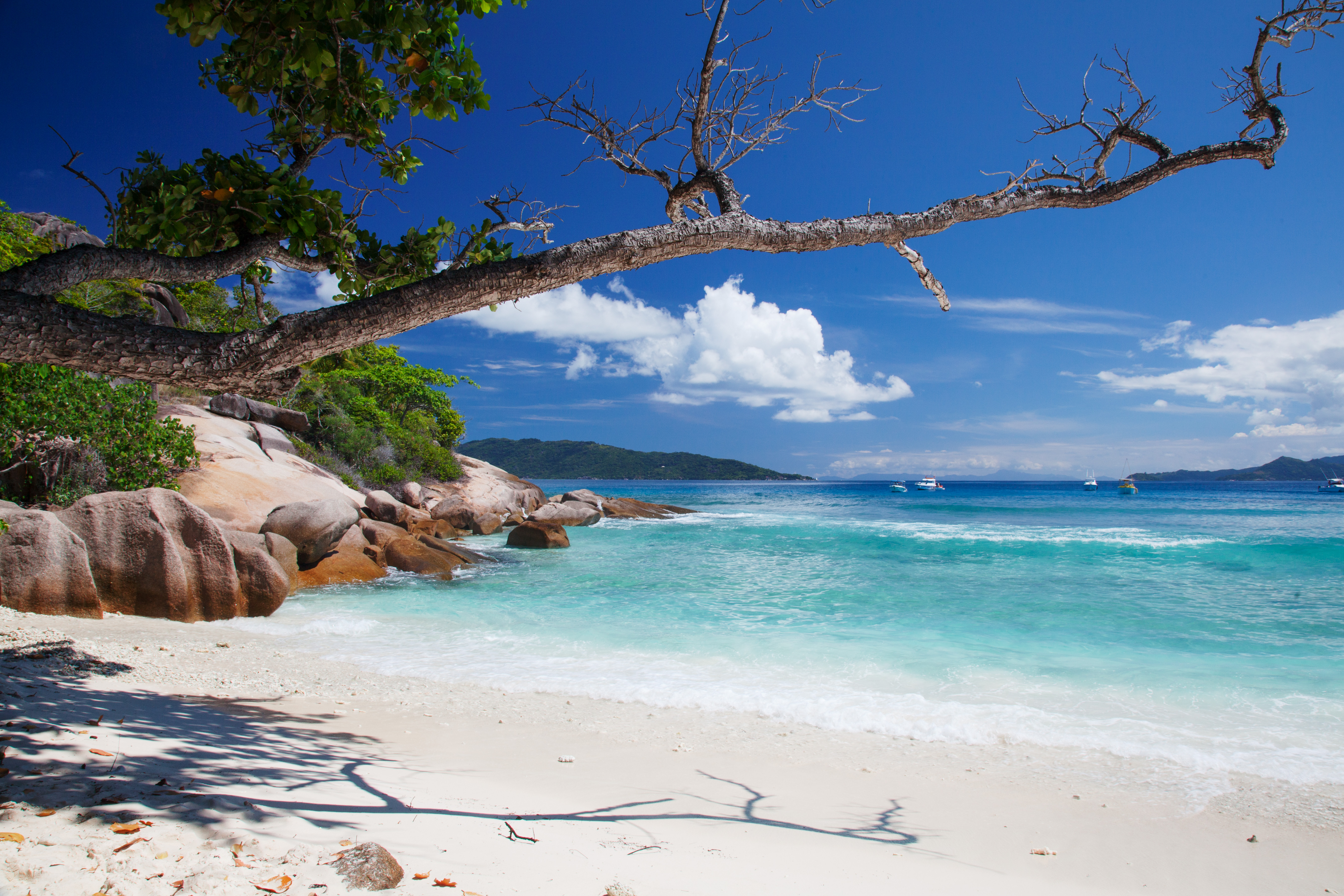

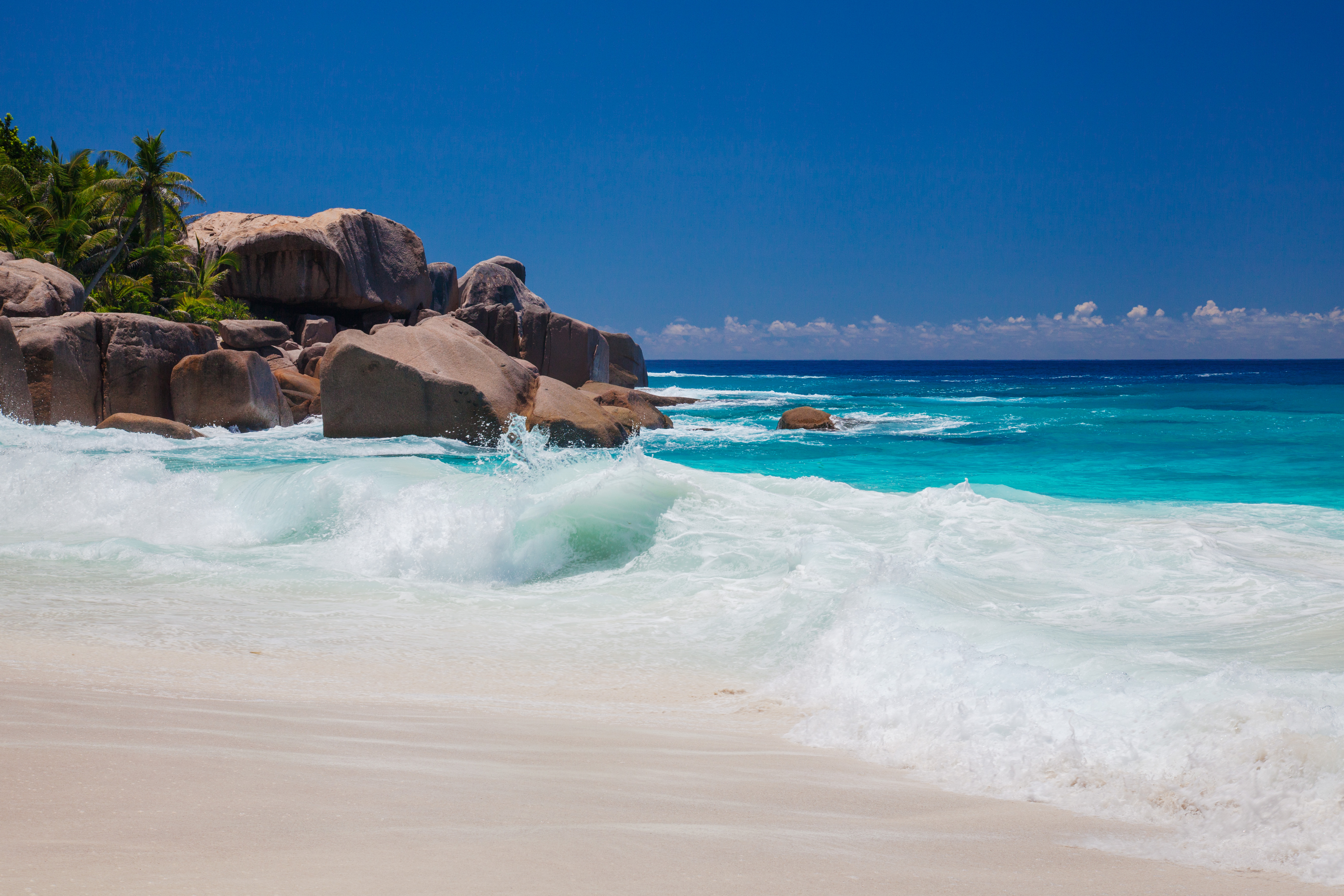
White sand beach on the East Coast.

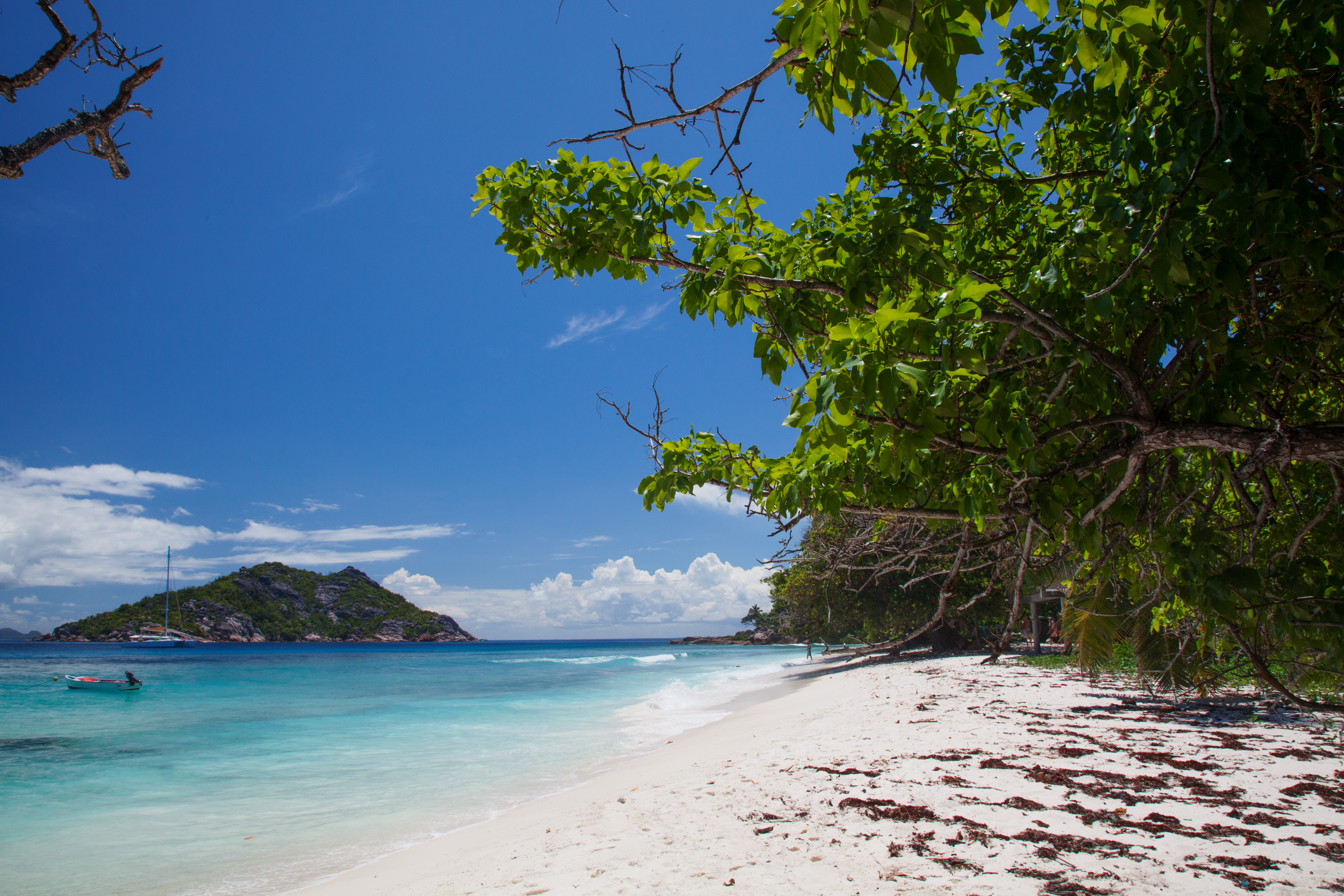
Beach on the west coast, overlooking Petite Soeur.
