= Sour (band) =

American industrial metal band

SöuR
- Origin: Los Angeles, California, U.S.
- Genres: Industrial metal, synth-metal, nu metal
- Years active: 1996–2007
- Label: Grey Goo Transmissions
- Past members: Sativa Novak; Clint Yeager; DD Ehrlich; Tom Curry; Dev Gilmore; Rob Wood; Brett Kerr; Wade Murff

SöuR was an industrial metal band from Los Angeles formed in 1996. The lineup consisted of Sativa Novak on vocals and keyboards, Clint Yeager on bass, DD Ehrlich on guitars, and Tom Curry on drums. They have remained inactive since releasing their album, EXACTLY what You ThiNk It Is.

== Career ==
In 1996, ex-DaisyFace members Sativa Novak and Dev Gilmore joined forces with ex-Wicked Jester guitarist Daniel "DD" Ehrlich to form SöuR. Ex-Wicked Jester drummer Rob Wood was on loan and recorded a 3-song EP, including "Amber Glo" and "Me", co-produced by Ken Van Druten and Robert Long, recorded and mixed by Mike Plotnikoff at A&M, Ocean and One on One Studios. Rob Wood was replaced by Brett Kerr for shows and then by Wade Murff. Dev Gilmore was replaced by Clint Yeager (DaisyFace, SuperFiends, Nova Cycle) on bass and the band went on to record "Am I Evil" at Rockline Radio, for Cleopatra Record's A Punk Tribute to Metallica in 2000. After one final lineup change, replacing Wade Murff with Tom Curry on drums and playing local shows with bands like Duff McKagen's Loaded, Otep, Pauley Parette's Lo-Ball, Ima Robot and Taime Downe's Newlydeads, SöuR went back into the studio to record Exactly What You Think It Is in 2002, produced and mixed by Greg Fidelman at Grand Master Recorders, Cello and Sound City.

In 2003 the band self-released their record and garnered a few reviews, chart positions and TV placements but failed to pick up tour support. One reviewer from AllMusic stated that "the group showed great potential", but claimed that "the group would be unstoppable if they were more extreme."

Stranded in Los Angeles, the band disbanded.

== Discography ==
- EXACTLY what You ThiNk It Is (2003) – Grey Goo Transmissions

== Members ==
Past members

- Sativa Novak – Vocals, guitars, keyboards (1996–2007)
- DD Ehrlich – Guitars, programming (1996–2007)
- Dev Gilmore – Bass (1996–2000)
- Clint Yeager – Bass (2000–2007, died 2023)
- Rob Wood – Drums (1996–1998)
- Brett Kerr – Drums (1998–2000)
- Wade Murff – Drums (2000–2001)
- Tom Curry – Drums (2001–2007)
