= Petite Soeur =

Island in Seychelles

Petite Soeur Island
Nickname: Small Sister Island
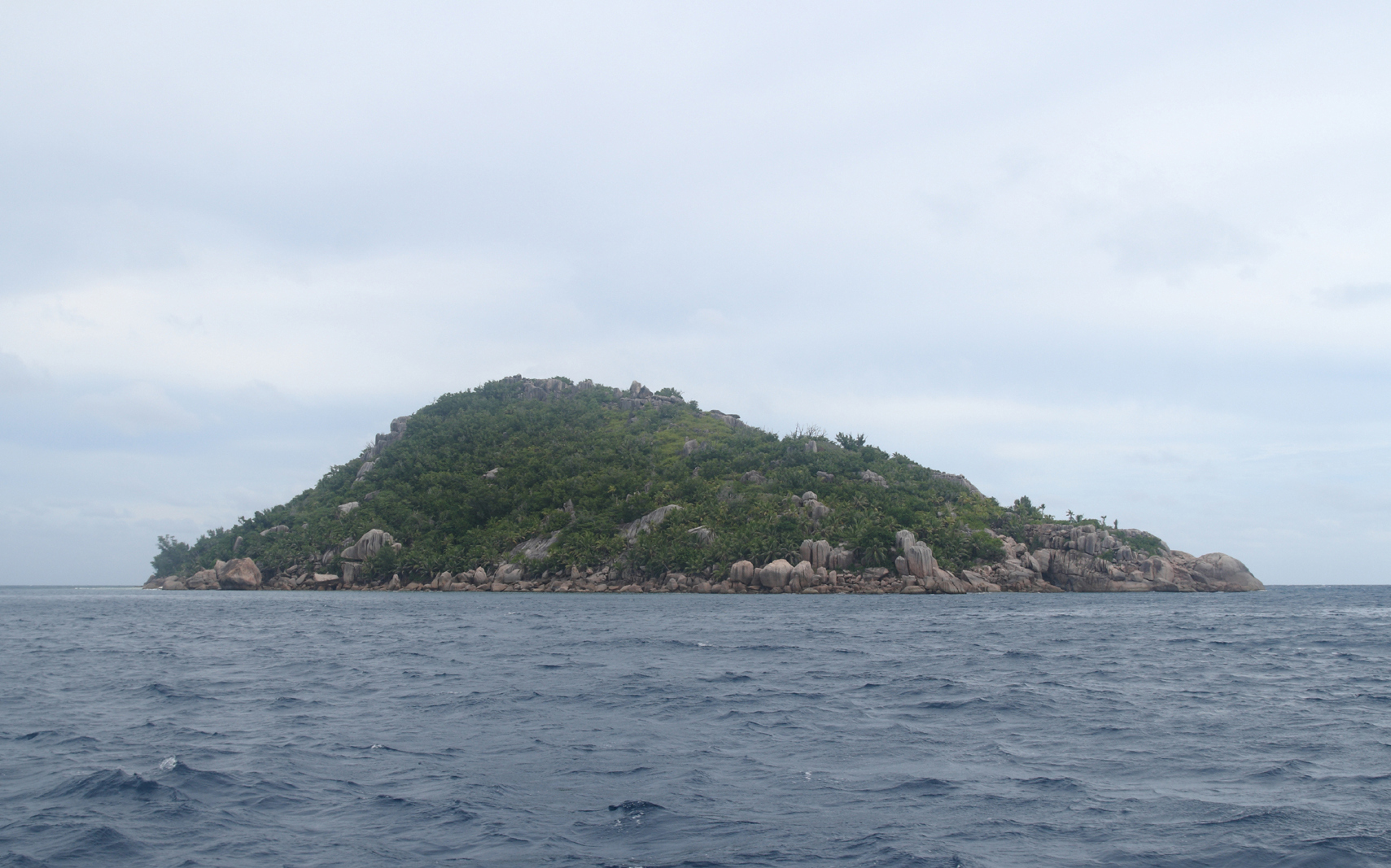

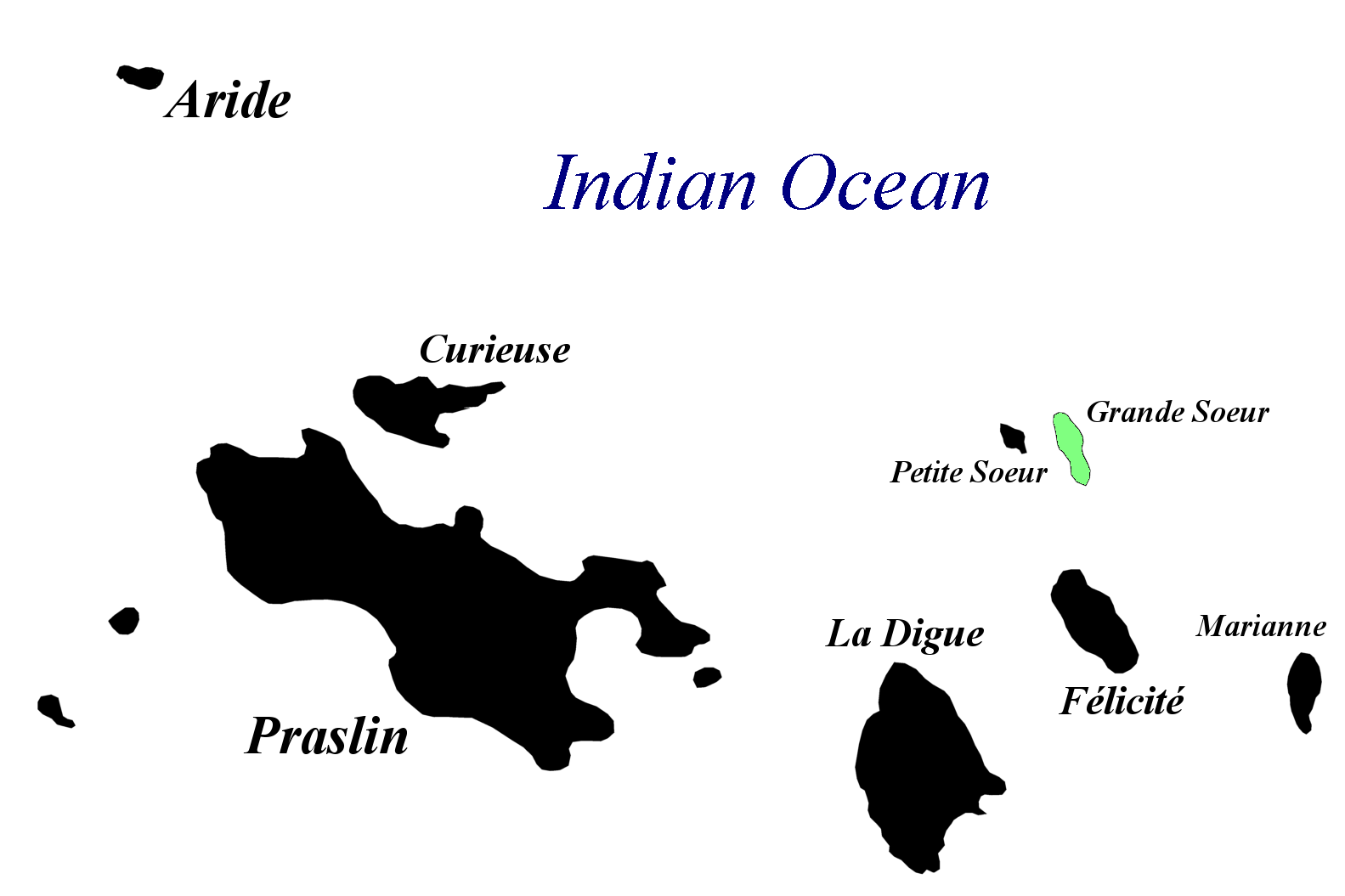
- Petite Soeur is to the west of Grande Soeur

- Location in Seychelles

Geography
- Location: Seychelles
- Coordinates: 04°17′13″S 55°52′13″E
- Archipelago: Inner Islands, Seychelles
- Adjacent to: Indian Ocean
- Total islands: 1
- Major islands: Petite Soeur Island
- Area: 0.35 km^{2} (0.14 sq mi)
- Length: 1.2 km (0.75 mi)
- Width: 0.45 km (0.28 mi)
- Coastline: 3.05 km (1.895 mi)
- Highest elevation: 105 m (344 ft)
- Highest point: Morne Soeur

Administration
- Seychelles
- Group: Inner Islands
- Sub-Group: Iles Soeurs
- Districts: La Digue and Inner Islands

Demographics
- Population: 0 (2014)
- Pop. density: 0/km^{2} (0/sq mi)
- Ethnic groups: Creole, French, East Africans, Indians.

Additional information
- Time zone: SCT (UTC+4)
- ISO code: SC-15
- Official website: www.seychelles.travel/en/discover/the-islands/

Petite Soeur Island, also called Small Sister, West Sister, is an island in the Seychelles archipelago, Located north of La Digue. It is part of Iles Soeurs with Grande Soeur. It is a granitic island covered with tropical forests. The island is privately owned.

== History ==
In 2005, the island was put up for sale, and was bought by hotel Château de Feuilles from Praslin Island. It is visited by their guests, especially for diving.

== Gallery ==
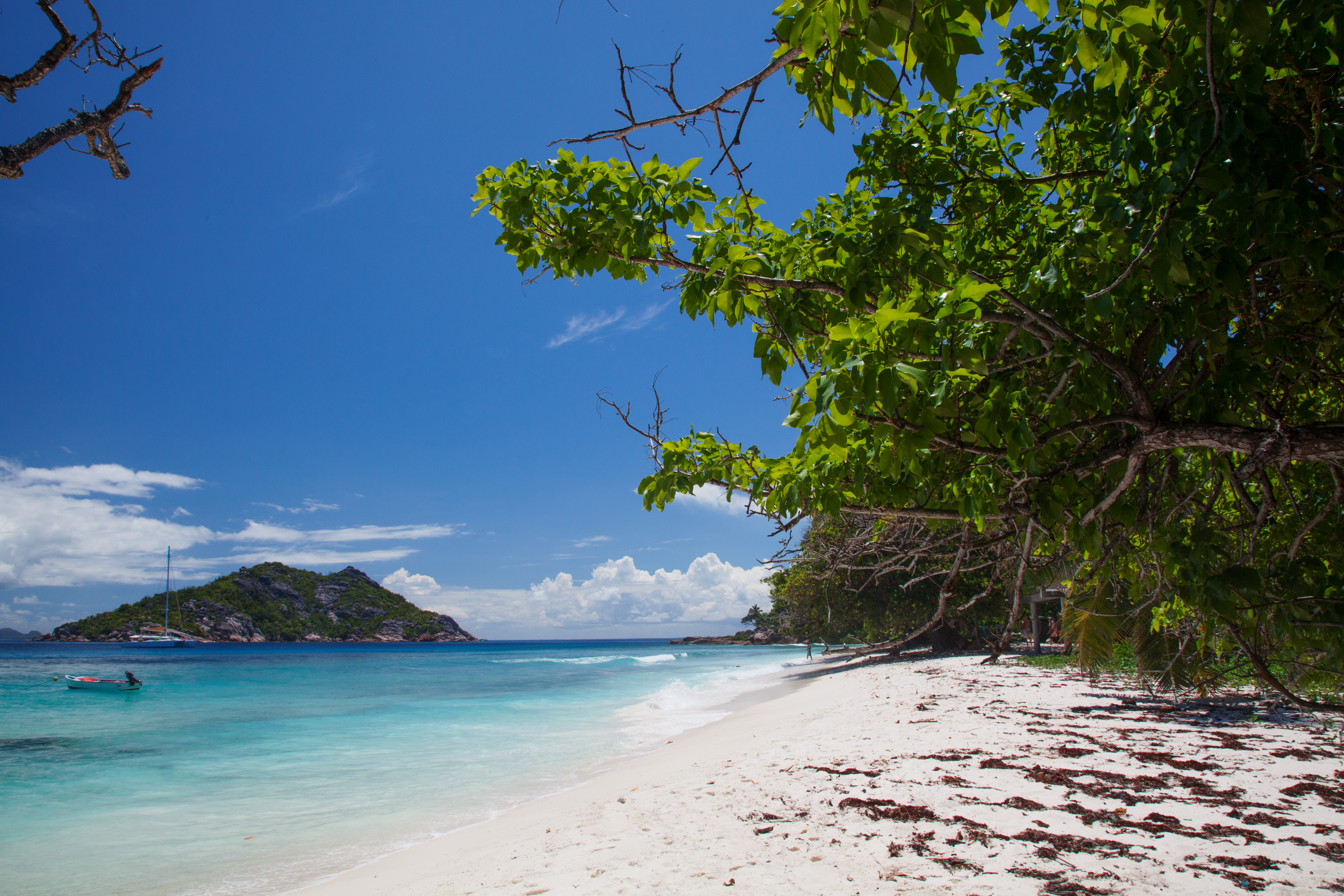
Beach on Grande Soeur, overlooking Petite Soeur.
