= La Digue =

Island of the Seychelles

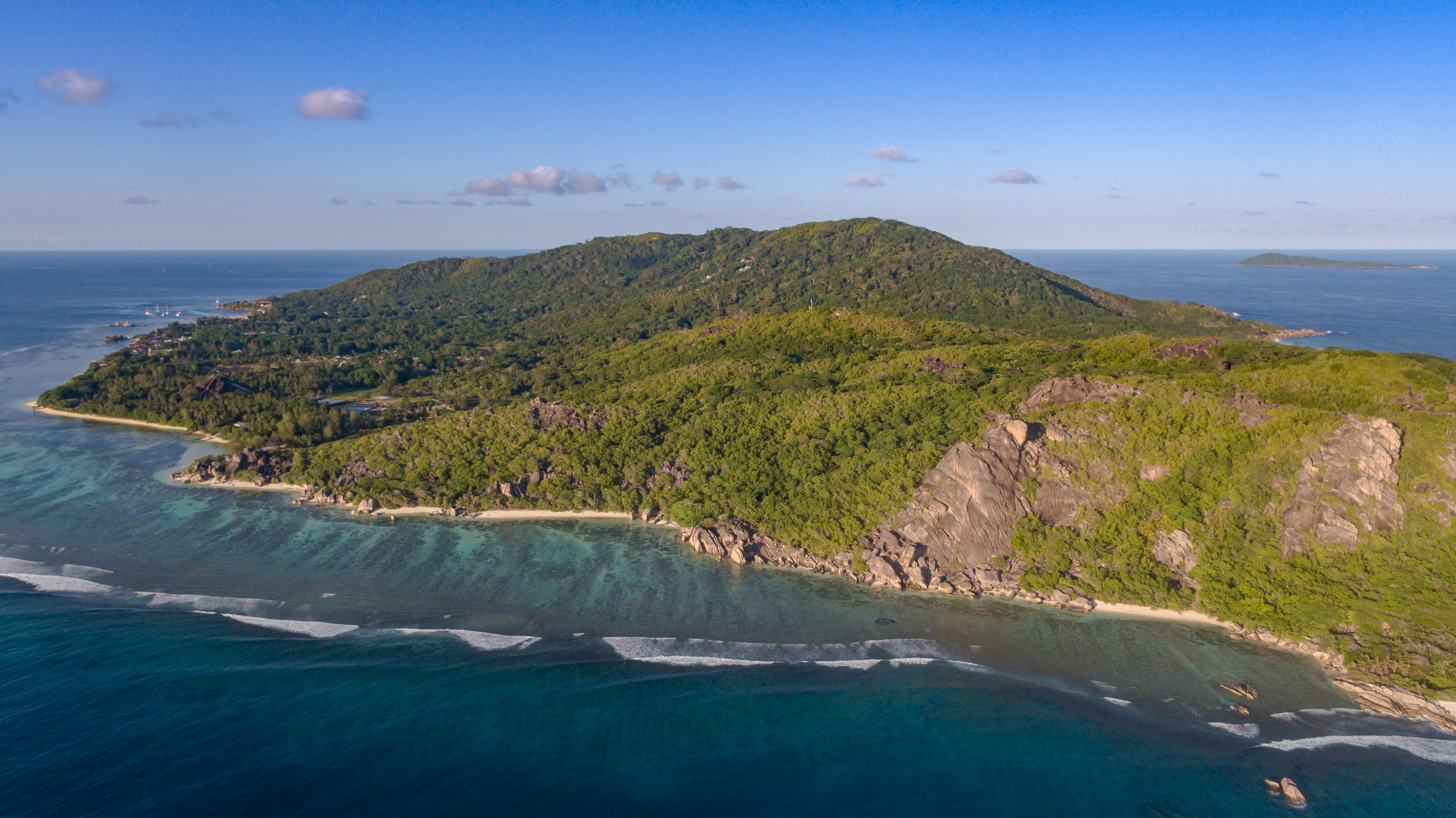
- Aerial of La Digue

- Map of the inner islands of Seychelles, showing the location of La Digue in the upper right

- Location in Seychelles

Geography
- Location: Seychelles, Indian Ocean
- Coordinates: 4°22′48″S 55°50′48″E
- Archipelago: Inner Islands, Seychelles
- Adjacent to: Indian Ocean
- Total islands: 1
- Major islands: La Digue
- Area: 10.08 km^{2} (3.89 sq mi)
- Length: 5 km (3.1 mi)
- Width: 3.3 km (2.05 mi)
- Coastline: 15.4 km (9.57 mi)
- Highest elevation: 333 m (1093 ft)
- Highest point: Belle Vue (Eagle's Nest Mountain)

Administration
- Seychelles
- Group: Inner Islands
- Sub-Group: Granitic Seychelles
- Districts: La Digue and Inner Islands
- Largest settlement: La Passe (pop. ~2500)

Demographics
- Population: 2800 (2014)
- Pop. density: 278/km^{2} (720/sq mi)
- Ethnic groups: Creole, French, East Africans, Indians.

Additional information
- Time zone: SCT (UTC+4)
- ISO code: SC-15
- Official website: seychelles.travel/en/discover/the-islands/
- La Digue Lighthouse
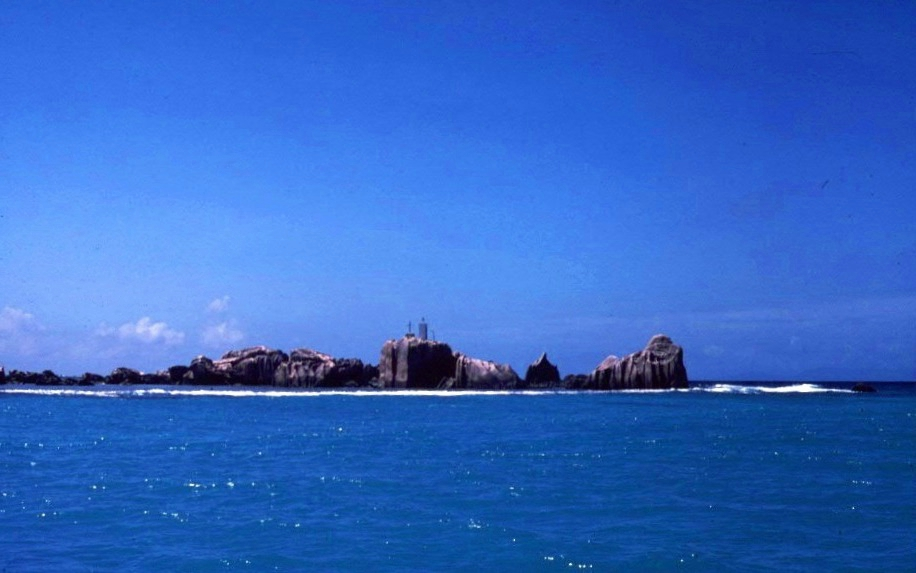
- Construction: masonry building
- Height: 3 m (9.8 ft)
- Shape: square prism small building with a mast atop
- Markings: white building
- Power source: solar power
- Focal height: 6 m (20 ft)
- Range: 5 nmi (9.3 km; 5.8 mi)
- Characteristic: Fl W 5s

La Digue is the third most populated island of the Seychelles, and fourth largest by land area, lying east of Praslin and west of Felicite Island. In size, it is the fourth-largest granitic island of Seychelles after Mahé, Praslin, and Silhouette Island. It has a population of 2,800 people. Most of the inhabitants live in the west coast villages of La Passe (linked by ferry to Praslin and Mahé) and Anse Réunion. There is no airport on La Digue, so to get there from a foreign country, one must fly to Victoria and continue by ferry, usually via Praslin. It has an area of 10.08 km^{2}, making it relatively easy to travel by bike or on foot.

La Digue was named after a ship in the fleet of French explorer Marc-Joseph Marion du Fresne, who visited Seychelles in 1768.

== History ==
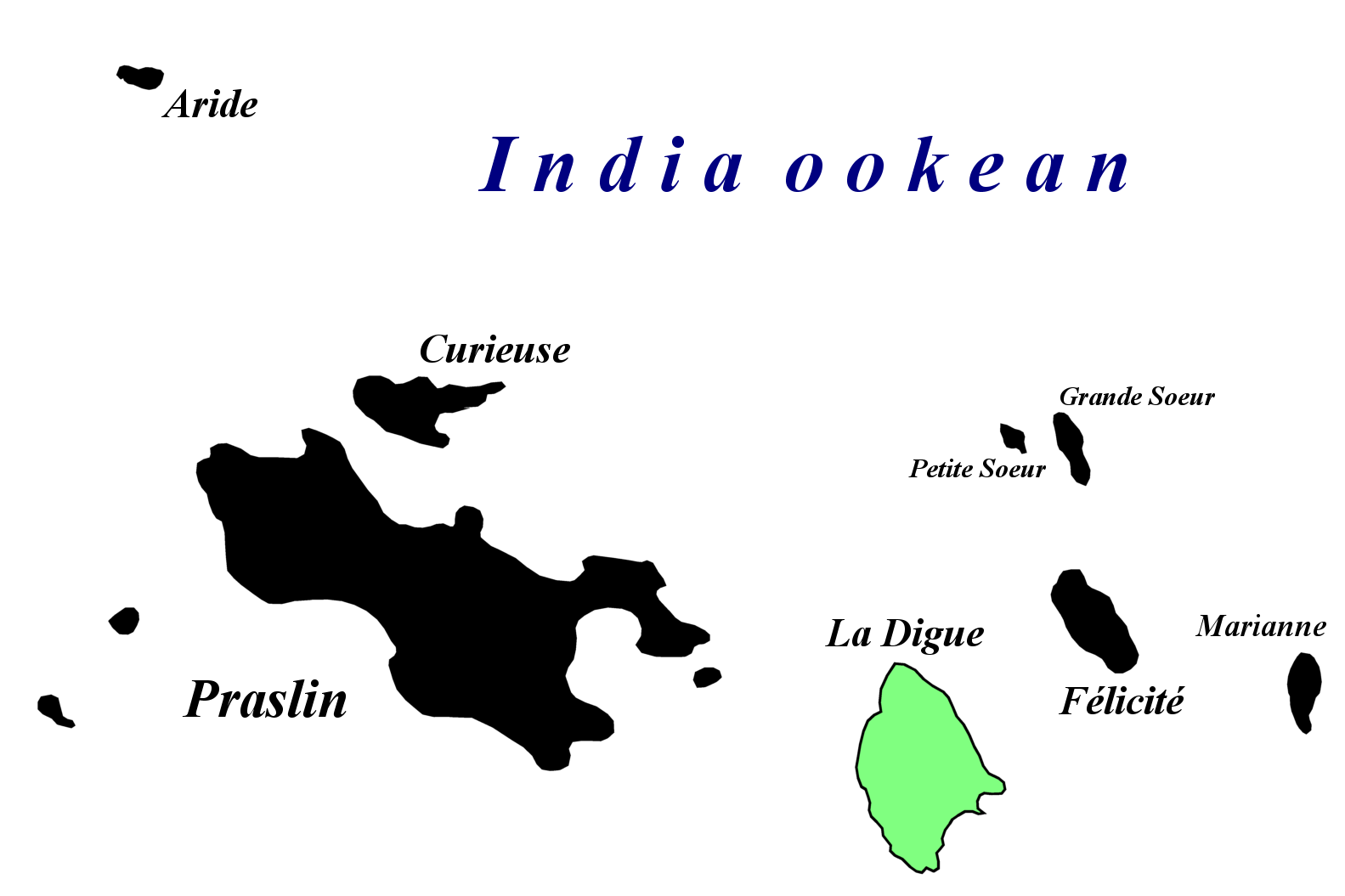
La Digue is to the east of Praslin

According to modern historians, La Digue was first sighted by the French navigator Lazare Picault in 1742, but it was not named until 1768. The first people settled on the island in 1789, when French colonists arrived with enslaved people from Africa. Most of them went back to France, but some people were left and some of today's inhabitants carry their names. Later, more French deportees arrived, followed by a large number of liberated slaves and Asian immigrants. In 1854, the first Catholic chapel was built on La Digue by Father Theophile. Most inhabitants of the island are of the Catholic faith. French colonists on La Digue manufactured coral lime, and they are believed to be responsible for the decline of the island's coral reefs. They also made copra out of coconuts, and they planted vanilla on their plantations. This tradition has been continued.

== Climate ==
Seychelles generally has warm temperatures throughout the year. They get frequent and sometimes heavy rainfall. On La Digue, rainfall can be very heavy, but it usually lasts for one hour or less. Daytime temperatures on La Digue normally range from 24 °C (75 °F) to 32 °C (90 °F); nighttime temperatures are slightly colder. The months with the heaviest rainfall are October to March, with monthly precipitation of 402.6 mm (15.85 in) in January. The month with the least precipitation is July, with only 76.6 mm (3.02 in) of rain.

== Culture ==
The inhabitants of La Digue are called Diguois. The first inhabitants arrived in 1798, exiled from Île Bourbon (now named Réunion) for taking part in a political rebellion there. They were supposed to be sent to the East Indies but bribed the captain to ship them to Seychelles instead where many had relatives. The population of La Digue is mostly Catholic and the island's feast day on 15 August is a national holiday.

== Politics ==
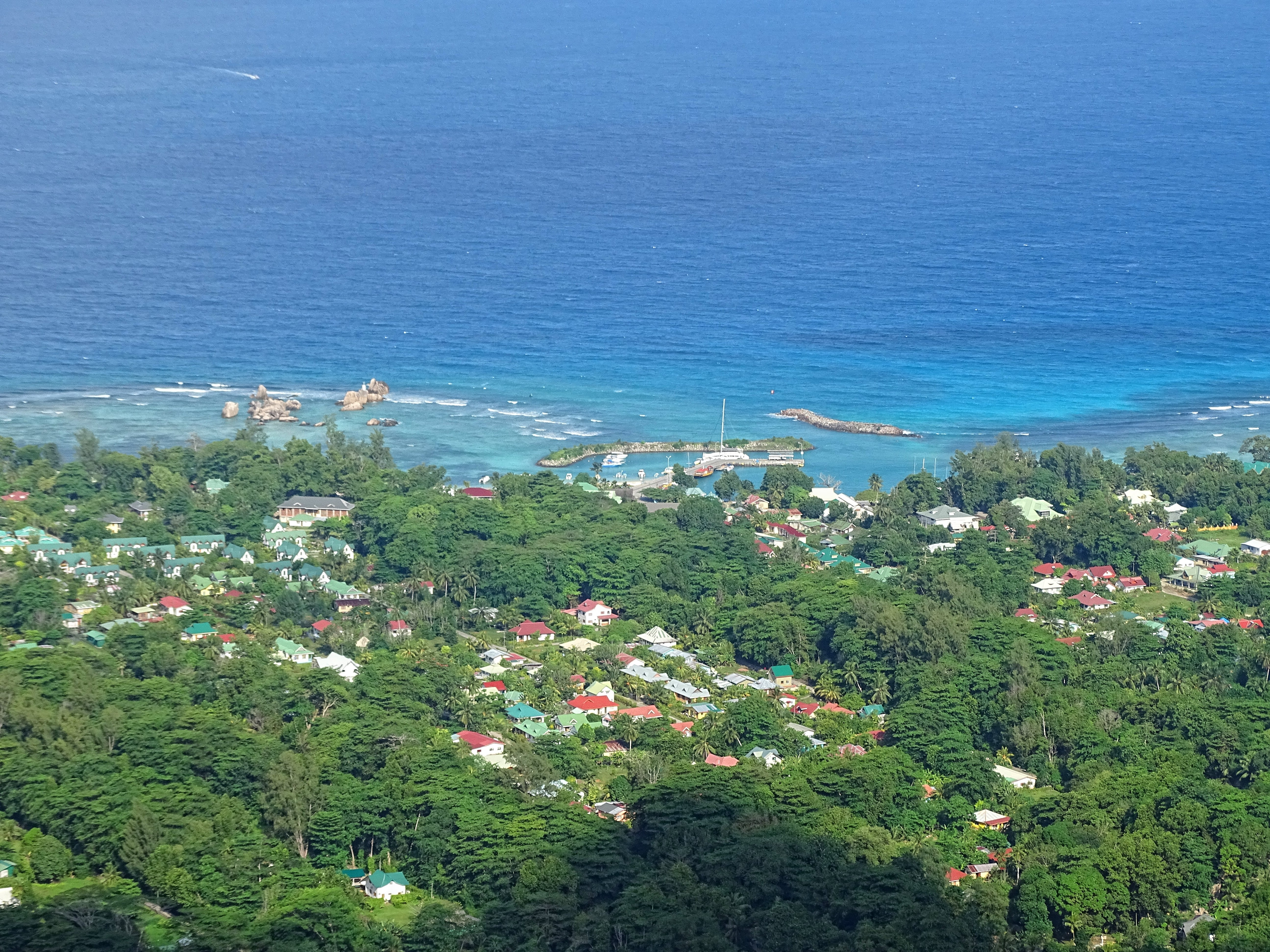
The administrative center on La Digue, La Passe.

There is no separate government of La Digue, so it follows the laws and legislation set by the government in Victoria. Seychelles has a president and the main political sides are the PP and SNP. The law system of Seychelles is modelled on European legal systems.

== Government services ==
Being an island with a population of only 2,800 people, there are few government buildings or services. For many services, people have to go to Praslin. La Digue has a post office which is closed on Sundays. There is a small police station that was mainly set up for tourists. There is a small hospital, although some inhabitants prefer to visit the hospitals in Praslin and Victoria. Women usually go to the hospital in Victoria to give birth.

== Tourism ==
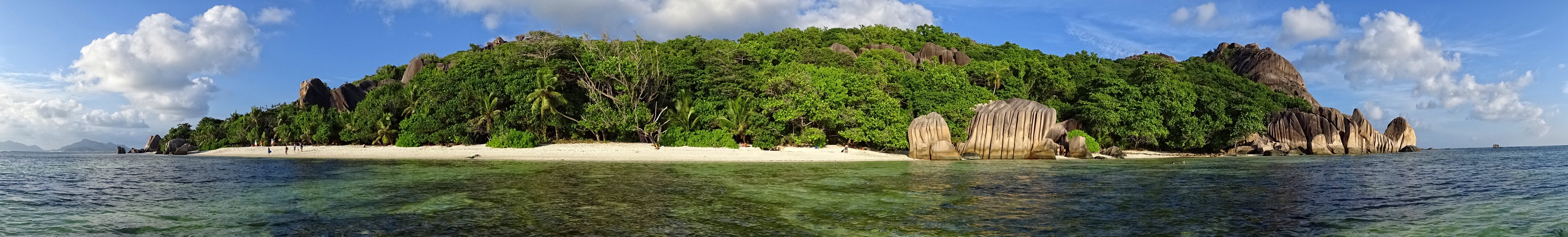
The beach and surrounding rocks at Anse Source d'Argent in the late afternoon.

Today, the island's main industry is tourism, and it is known for its beaches, especially Anse Source d'Argent and Grand Anse. La Digue, along with the rest of Seychelles, saw a major increase in tourism numbers in the late 20th century, which greatly impacted the economy of Seychelles. Before 1960, copra and vanilla production were the mainstays of the local economy, which are commemorated in the island's museum.

The Veuve Nature Reserve, in the island's interior, is home to the rare black paradise flycatcher, of which there are only about 100 in existence. La Digue's tallest peak, Belle Vue (Eagle's Nest Mountain), is in the central part of the island, with a summit more than 300 m (980 ft) above sea level. La Digue's wide variety of underwater creatures including fish, sharks, and rays also attracts many tourists for diving trips. The island has plenty of accommodations and activities for tourists, including more than twenty guesthouses and hotels, restaurants, and a dive centre. One can go on a boat trip or a diving trip around La Digue for half or full days. Furthermore, the Veuve Reserve offers tourists hiking trips with guides.

== Transport ==
The primary means of transportation is still the bicycle. It is possible to rent bicycles near the ferry pier. There are a few privately owned vehicles, but most cars and buses belong to hotel companies. Another method of transport on La Digue is the ox-cart, which has a slow pace suited to the island.

== Cuisine ==
Since La Digue is an island inhabited by many ethnic groups, the local cuisine is a mix of world cuisines, with a specific focus on fish. With abundant seafood, the Seychellois people have developed hundreds of recipes using a variety of fish. One can have fish curry, fish fillets, raw fish with lemon, grilled fish, steamed fish, cooked fish, and so on. The inhabitants of La Digue also make fried octopus, lobster with garlic and their biggest speciality – bat curry. A commonly used ingredient is ginger. The most popular alcoholic drink on La Digue is palm wine, which most Seychellois people like to make themselves by fermenting the inside of a coconut.

== Wildlife ==
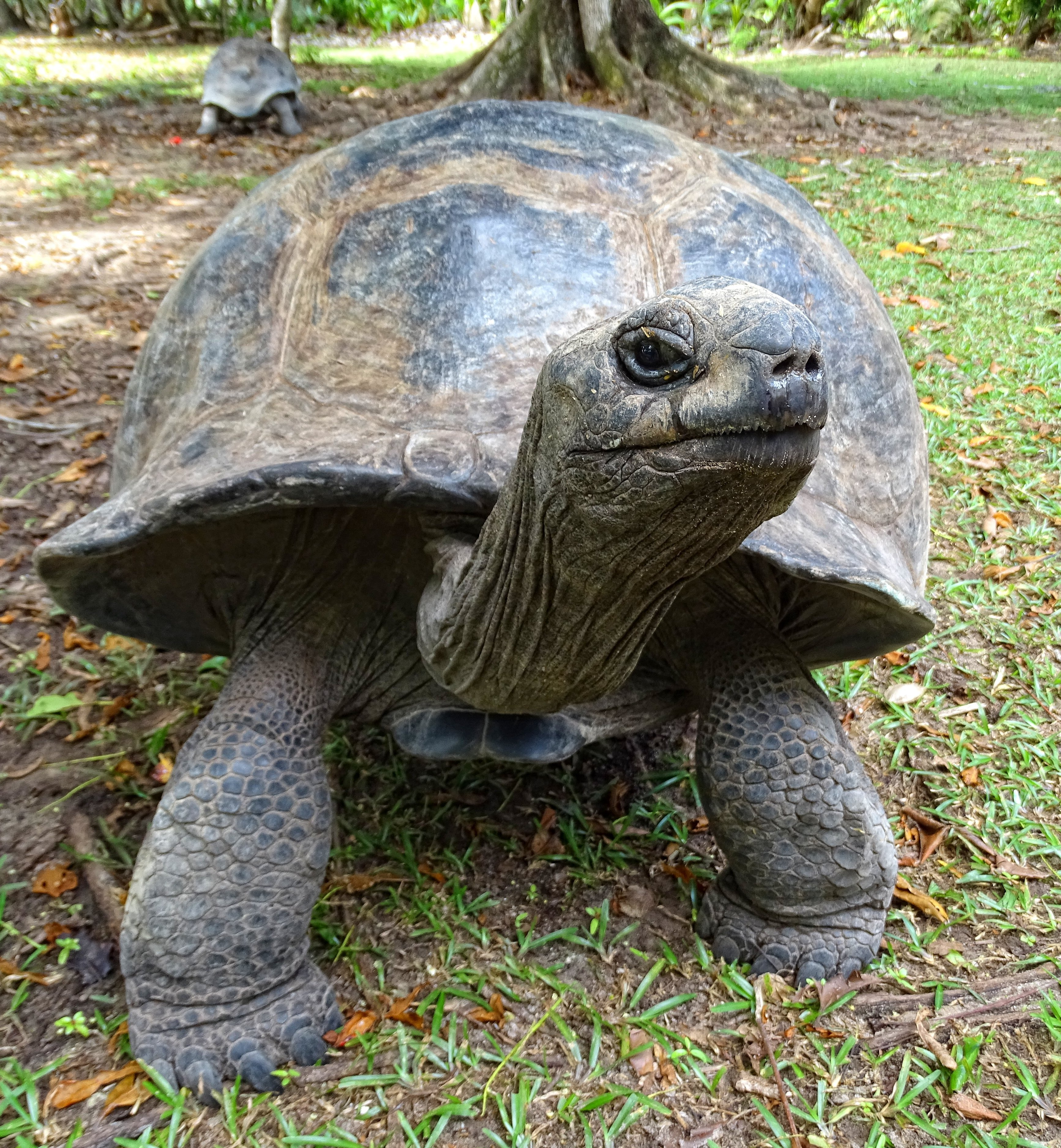
The giant tortoise of Aldabra

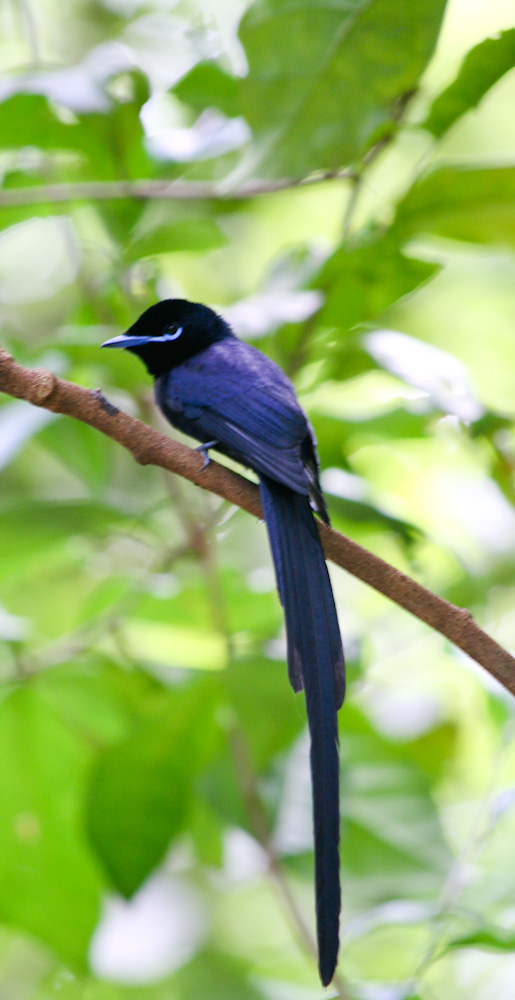
The rare Seychelles paradise flycatcher

La Digue is the home to the endangered paradise flycatcher. Other rare and endangered animals live on this island. Since Seychelles is detached from the rest of Africa, many of the species are endemic to La Digue. There is a significant population of giant tortoises that come from the island Aldabra. The subspecies that lived on La Digue is extinct. From the arthropod group there is, for example, the Seychelles coconut crab which likes to dig holes in the backyards of the Seychellois people. Among others, there are fodies, sunbirds, terns, fruitbats, sheath-tailed bats, and geckos.

The reefs and lagoons of La Digue offer a large amount of flora and fauna. Green sea turtles live on the very edges of the coral reefs, and they sometimes venture closer to the island. There are butterflyfish, eagle ray, moray eel and many other species of fish. Divers and snorkellers may be lucky enough to see blacktip reef sharks or even whale sharks, which come mainly in the winter but can be seen all year round.

Sadly, the animals that have traditionally lived on La Digue are threatened by animals that were brought there by the first inhabitants: rats, dogs, cats, etc. The rat population was probably the first animal that was brought to Seychelles. It quickly made many birds extinct by eating their eggs and threatening their nests. The dog and cat population is not nearly as much of a threat, but it still is something that the original species of Seychelles are not used to.

== Gallery ==
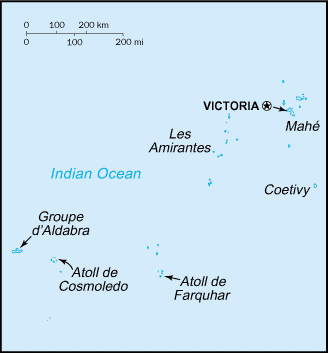
Map of Seychelles

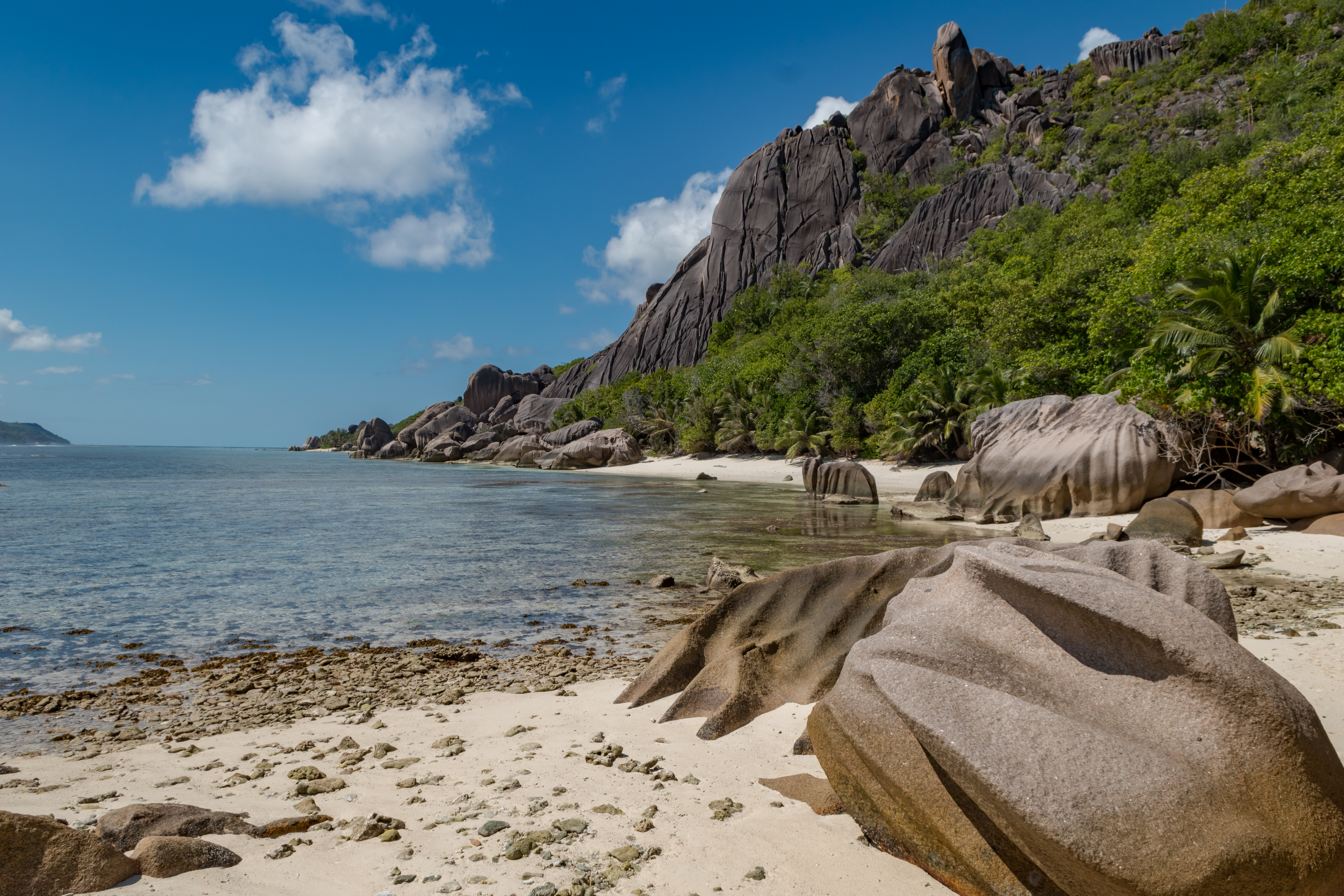
La Digue, Seychelles

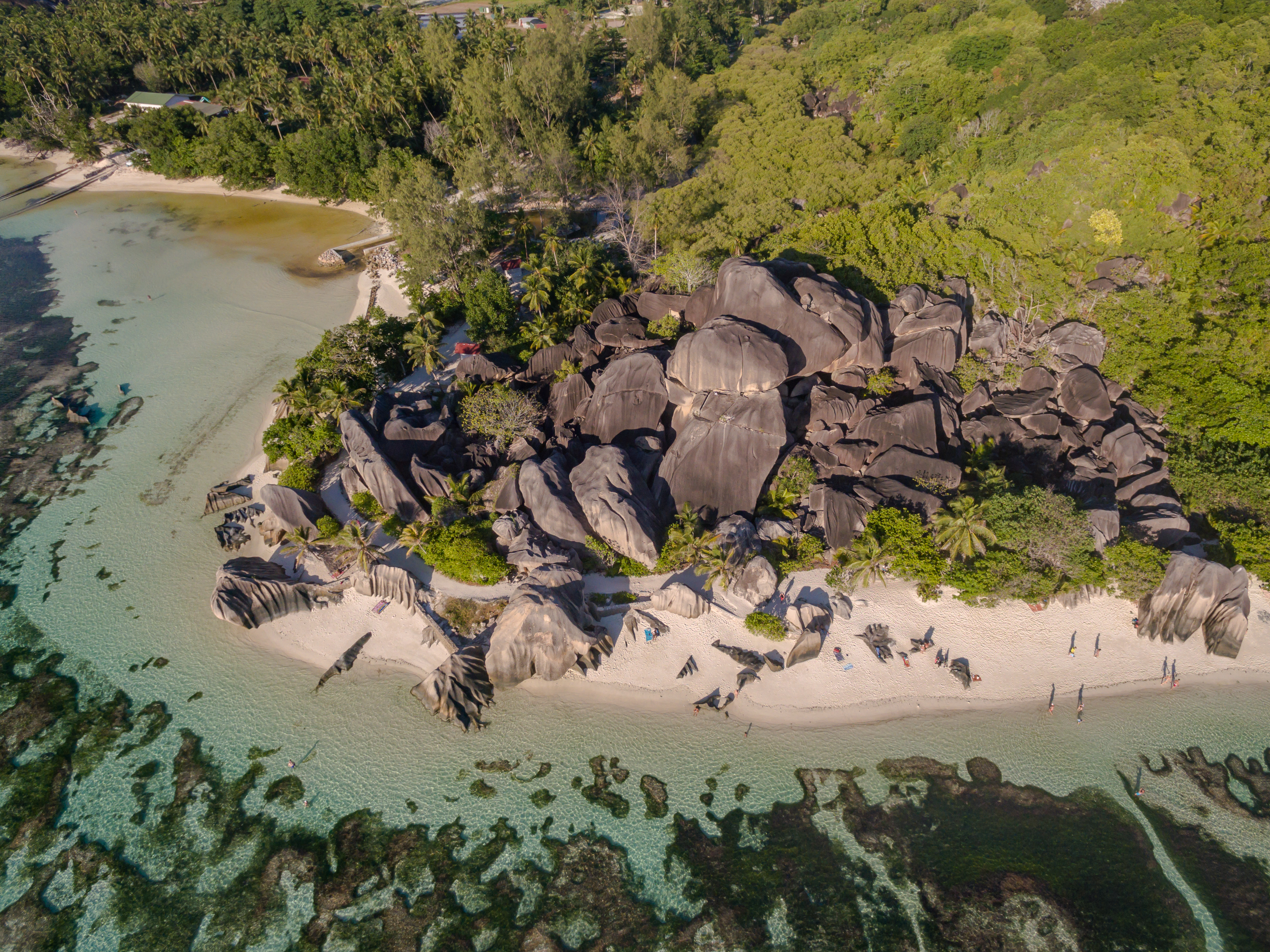
Aerial of Beach Anse Source d'Argent La Digue

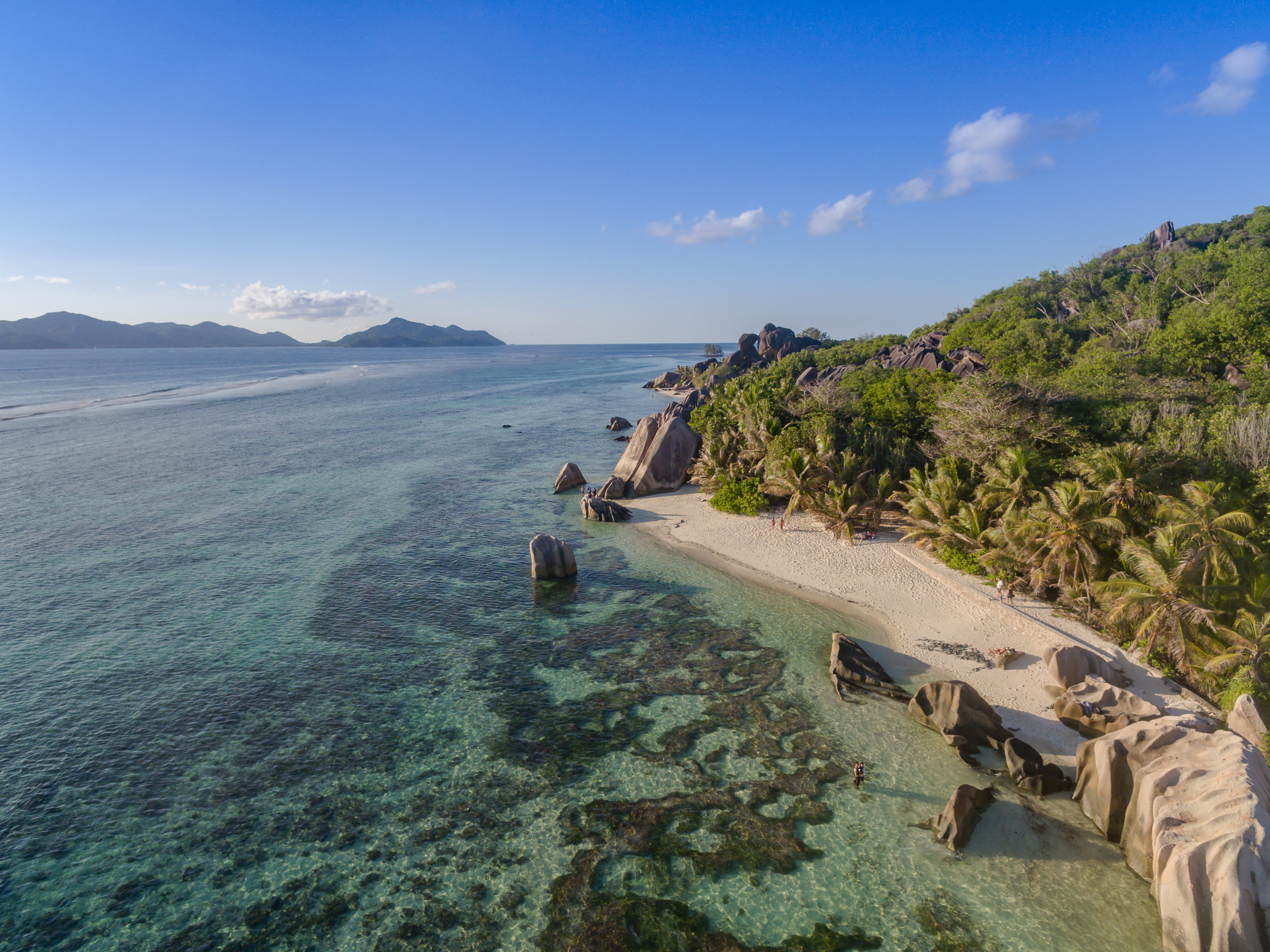
Der Strand Anse Source d'Argent auf La Digue

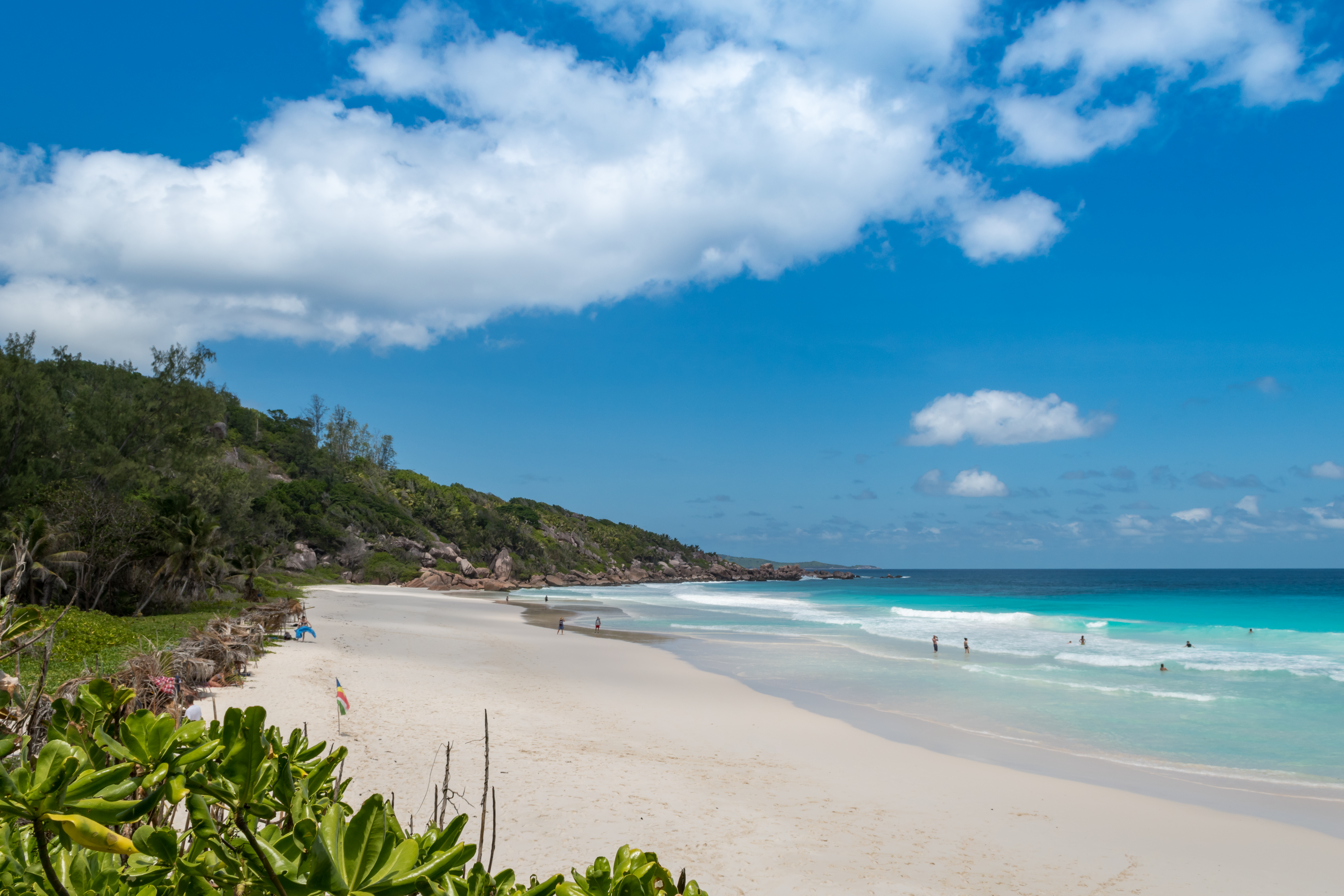
Beach Petite Anse La Digue

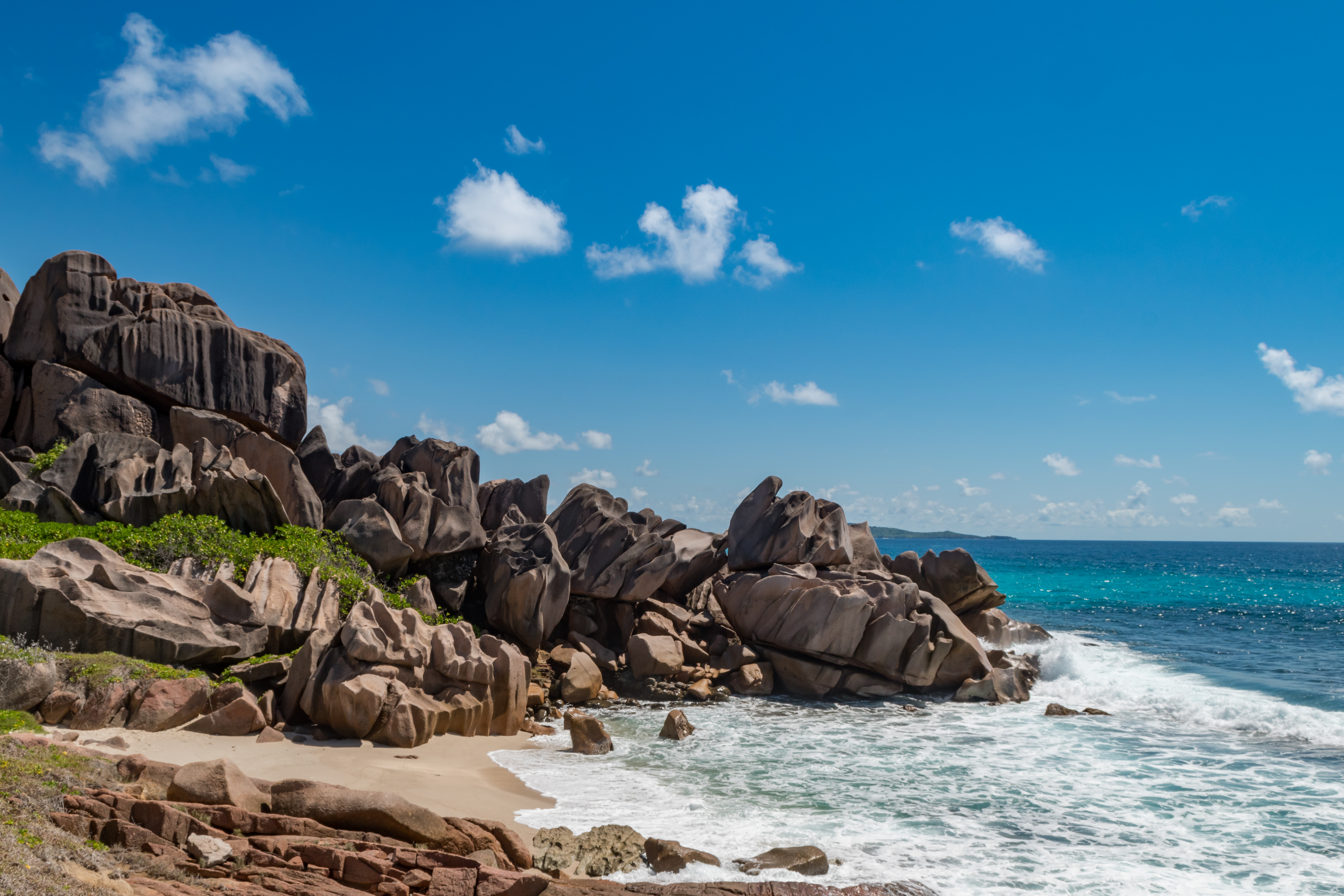
Beach Grand L' Anse La Digue

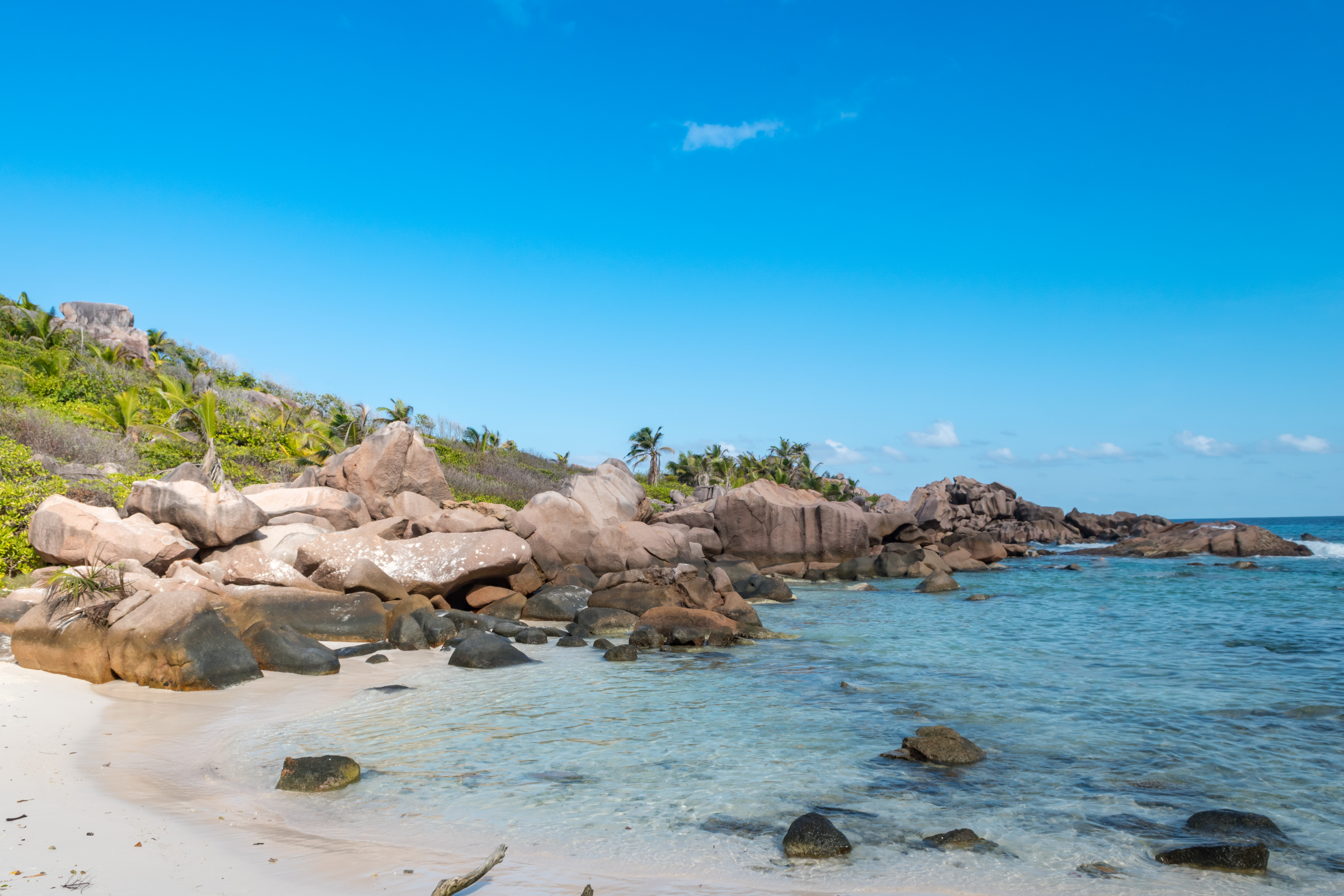
Beach Petite Anse Cocos La Digue

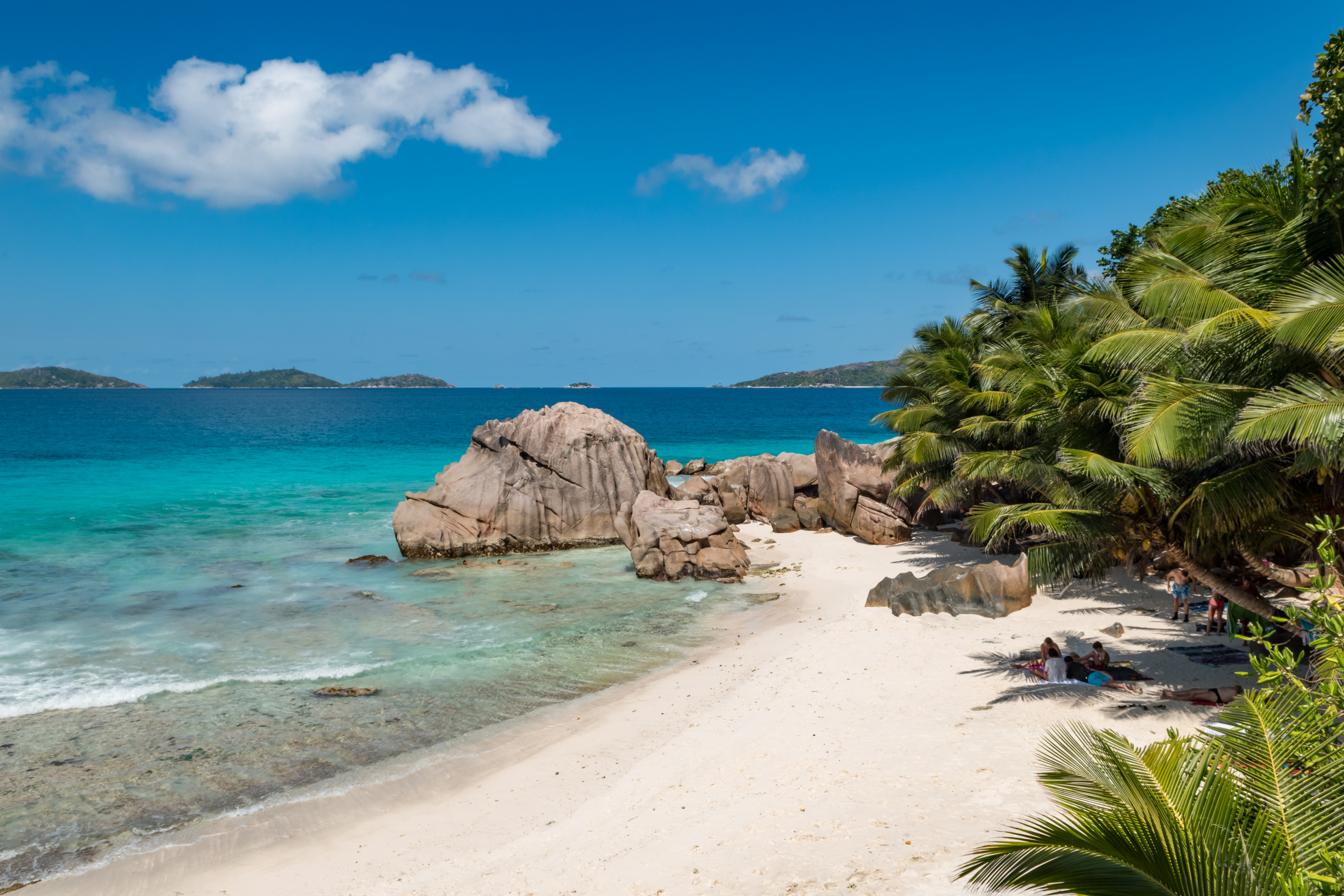
Beach Patates Cocos La Digue

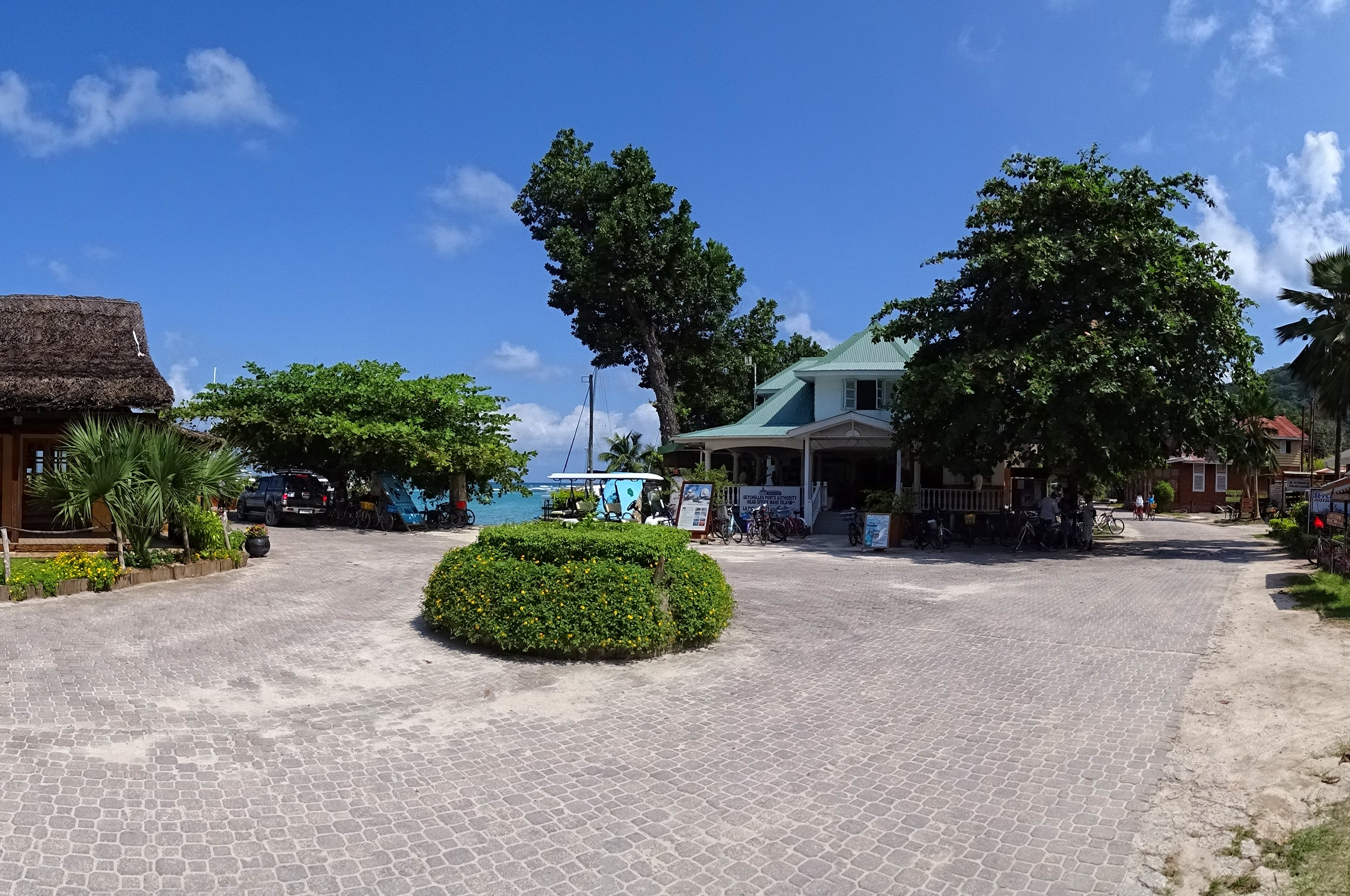
The La Passe village centre

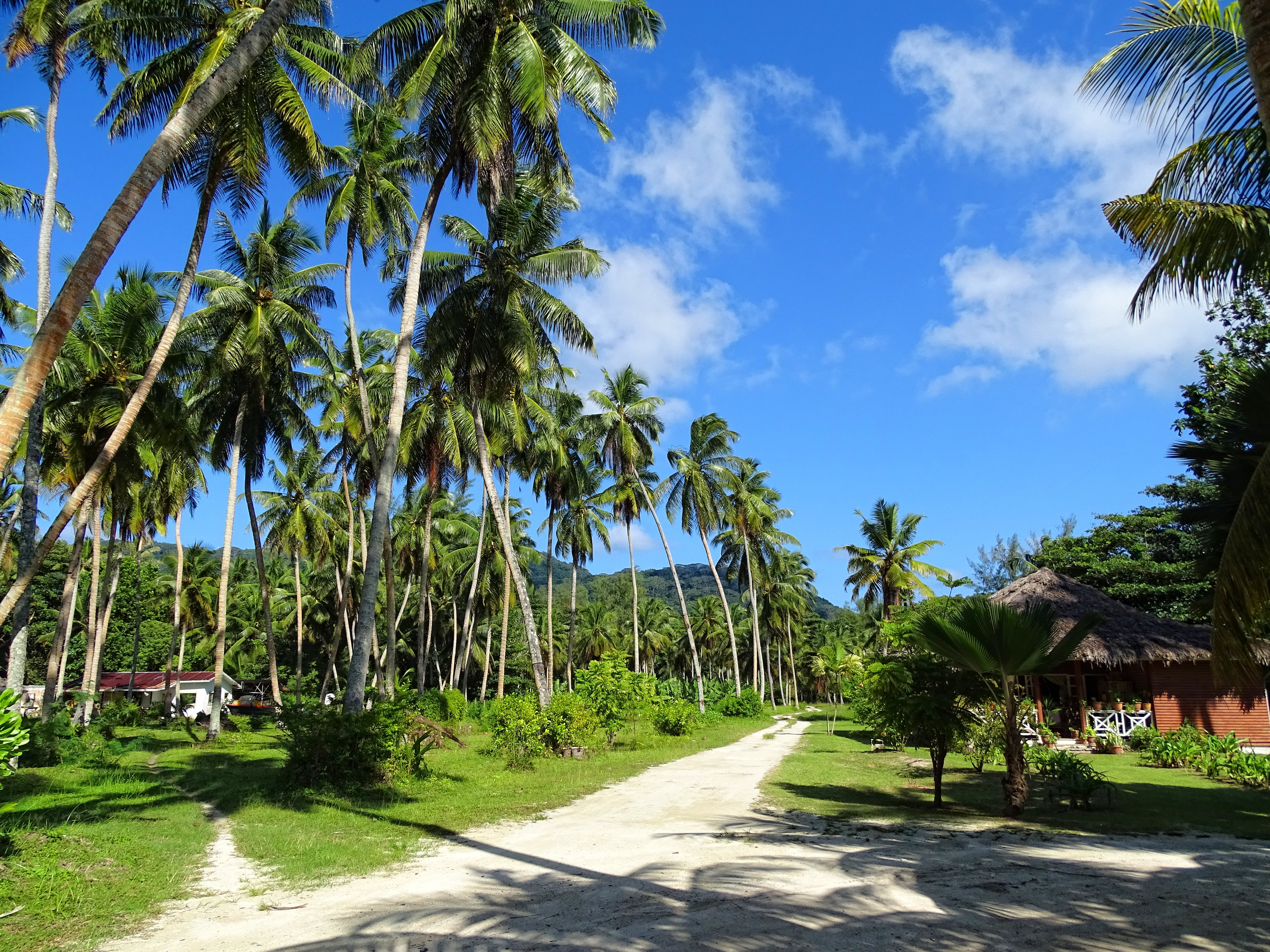
Coconut plantation

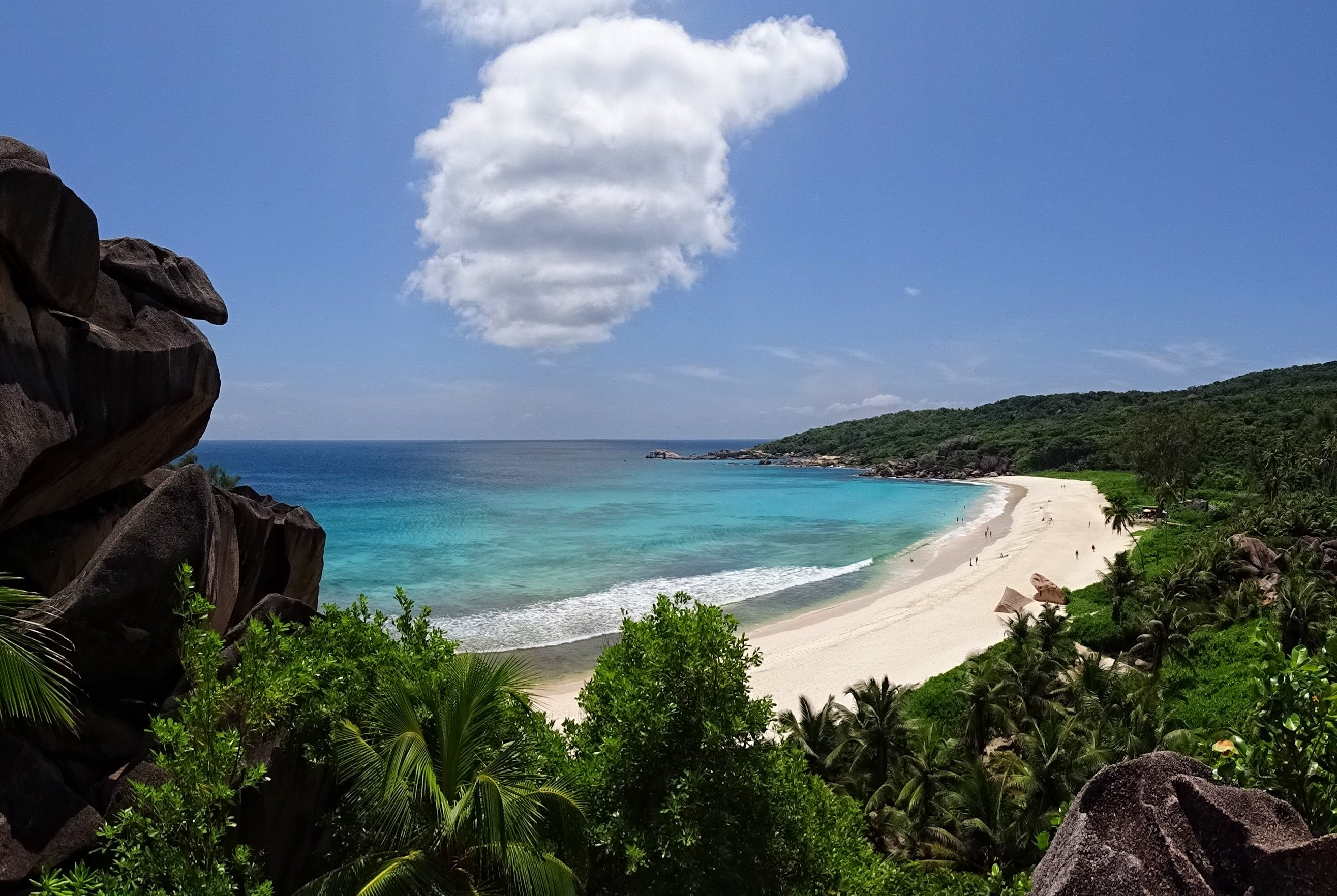
Grande Anse beach

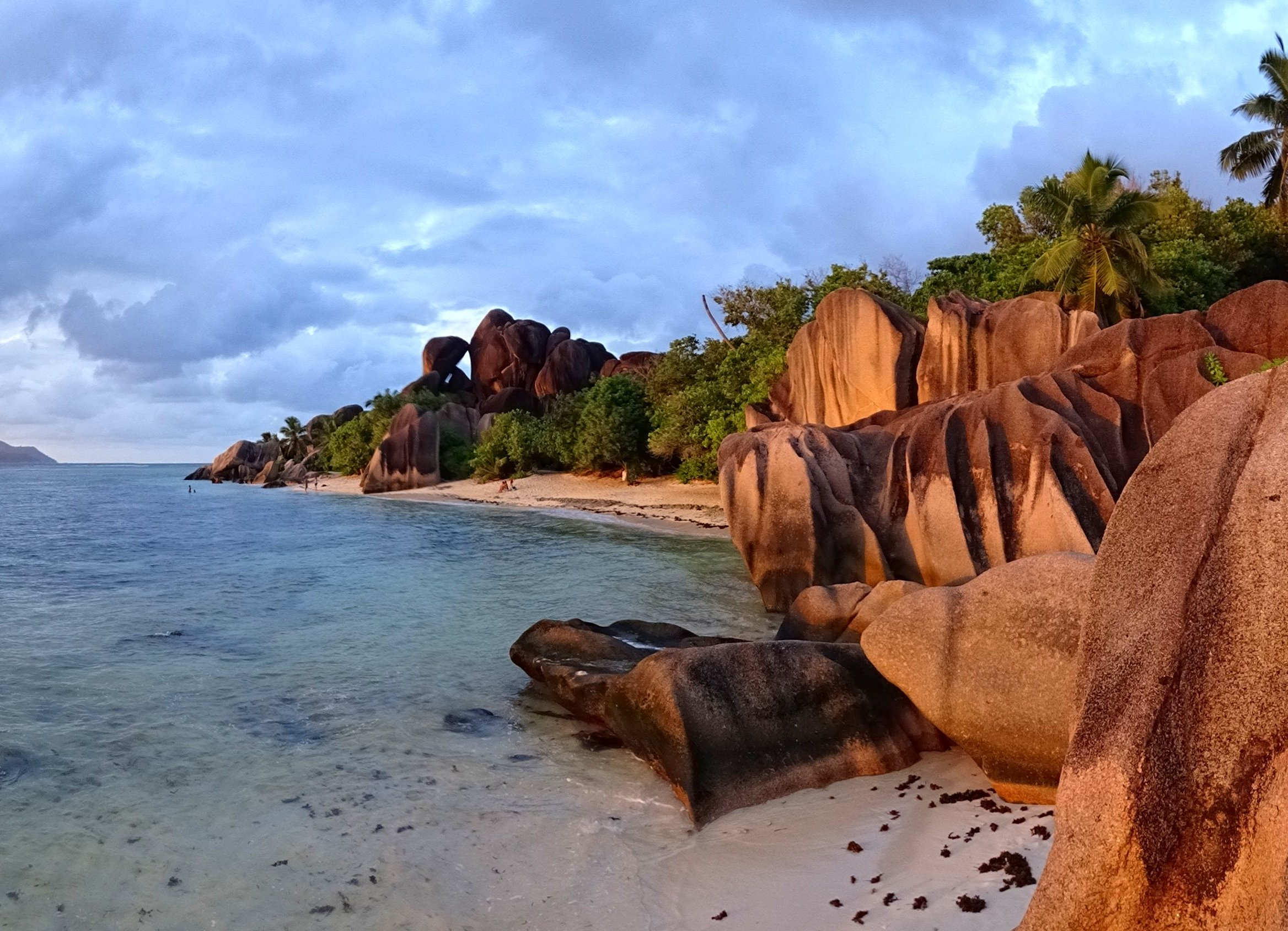
Anse Source d'Argent

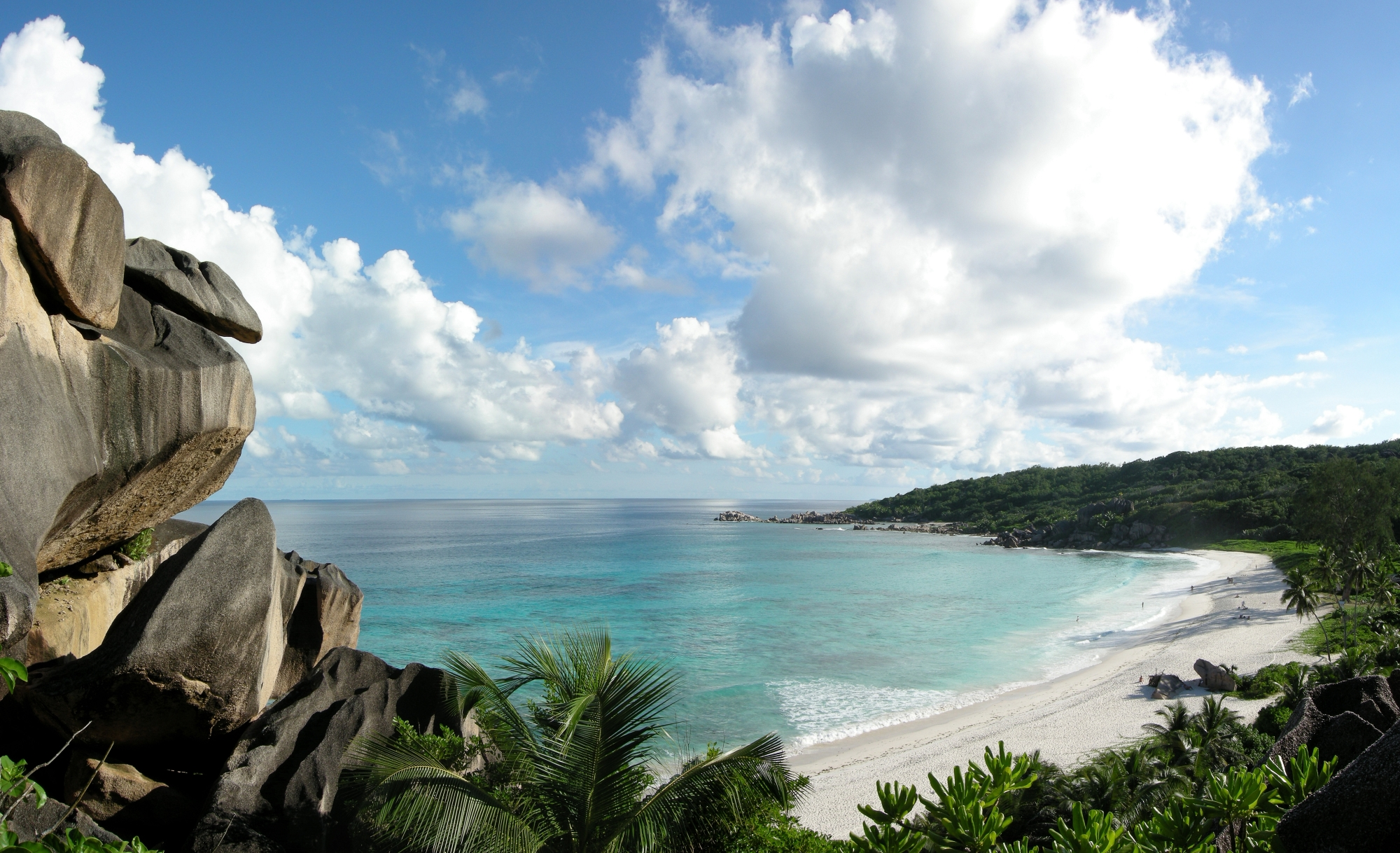
The spectacular beach of Grand Anse

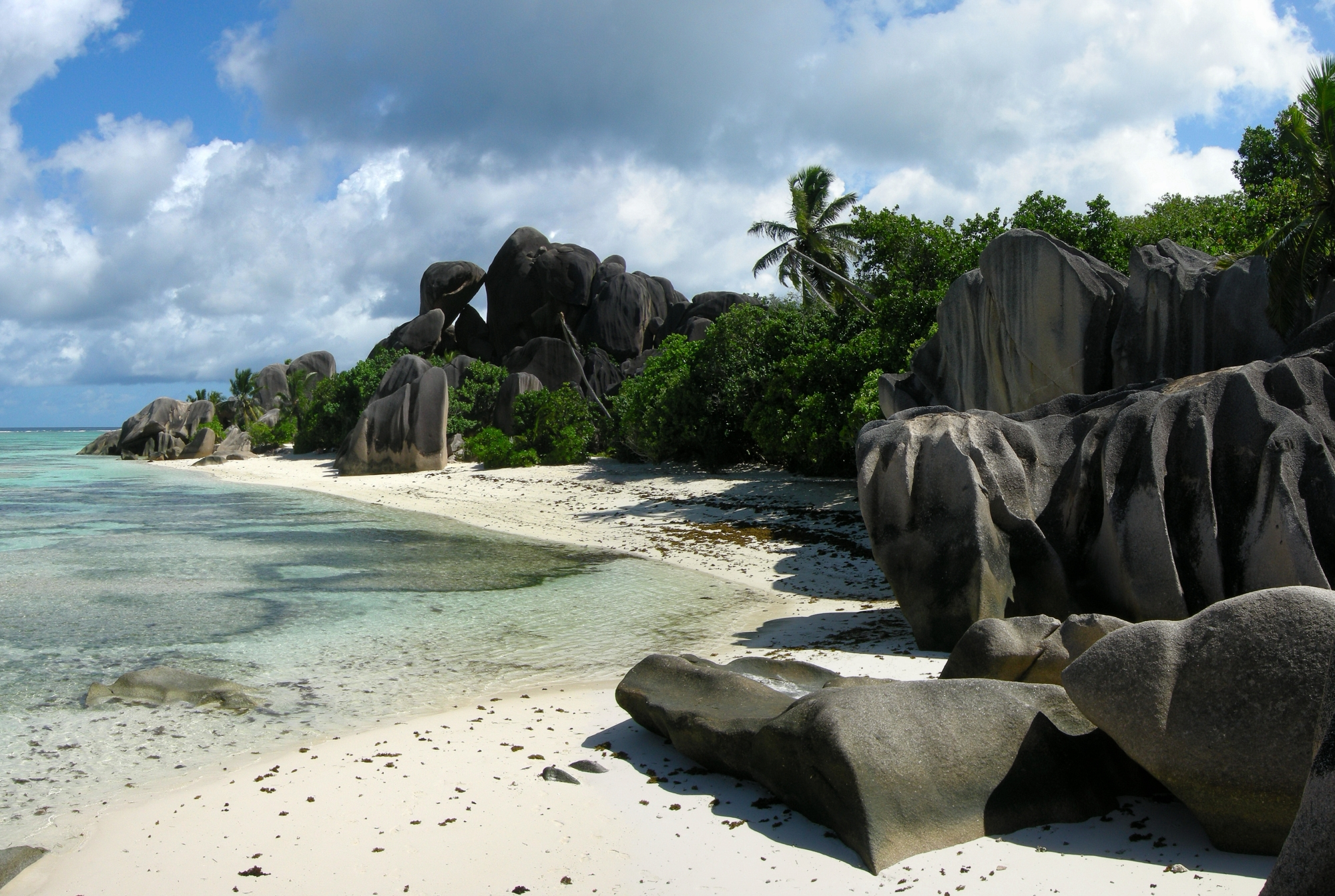
the spectacular beach of Anse Source d'Argent

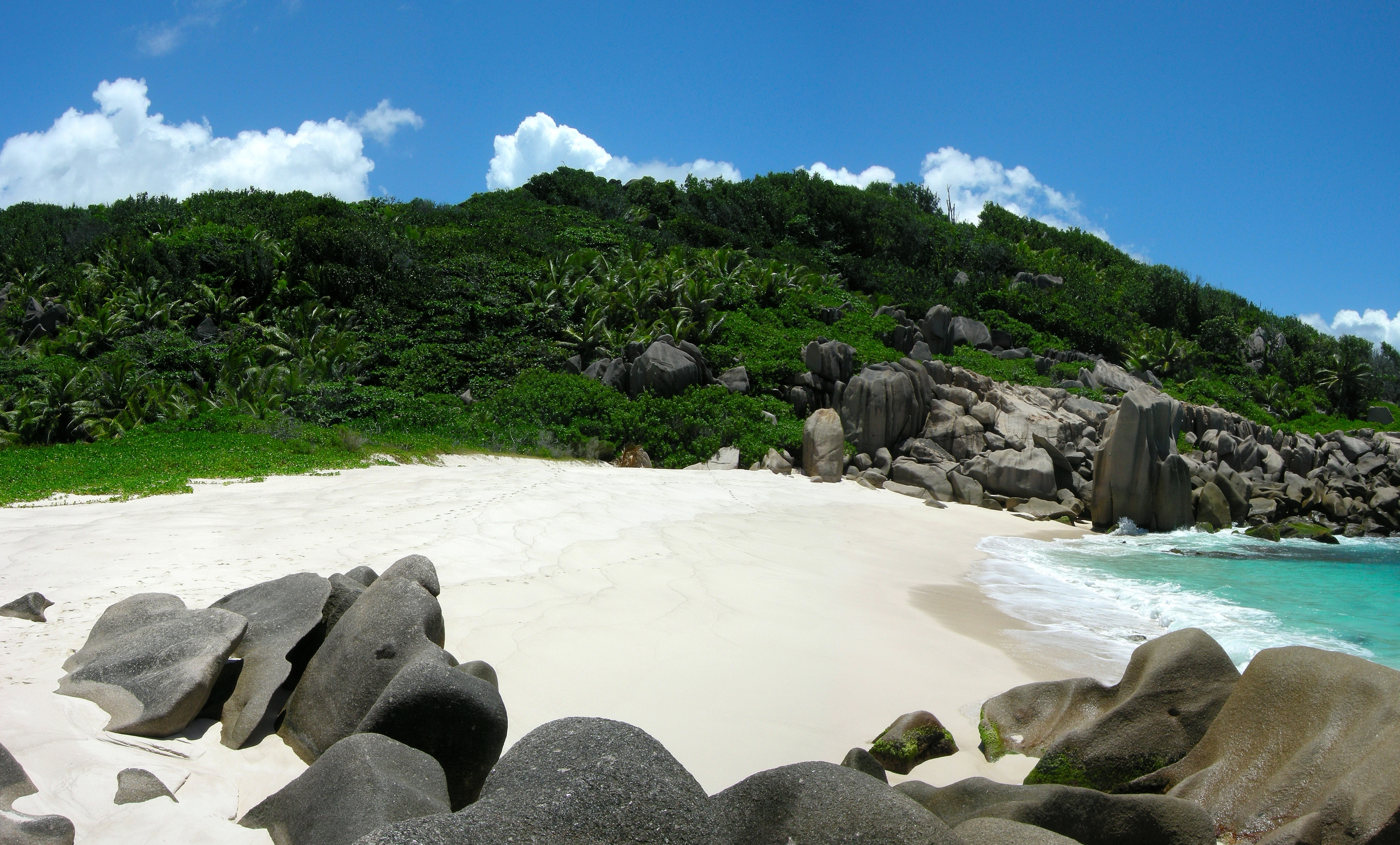
The lovely beach of Anse Marron

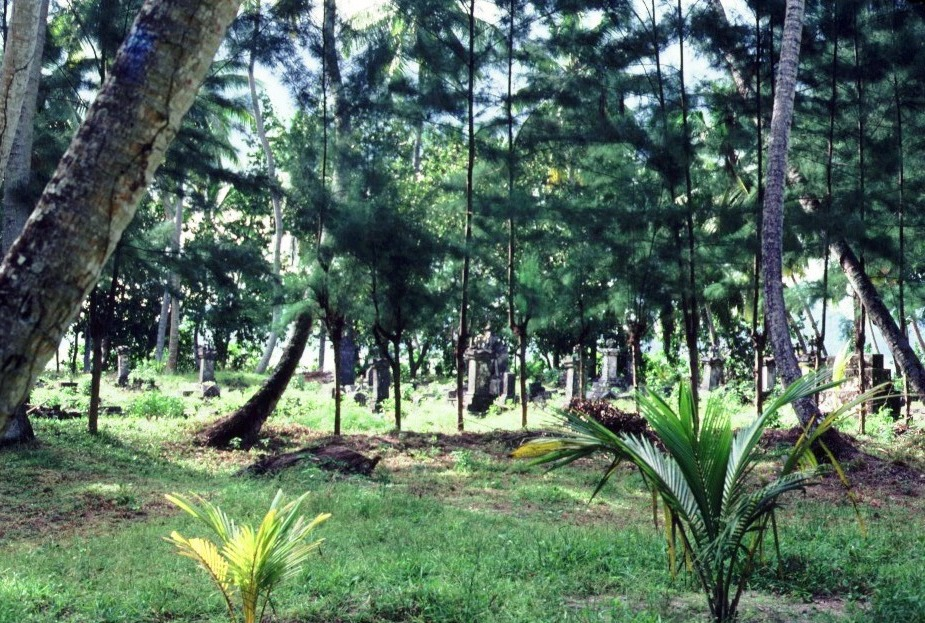
Cemetery

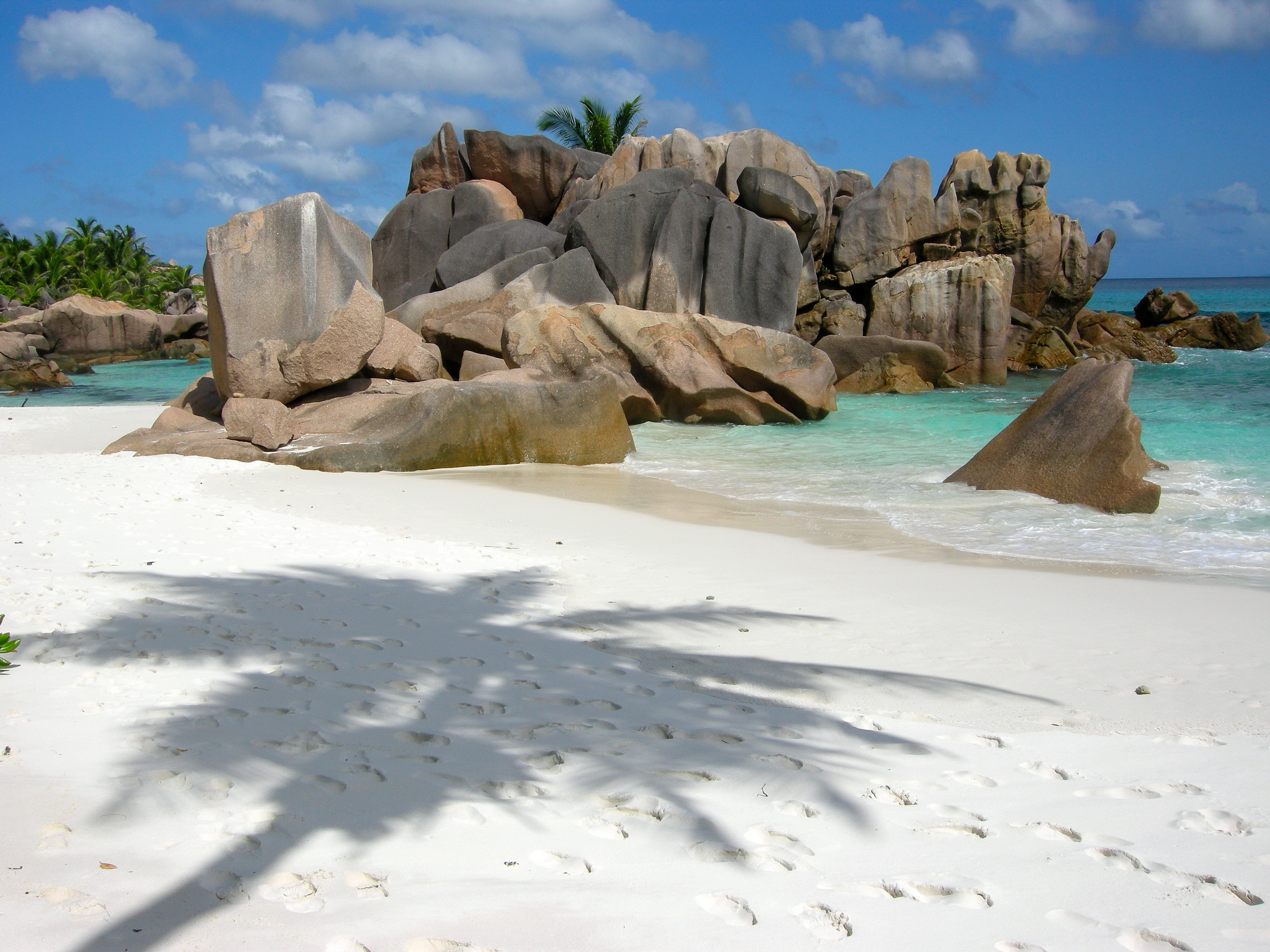
Anse Cocos

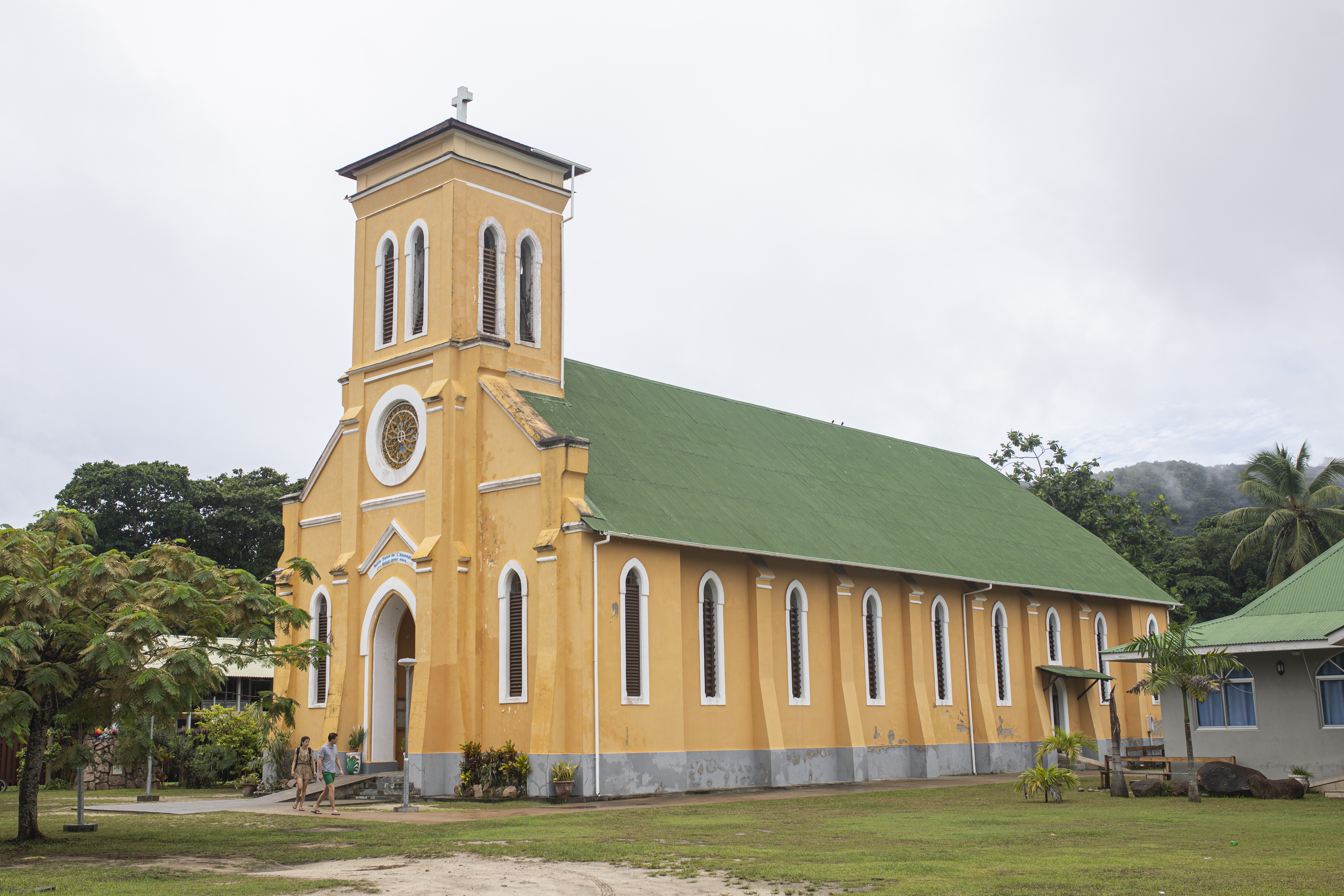
Notre Dame de L'Assomption Church, La Digue

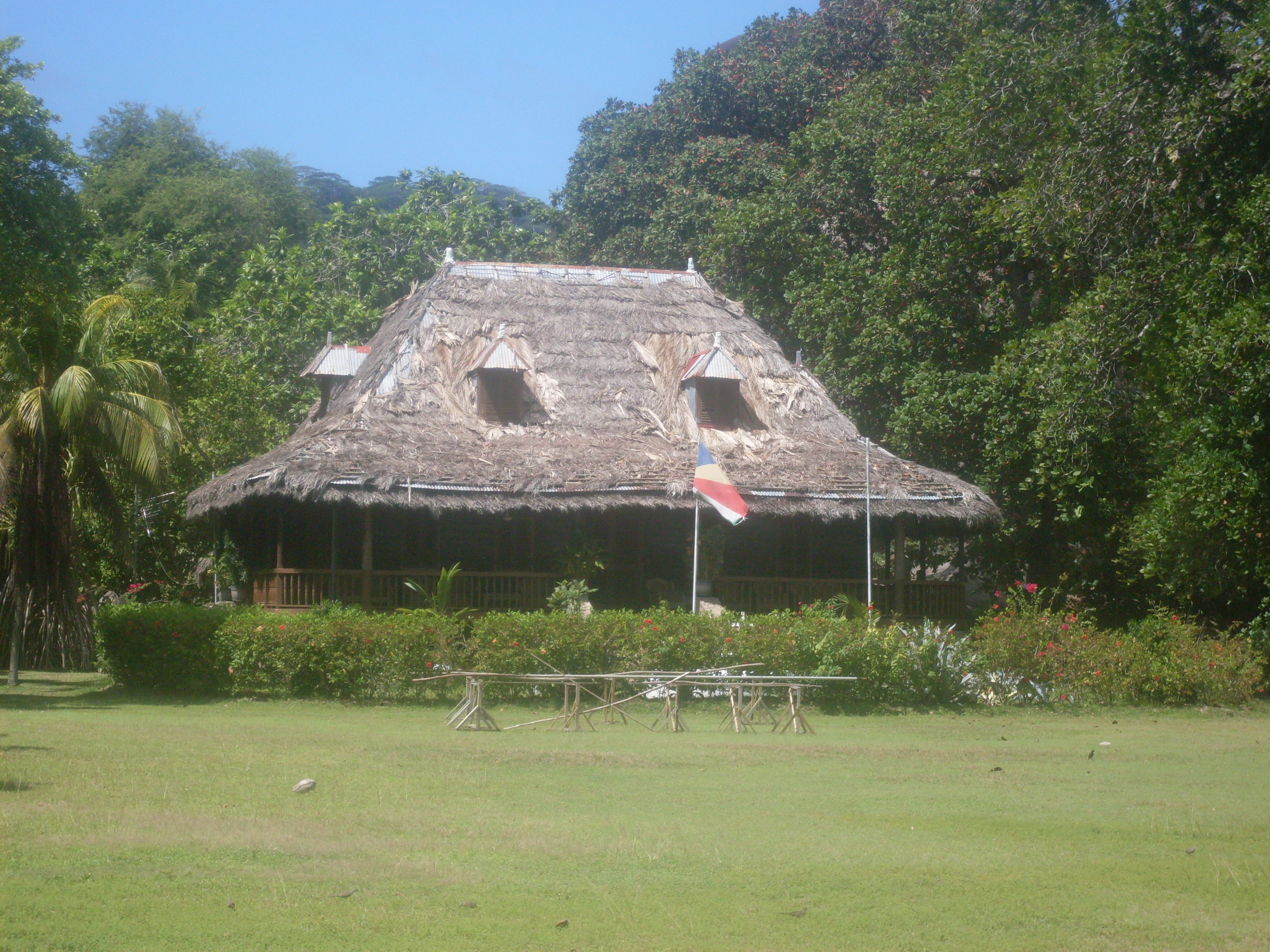
Historical house of families Rassool / Hossen on the L'Union Estate Farm

== See also ==
- Cocos Island, Seychelles
- List of lighthouses in Seychelles
