= Cachée Island =

Native name: Île Cachée
- Location within Seychelles

Geography
- Location: Seychelles, Indian Ocean
- Coordinates: 4°38′S 55°29′E
- Archipelago: Inner Islands, Seychelles
- Adjacent to: Indian Ocean
- Total islands: 1
- Major islands: Cachée
- Area: 0.022 km^{2} (0.0085 sq mi)
- Length: 0.22 km (0.137 mi)
- Width: 0.11 km (0.068 mi)
- Coastline: 0.55 km (0.342 mi)
- Highest elevation: 10 m (30 ft)

Administration
- Seychelles
- Group: Granitic Seychelles
- Sub-Group: Mahe Islands
- Sub-Group: St. Anne Islands
- Districts: Mont Fleuri

Demographics
- Population: 0 (2014)
- Pop. density: 0/km^{2} (0/sq mi)
- Ethnic groups: Creole, French, East Africans, Indians.

Additional information
- Time zone: SCT (UTC+4)
- ISO code: SC-18
- Official website: www.seychelles.travel/en/discover/the-islands/

Île Cachée is an islet in Seychelles.

The tiny island is also known as Faon island. The name of the island in French means "hidden", and as its name suggests it appears ‘hidden’ either behind Cerf or appear to be part of Cerf Island (it is possible to walk there on low tide). The tiny islet is located about 100 meters from Cerf Island in the St. Anne Islands. The water surrounding the island is not particularly deep, but at low tide it recedes completely, allowing visitors to simply walk across the sand from Cerf Island to reach this isolated spot. Alternatively, it is possible to reach Ile Cachée at high tide with a boat.

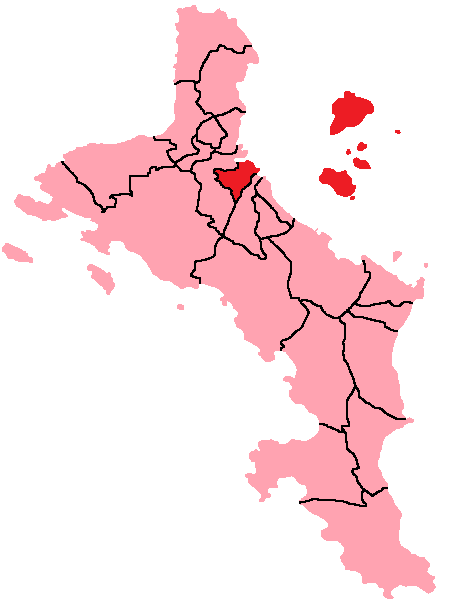
District Map

The water in this area is shallow enough to make it safe for swimming and snorkeling, and the coral reef ensures that there is some underwater scenery on offer. It is also rumored that pirates once buried some of their stolen treasure on Ile Cachée.

The island has an area of 0.022 km^{2}, and it is a nesting site for seabirds. About 100 meters to its southwest lies a granite rock called Zave, 0.15 acres in size.
