= Long Island, Seychelles =

Island in Seychelles

Long Island
Native name: Île Longue
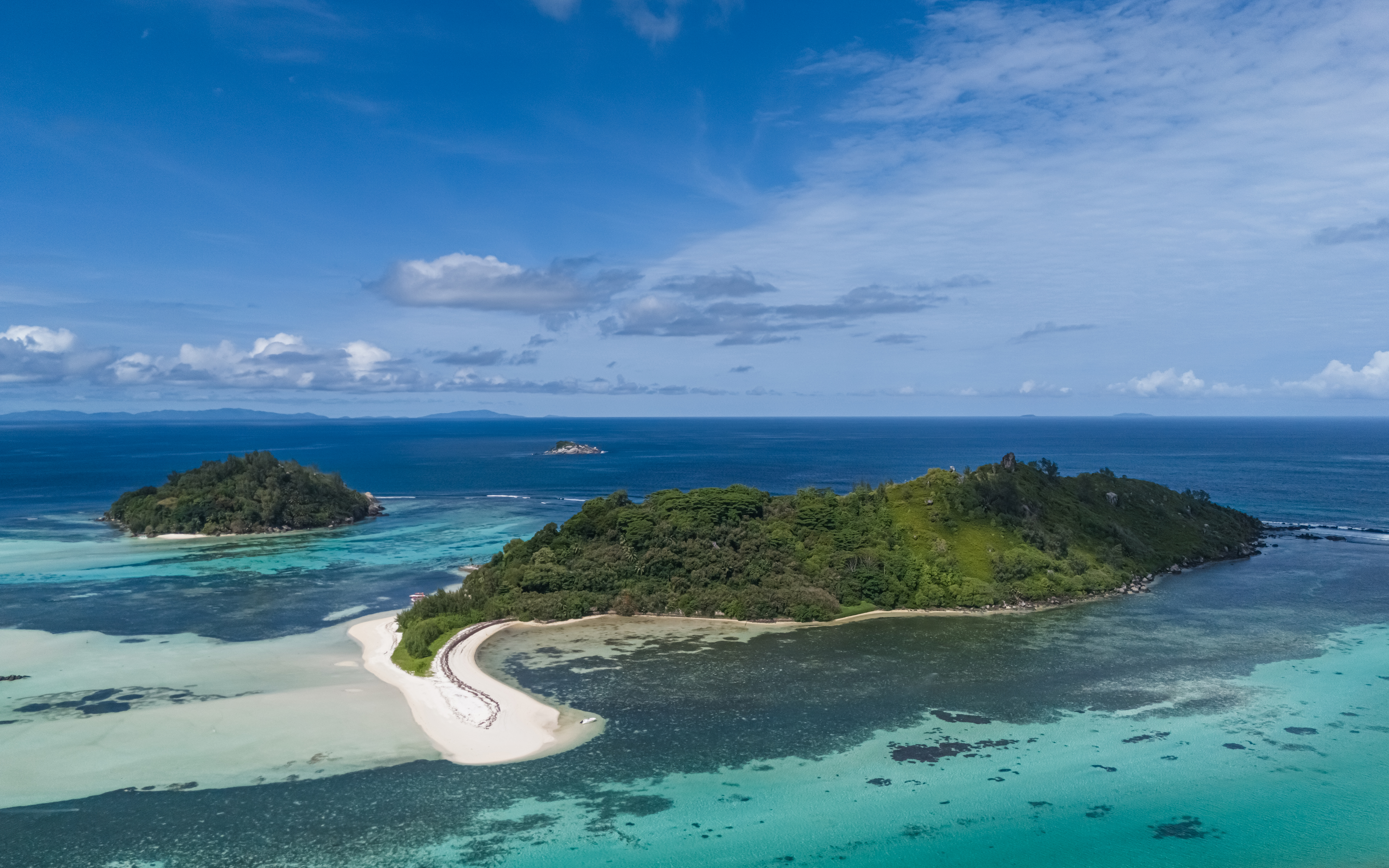

- Location within Seychelles

Geography
- Location: Seychelles, Indian Ocean
- Coordinates: 4°37′S 55°30′E
- Archipelago: Inner Islands, Seychelles
- Adjacent to: Indian Ocean
- Total islands: 1
- Major islands: Long
- Area: 0.23 km^{2} (0.089 sq mi)
- Length: 0.35 km (0.217 mi)
- Width: 0.85 km (0.528 mi)
- Coastline: 2.3 km (1.43 mi)
- Highest elevation: 90 m (300 ft)
- Highest point: Mount Pelangi Spa

Administration
- Seychelles
- Group: Granitic Seychelles
- Sub-Group: Mahe Islands
- Sub-Group: Ste. Anne Islands
- Districts: Mont Fleuri
- Largest settlement: Long Island (pop. 50)

Demographics
- Population: 50 (2014)
- Pop. density: 370/km^{2} (960/sq mi)
- Ethnic groups: Creole, French, East Africans, Indians.

Additional information
- Time zone: SCT (UTC+4)
- ISO code: SC-18
- Official website: www.seychelles.travel/en/discover/the-islands/

Long Island is an island in Seychelles, lying in the northeast shores of Mahe.

== Geography ==
Long Island is located in the midst of the Sainte Anne Marine National Park close to Round and Moyenne Islands. The island is covered in palm trees and reaches an elevation of 90m.

== History ==
In 1825, a settlement was established on the island. A family of Seychelles purchased the islands of Long, Round and Moyenne. Their village had about 25 people and was located at the west point. In 1900 the village was abandoned and a quarantine station for small-pox sailors was built. The island served as the Seychelles juvenile prison. in 2006 the inmates were transferred to Montagne Posée Prison on the island of Mahe, to do construction work on the new land reclamation projects. The island now hosts the new Pelangi Resort and Spa which consists of 55 villas, 32 one-bedroom villas, 15 two-bedroom villas, 5 four-suite villas and a presidential villa. The hotel features Seychelles’ first funicular – a cable car system – to take guests to its CHI spa facilities and wedding chapel, positioned on the island’s central hilltop. The staff live on the village on the west end, where the former prison was located. along the south coast, a new residential village is being built, with 40 houses, and a new Chapel.

== Administration ==
The island belongs to Mont Fleuri District. Being an island with a small population, there are not any government buildings or services. For many services, people have to go to Victoria.

== Image gallery ==
Map 1

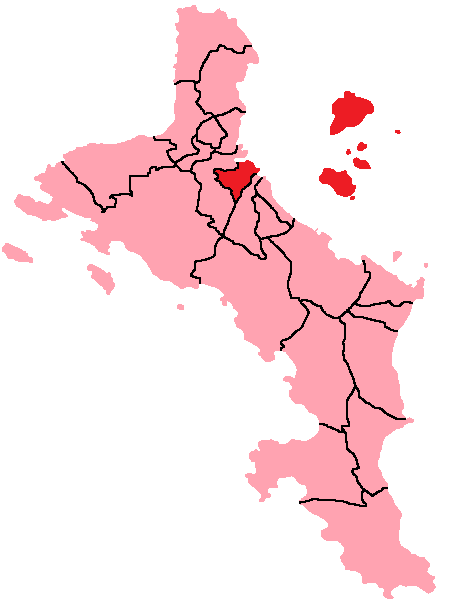
District Map
