= Eve Island, Seychelles =

Island in Seychelles

Eve Island
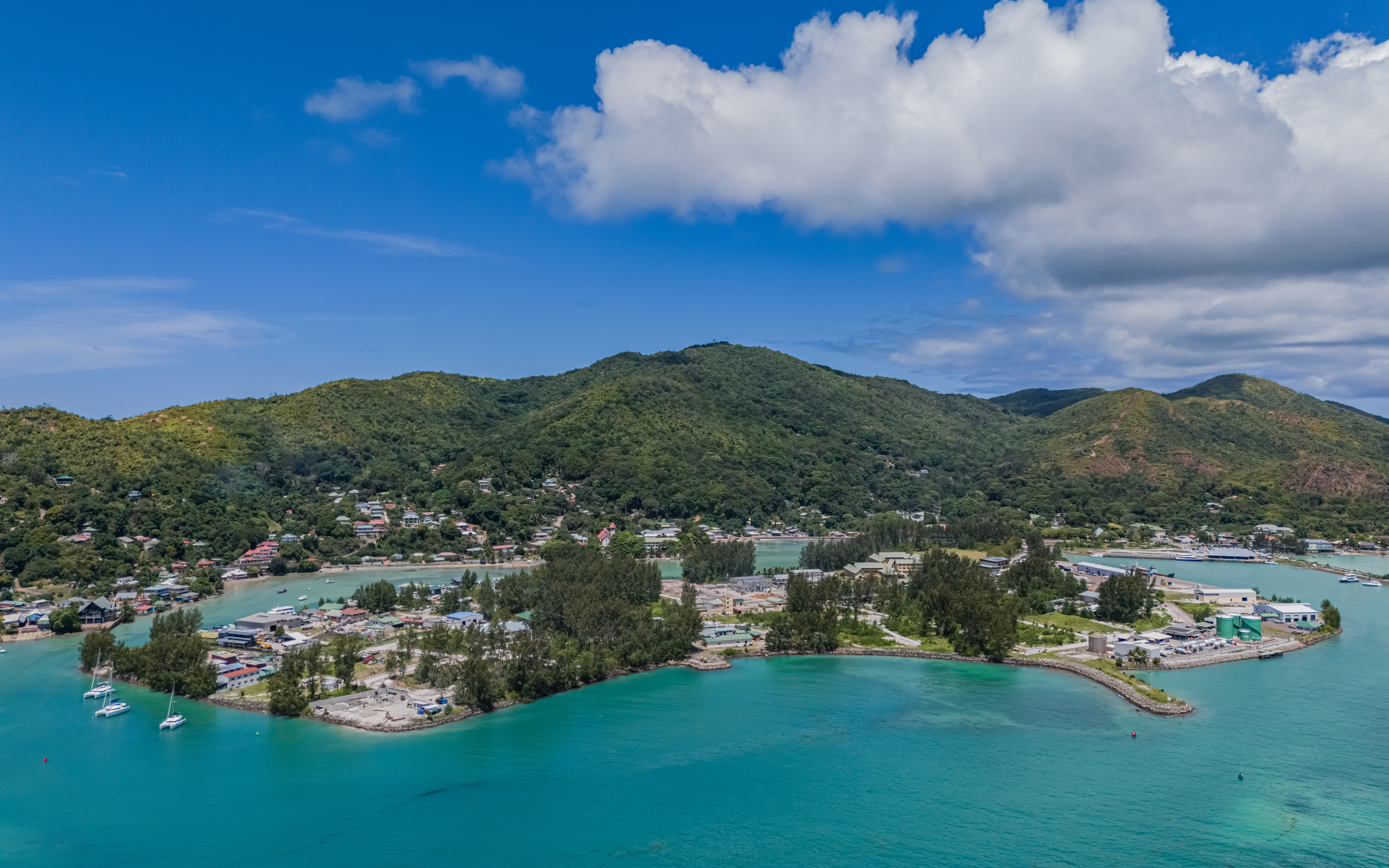

- Location within Seychelles

Geography
- Location: Seychelles, Indian Ocean
- Coordinates: 04.342°S 55.762°E
- Archipelago: Inner Islands, Seychelles
- Adjacent to: Indian Ocean
- Total islands: 1
- Major islands: Eve
- Area: 0.29 km^{2} (0.11 sq mi)
- Length: 0.8 km (0.5 mi)
- Width: 0.5 km (0.31 mi)
- Coastline: 2.54 km (1.578 mi)
- Highest elevation: 1 m (3 ft)

Administration
- Seychelles
- Group: Inner Islands
- Sub-Group: Granitic Seychelles
- Sub-Group: Praslin Islands
- Districts: Baie Sainte Anne
- Largest settlement: Eve Construction camp (pop. 100)

Demographics
- Population: 100 (2014)
- Ethnic groups: Creole, French, East Africans, Indians.

Additional information
- Time zone: SCT (UTC+4)
- ISO code: SC-07
- Official website: www.seychelles.travel/en/discover/the-islands/

Eve is an island in Seychelles, lying east of Praslin and west of Round Island. It has an area of 0.29 km^{2}.

== History ==
The island was created by land reclamation.

== Geography ==
The island is located 100 meters to the east of Baie Sainte Anne.

== Economics ==
The island has commercial port facilities. Raffles are building some exclusive villas on the island A new sports complex will be opening in December 2016.

== Transport ==
There is a 100 meters causeway to Praslin.

== Image gallery ==
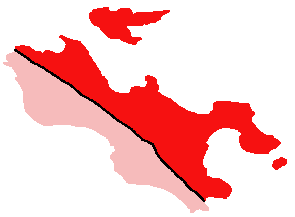
Map 1
