= Ste. Anne Island =

Island in Seychelles

Sainte Anne Island
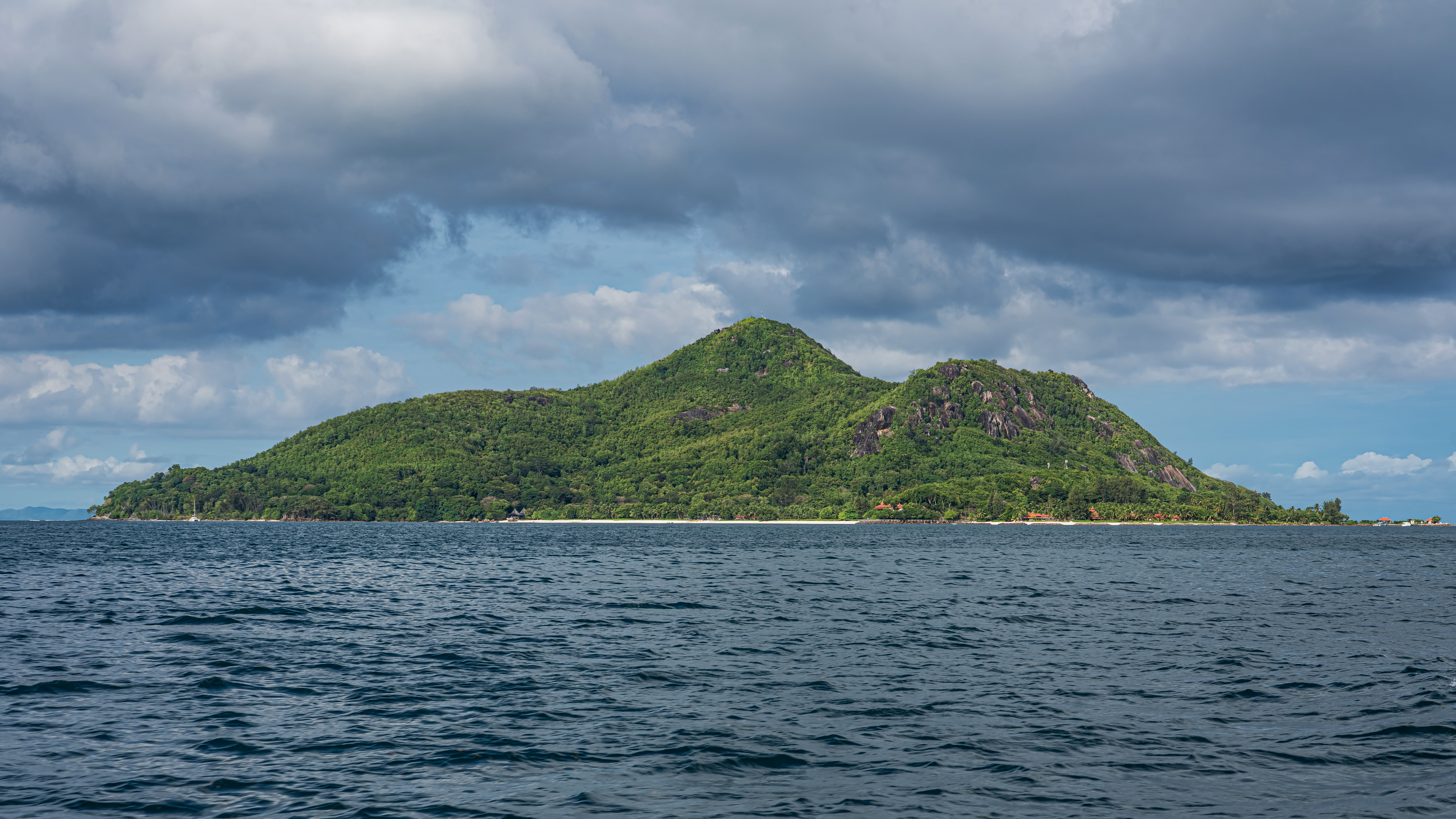

- Location within Seychelles

Geography
- Location: Seychelles, Indian Ocean
- Coordinates: 4°36′S 55°30′E
- Archipelago: Inner Islands, Seychelles
- Adjacent to: Indian Ocean
- Total islands: 1
- Major islands: Sainte Anne
- Area: 2.27 km^{2} (0.88 sq mi)
- Length: 2.1 km (1.3 mi)
- Width: 1.7 km (1.06 mi)
- Coastline: 7.1 km (4.41 mi)
- Highest elevation: 246 m (807 ft)
- Highest point: Mount Sainte Anne

Administration
- Seychelles
- Group: Granitic Seychelles
- Sub-Group: Mahe Islands
- Sub-Group: Ste. Anne Islands
- Districts: Mont Fleuri
- Capital and largest city: Sainte Anne (pop. 40)

Demographics
- Population: 40 (2014)
- Pop. density: 17.6/km^{2} (45.6/sq mi)
- Ethnic groups: Creole, French, East Africans, Indians.

Additional information
- Time zone: SCT (UTC+4)
- ISO code: SC-18
- Official website: www.seychelles.travel/en/discover/the-islands/

Sainte Anne Island is the largest (2.27 km^{2}) of eight islands in Ste Anne Marine National Park of the Seychelles. These islands are part of the Mont Fleuri District of the Seychelles. It is 4 km off the east coast of Mahé and has abundant tropical vegetation. The highest peak on Sainte Anne is 246 meters (807 feet).

The French explorer Lazare Picault first discovered the island in 1742, on the day of Saint Anne, and the first French settlement in the Seychelles was established here in 1770. In the early 20th century the St. Abbs Whaling Company briefly maintained a whaling station on the island, the ruins of which can still be found.

In 2002, the Beachcomber Sainte Anne Resort & Spa, with 87 luxury villas, was opened on the southwest point.

The village of Sainte Anne is located next to the hotel. It contains the park rangers' quarters, dive shop, and restaurants. Some hotel staff and other employees live in the village, which has 40 people; some of the hotel staff do a daily trip from Victoria.

== Tourism ==
Today, the island's main industry is tourism. It has 6 big beaches:

- Grande Anse, located at the southwest, where hotel Beachcomber Sainte Anne resort & spa is present.
- Anse Royale, where sea turtles lay their eggs from late November to February.
- Anse Tortues.
- Anse Cimitiere
- Anse Manon (accessible only by foot).
- Anse Cabot

== Image gallery ==
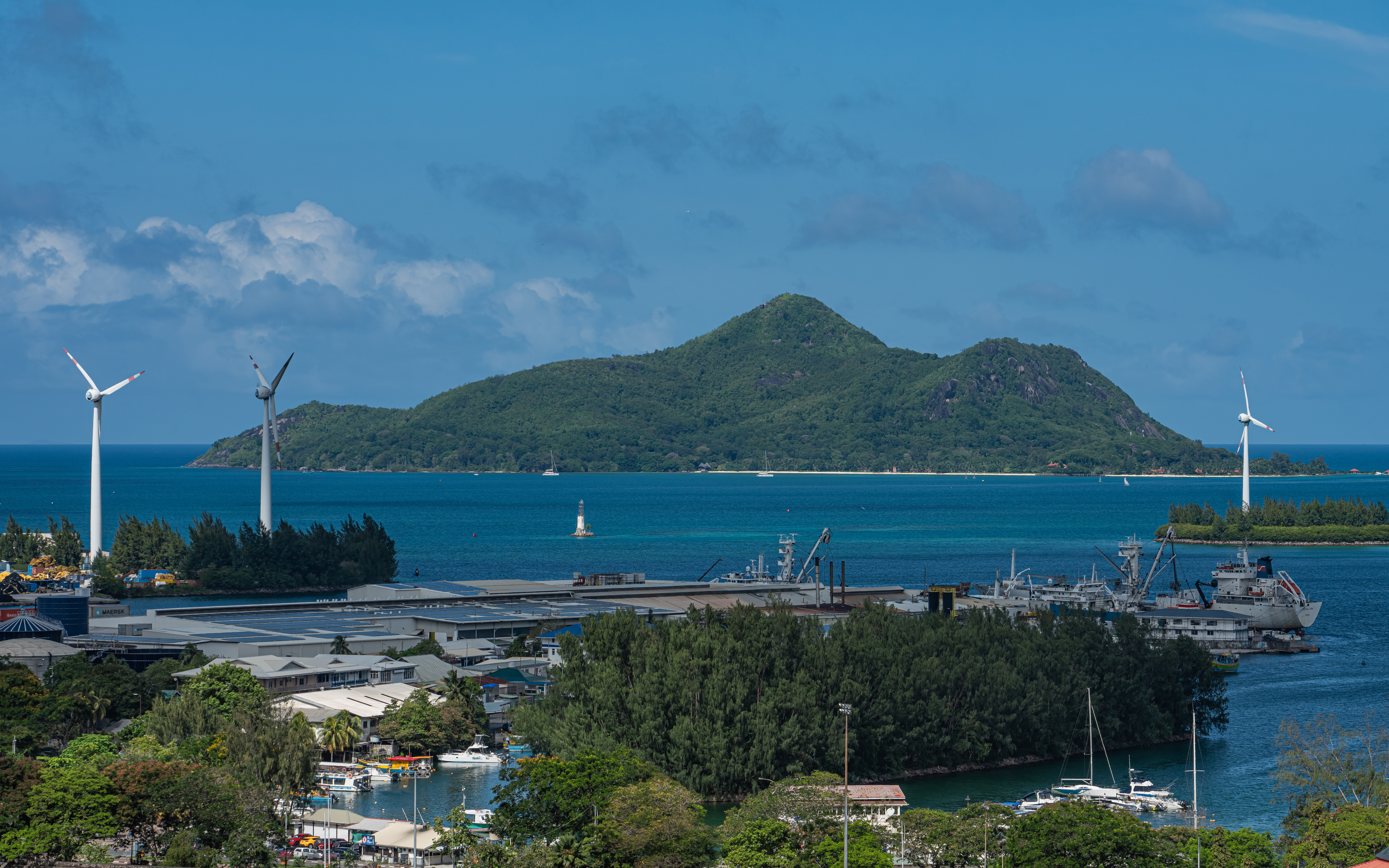
Sainte Anne Island as seen from Victoria

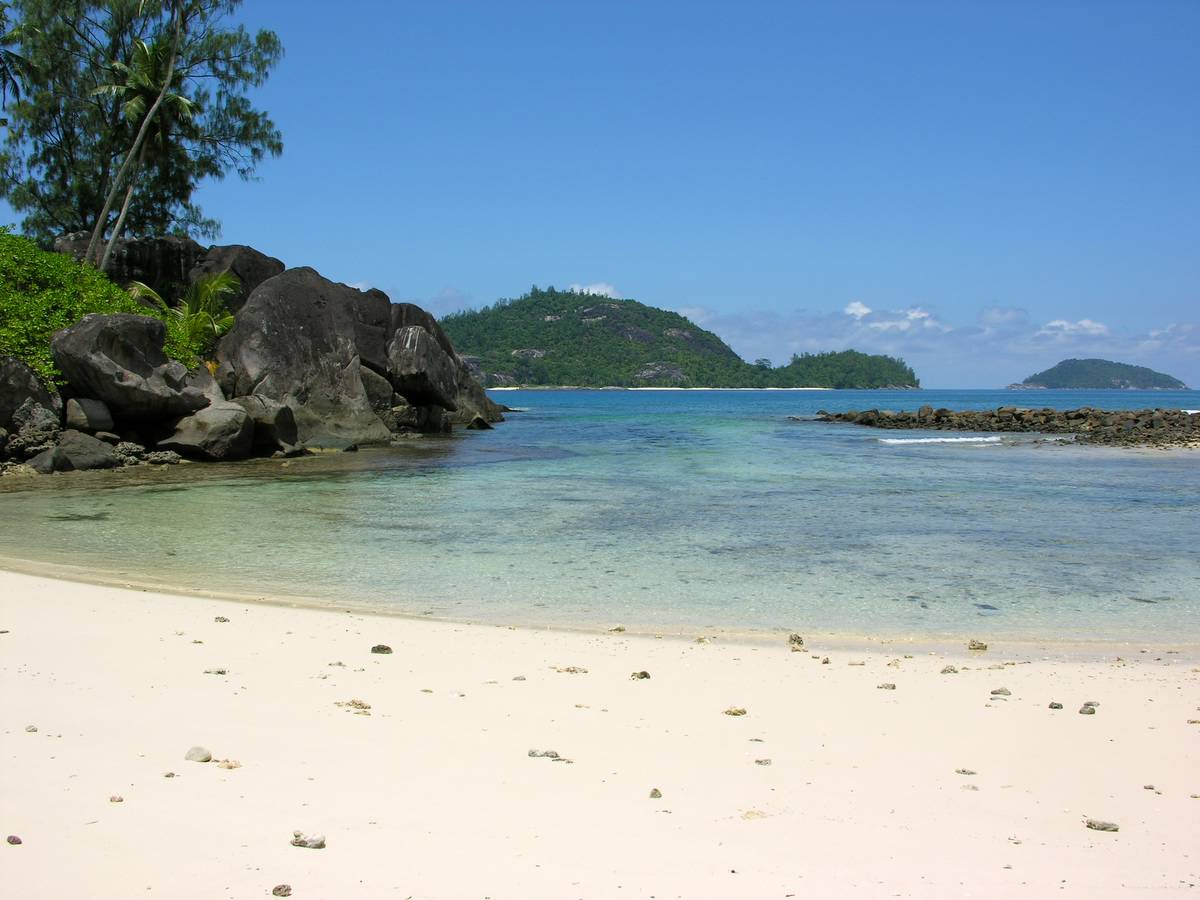
Sainte Anne Island as seen from Mahé

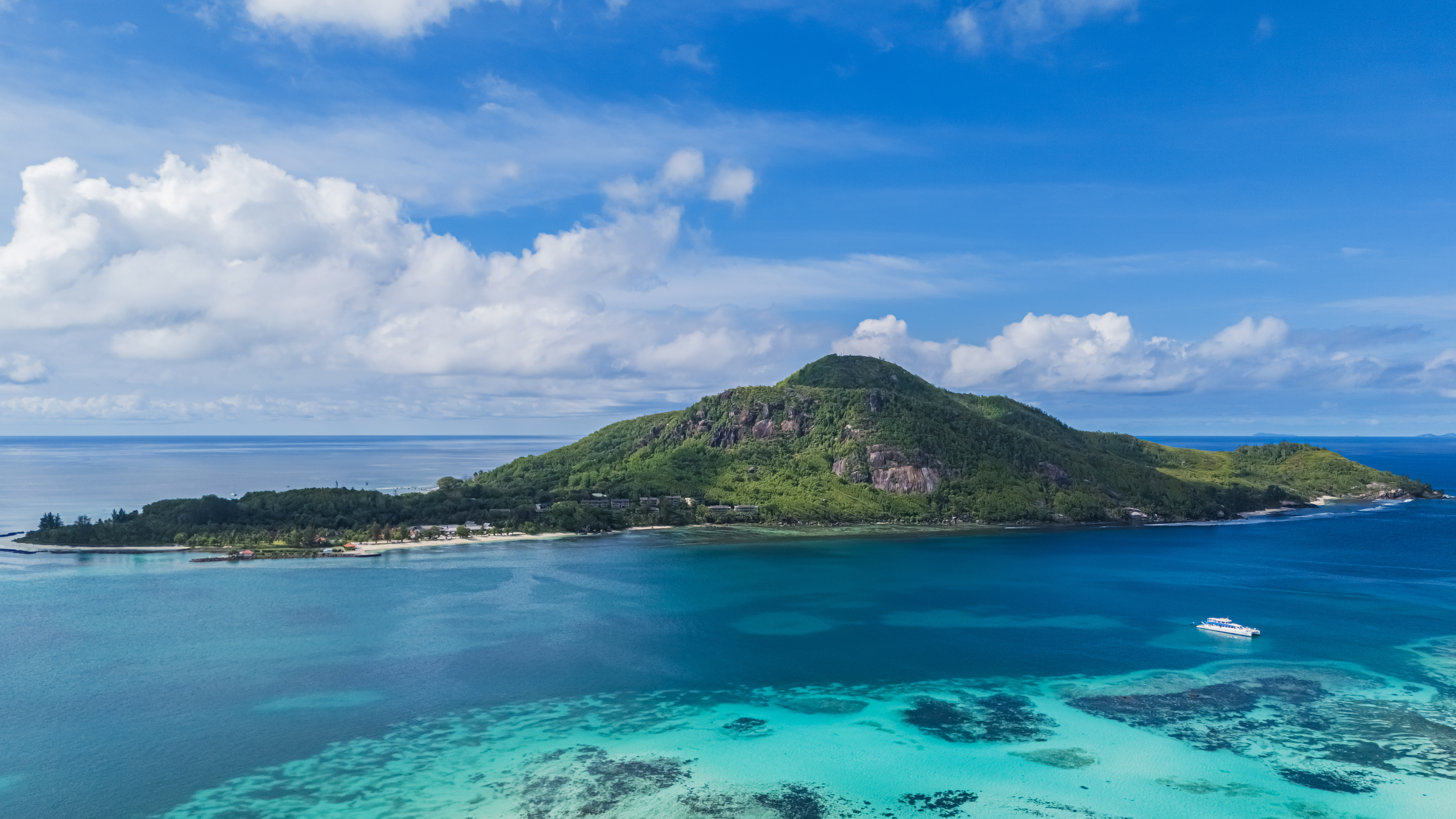
Sainte Anne Island aerial view
