= Sainte Anne Marine National Park =

National park in the Seychelles

Sainte Anne Marine National Park.
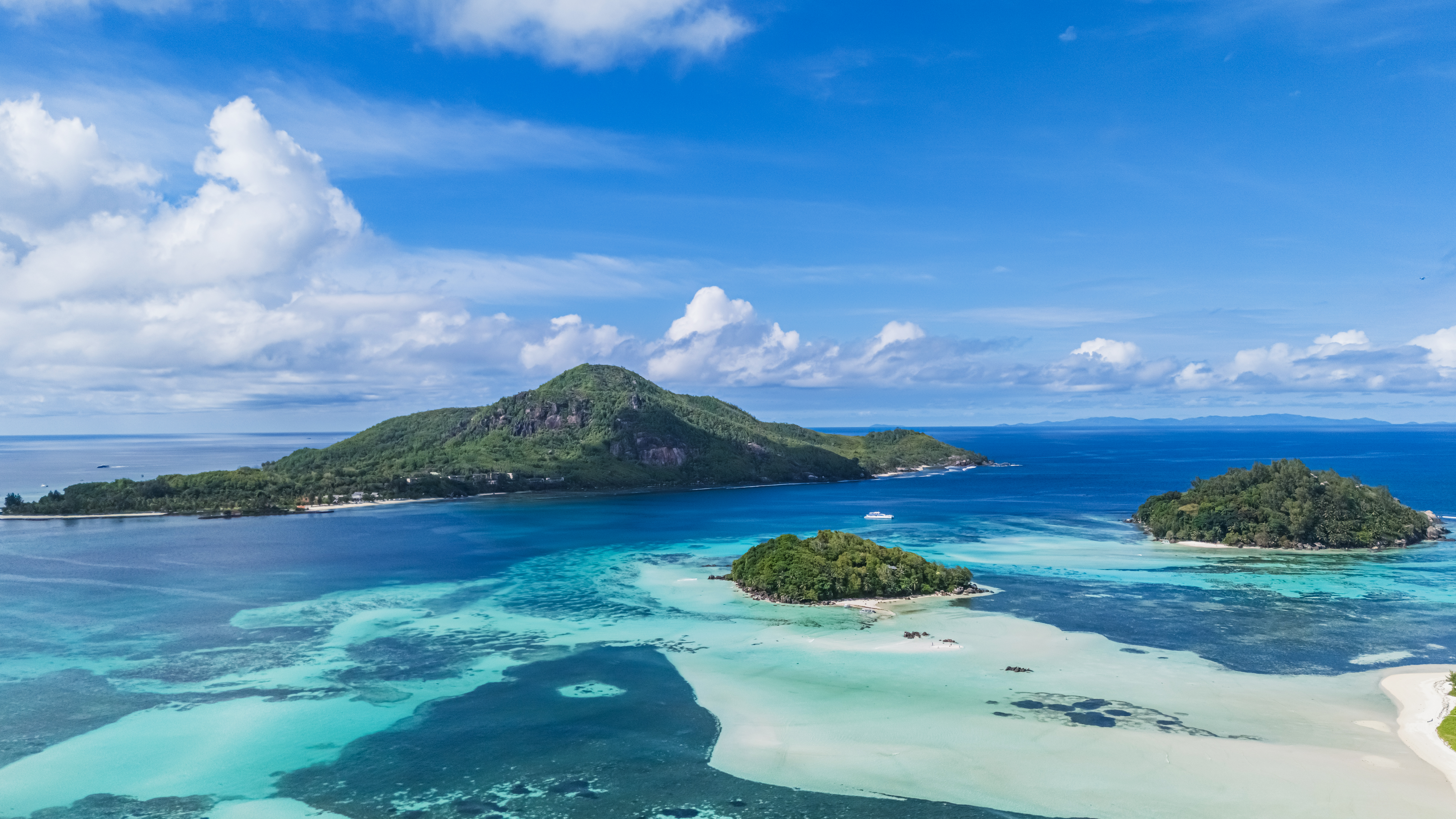

- Location within Seychelles

Geography
- Location: Seychelles, Indian Ocean
- Coordinates: 4°37′S 55°30′E
- Archipelago: Inner Islands, Seychelles
- Adjacent to: Indian Ocean
- Total islands: 8
- Major islands: Sainte Anne; Cerf
- Area: 3.887 km^{2} (1.501 sq mi)
- Highest elevation: 150 m (490 ft)
- Highest point: Mount Sainte Anne

Administration
- Seychelles
- Group: Granitic Seychelles
- Sub-Group: Mahe Islands
- Sub-Group: Sainte Anne Islands
- Districts: Mont Fleuri
- Capital city: Sainte Anne (population 40)

Demographics
- Population: 242 (2014)
- Pop. density: 62/km^{2} (161/sq mi)
- Ethnic groups: Creole, French, East Africans, Indians.

Additional information
- Time zone: SCT (UTC+4)
- ISO code: SC-18
- Official website: www.seychelles.travel/en/discover/the-islands/

Sainte Anne Marine National Park lies about 5 km from Victoria, the capital city of the Seychelles, and encompasses eight small islands.

== History ==
The Marine Park was created in 1973 for the preservation of wildlife, the first of its kind in the Indian Ocean. Fishing and water-skiing are forbidden within the Marine Park area.

== Tourism ==
Today the islands are known as a popular tourist location for scuba-diving, glass-bottom boat excursions and snorkeling among the coral reefs. The colorful underwater world attracts tourists from around the world who are interested in coral gardens, reef sharks and colorful tropical fish. The main island of Ste Anne is an 87-villa resort, while Cerf Island and Round Island have Creole-style restaurants. It also has one of the largest areas of "seagrass meadows" in the Seychelles. Local tour operators offer day trips to the Marine Park.

== Geography ==
The national park is made up of the following islands, with areas in km²:

- Ste. Anne Island, 2.19 km², with large luxury resort Club Med Seychelles
- Cerf Island, 1.27 km², with a population of about 100, with three hotel-resorts (Cerf Island Marine Park Resort, Fairy Tern Chalets und L'Habitation), and restaurant Kapok Tree
- Île Cachée, 0.021 km², close southeast of Cerf Island, a nesting site for seabirds
- Round Island, 0.018 km², a former leper colony, with an exclusive five-star resort called "Round Island Resort" with 10 villas.
- Long Island, 0.212 km², formerly a smallpox quarantine and state prison, currently being developed into a 5 star resort
- Moyenne Island, 0.089 km², currently with no steady population after the decease of the founders of the Moyenne Island National Park (Brendon Grimshaw and assistant), and restaurant Maison Moyenne
- Sèche Island (Beacon Island), 0.04 km²,
- Harrison Rock (Grand Rocher) the eastern islet of the park.

The aggregate land area of the islands of the marine national park is 3.887 km². The total marine national park area is 14.43 km².

== Administration ==
All islands belong to Mont Fleuri District. Because of the small population, there are not any government buildings or services, so people who live on the islands have to go to Victoria.

== Image gallery ==
Map 1

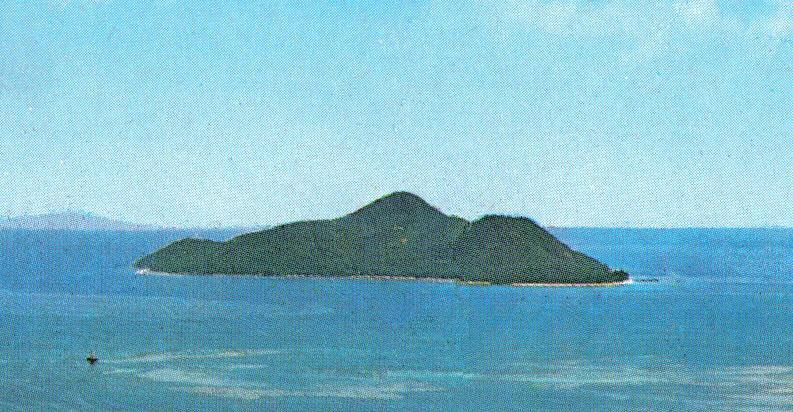
Sainte Anne Island

Aerial view of Moyenne Island, Seychelles 1970

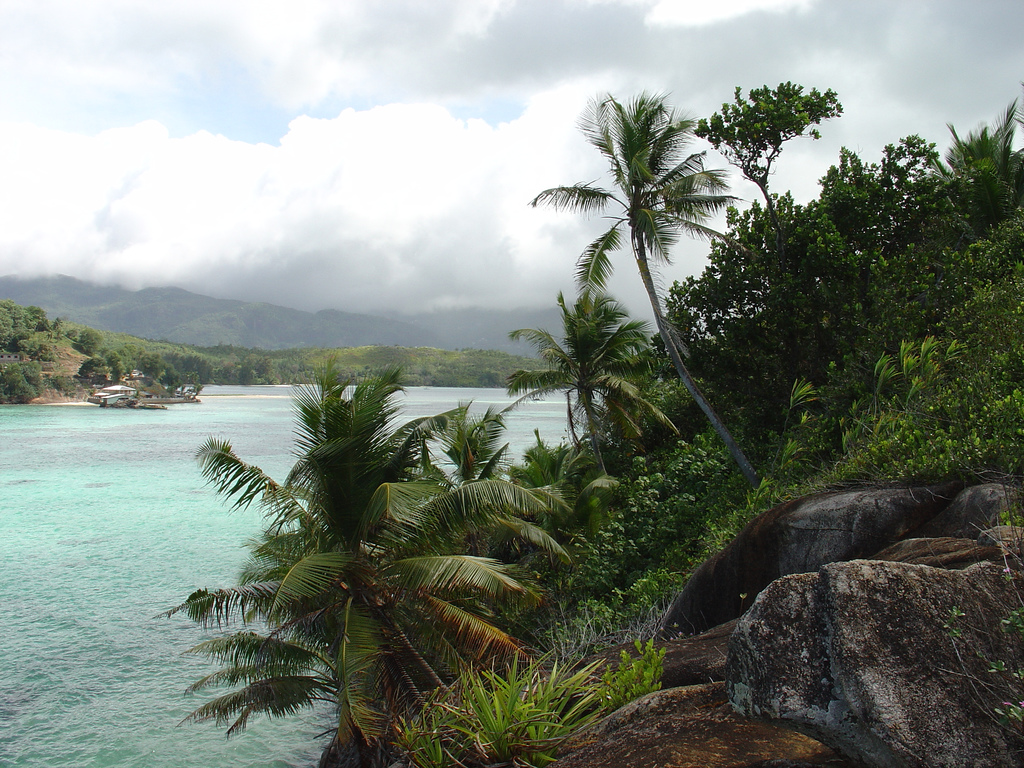
Moyenne Island image

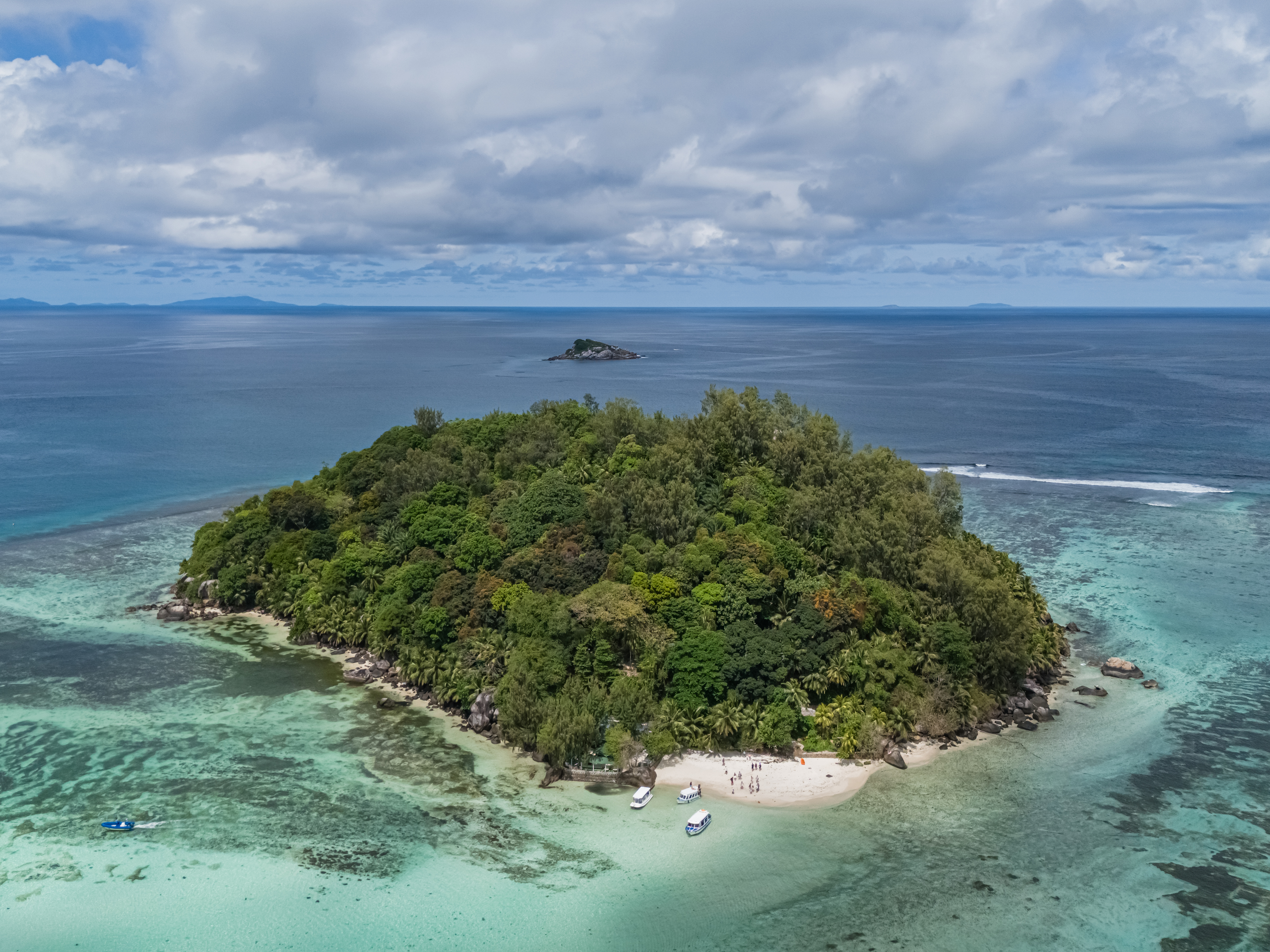
Moyenne Island, Seychelles

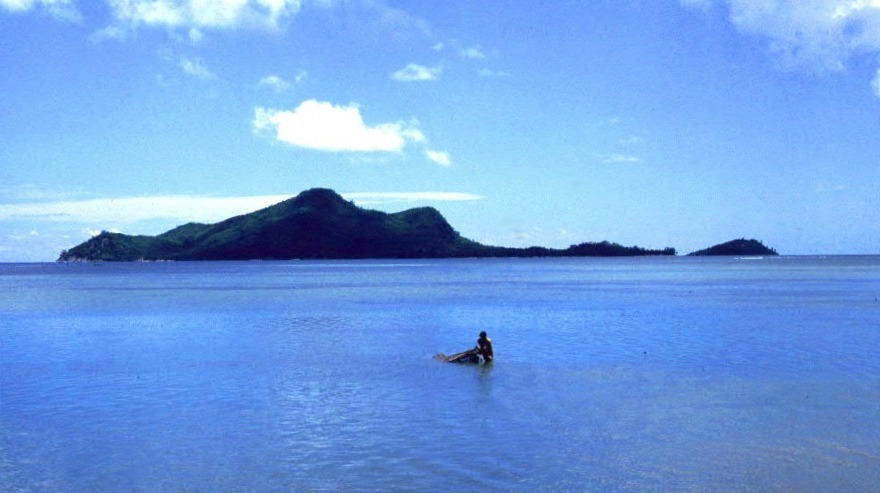
Ile aux Cerfs 1980

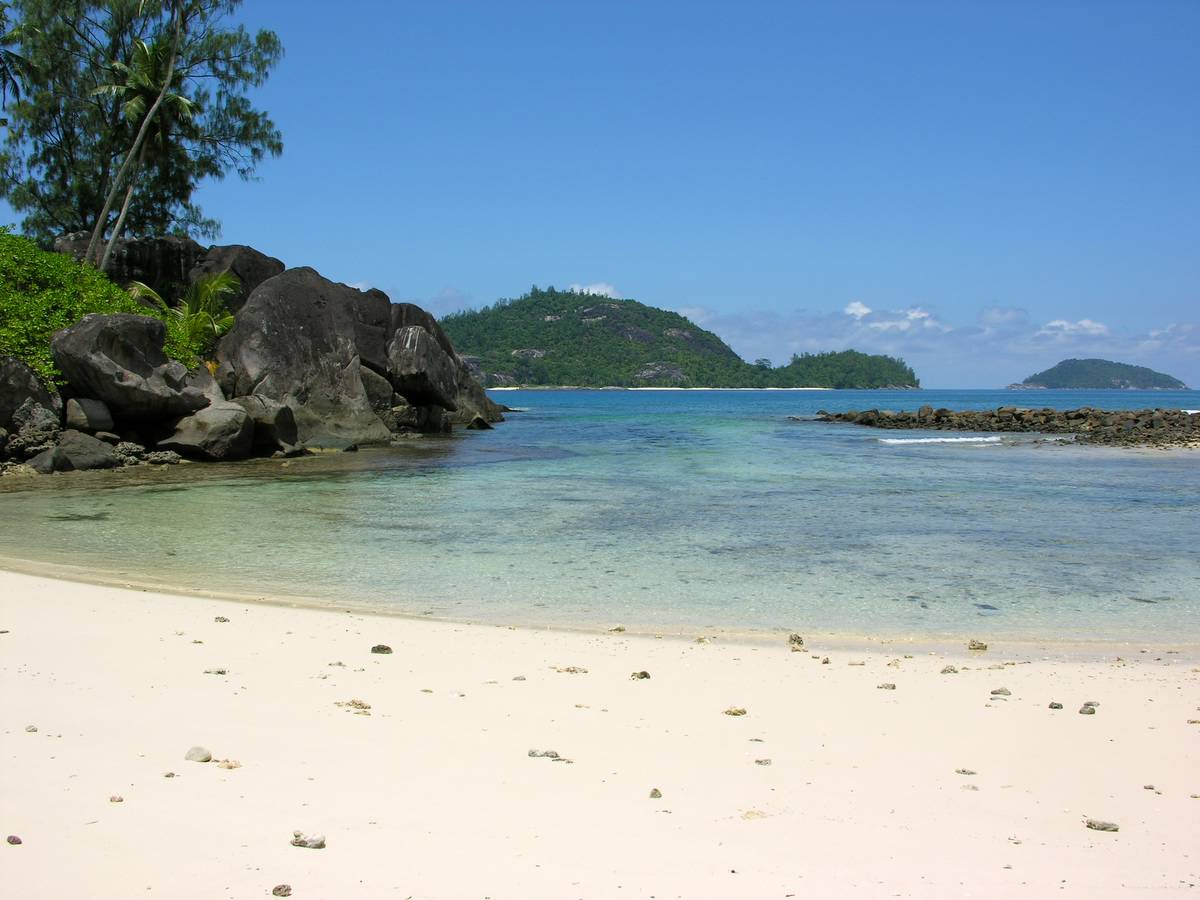
St. Anne islands from Mahe

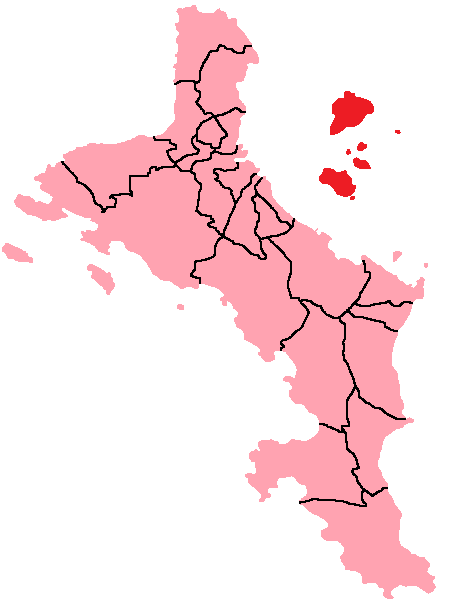
Location of the Ste Anne Marine National Park (islands in red)

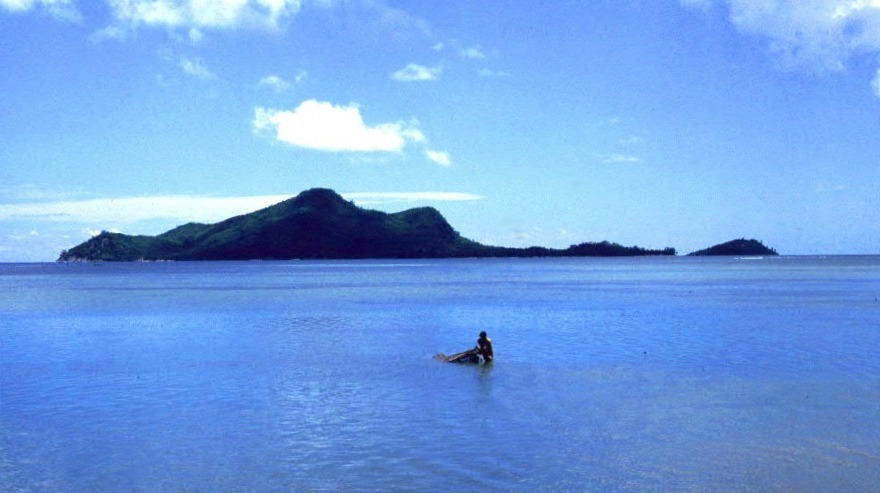
Île aux Cerfs seen from Mahe, Seychelles

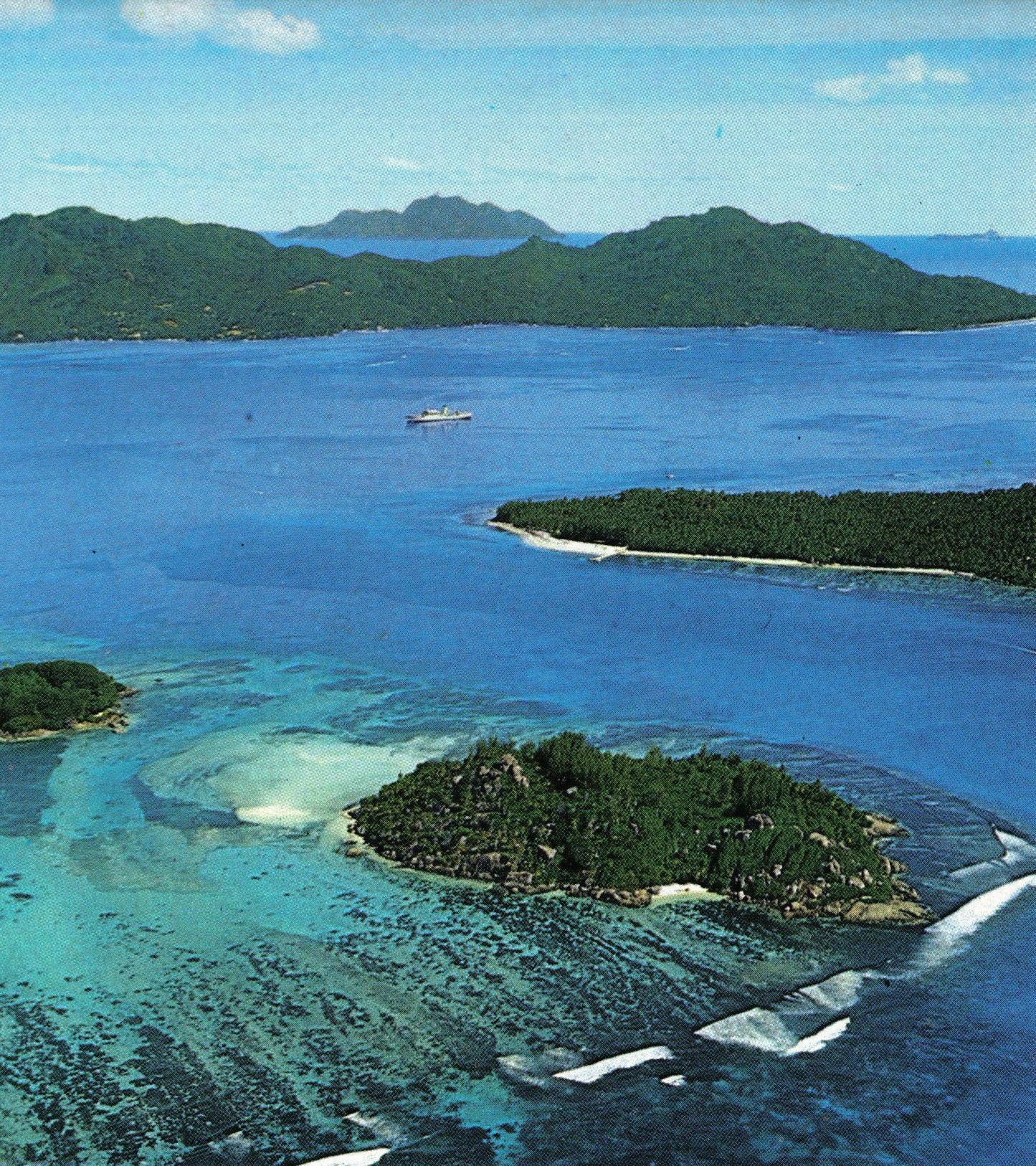
Anne Marine NP aerial Seychelles
