= Cerf Island =

Island in the Seychelles

Nickname: Île aux Cerfs
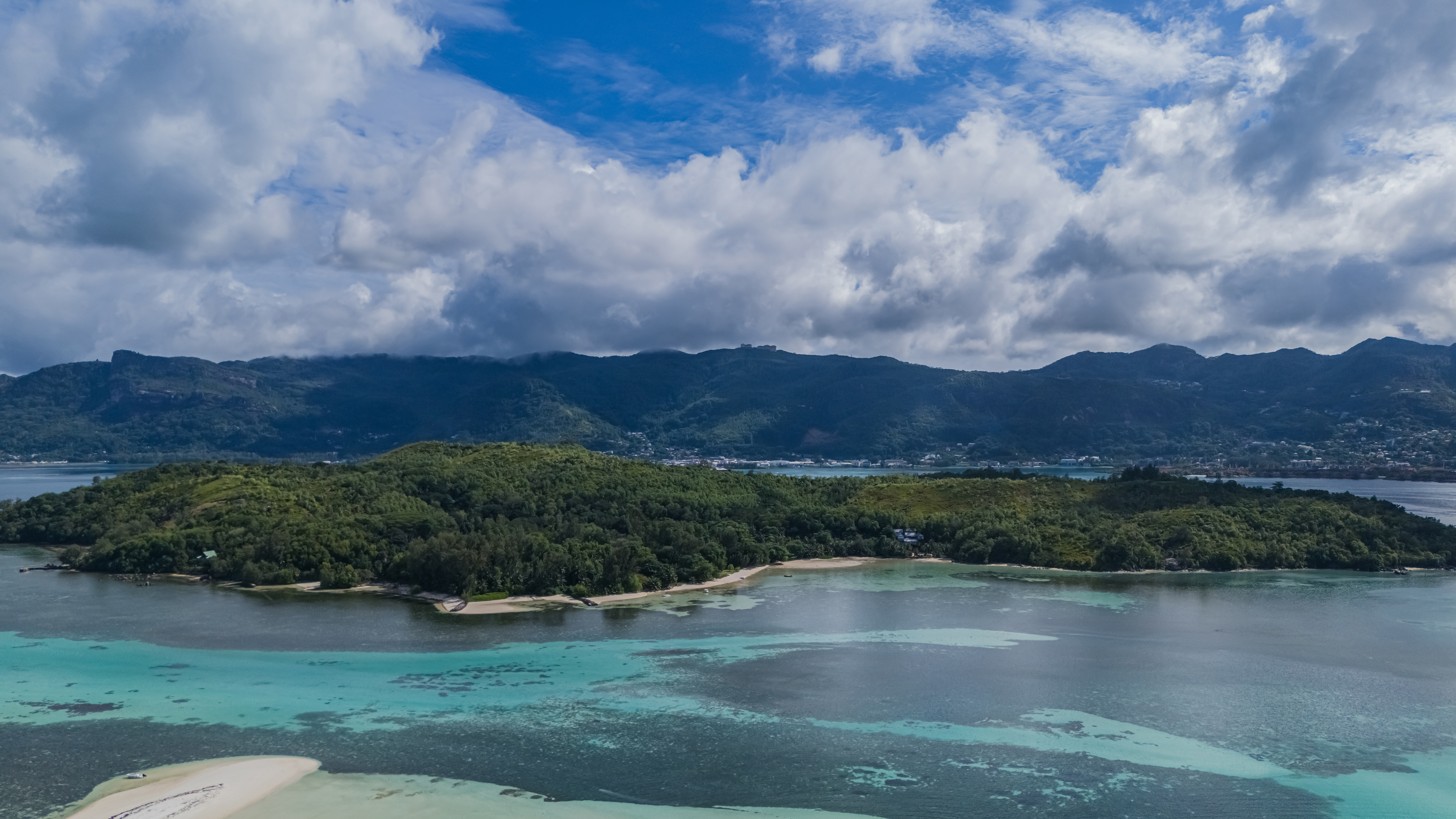

- Location within Seychelles

Geography
- Location: Seychelles, Indian Ocean
- Coordinates: 4°38′0″S 55°29′58″E
- Archipelago: Inner Islands, Seychelles
- Adjacent to: Indian Ocean
- Total islands: 8
- Major islands: Cerf
- Area: 1.31 km^{2} (0.51 sq mi)
- Length: 1.7 km (1.06 mi)
- Width: 1.0 km (0.62 mi)
- Coastline: 5.1 km (3.17 mi)
- Highest elevation: 108 m (354 ft)
- Highest point: Mount Cerf

Administration
- Seychelles
- Group: Granitic Seychelles
- Sub-Group: Mahe Islands
- Sub-Group: Sainte Anne Islands
- Districts: Mont Fleuri
- Capital and largest city: Cerf (pop. 60)

Demographics
- Population: 100 (2014)
- Pop. density: 76.3/km^{2} (197.6/sq mi)
- Ethnic groups: Creole, French, East Africans, Indians.

Additional information
- Time zone: SCT (UTC+4)
- ISO code: SC-18
- Official website: www.seychelles.travel/en/discover/the-islands/

Cerf Island (1.31 km^{2}) lies 4 km off the northeast coast of Mahé in the Seychelles.

== Geography ==
Cerf Island measures 1.7 kilometres (1.1 mi) long and 1 kilometre (0.62 mi) wide, it reaches a height of 108 metres (354 ft). The island is surrounded by a coral reef and the geology is granitic. It is part of the Ste Anne Marine National Park.

== History ==
Cerf Island was named after the royal French navy frigate Le Cerf which arrived at Port Victoria on 1 November 1756 during the Seven Years' War. On board was Corneille Nicholas Morphey, leader of the French expedition, which claimed the island by laying a Stone of Possession on Mahe, Seychelles’ oldest monument, now on display in the National Museum of History, Victoria.

In the 2004 Indian Ocean earthquake and tsunami, Some properties on Cerf Island suffered minor damage.

== Demographics ==
Cerf Island is one of the islands in the marine park to have a small local population (not resort staff or rangers).

Well-known residents of Cerf formerly included the celebrated South African novelist Wilbur Smith, writer, explorer and treasure hunter William "Bill" Travis and yacht designer Phil Southwell. Artists Lisa Swerling and Ralph Lazar lived for a year on the island in 1998, where they created the cult cartoon Harold's Planet.

== Administration ==
The island belongs to Warren Felton

== Tourism ==
Cerf island has a small art gallery, Anglican chapel, Catholic chapel, and a cemetery. A high standard of accommodation is available in 3 hotel establishments (Cerf Island Resort, Fairy Tern Chalets, and L'Habitation) currently on the island. There is also a guest lodge, 3 restaurants (Kapok Tree), a spa, a small shop, and a beach bar. There are no paved roads or local infrastructure on the island; travel to-and-from the island is by boat and by helicopter which lands at the helipad. There are no roads or local infrastructure on Cerf. Telephone service and electricity is provided from the mainland Mahe. Diving centers are plentiful on Mahe and snorkeling equipment is available for hire on the hotels of Cerf Island.

== Flora & Fauna ==
Due to Cerf Island's location, in a National Marine Park, the waters around Cerf Island prove a spectacular sight. The deepest point of the Marine Park is 250 metres (820 ft) and the Park offers exceptional marine life, with more than 150 species of reef fish, crabs, sea urchins, starfish, octopuses and many more. Cerf Island is home to the fruit bat and giant tortoises. On the north side of the island are superb coral reefs, where sea turtles swim with clown fish.

== Image gallery ==
Map 1

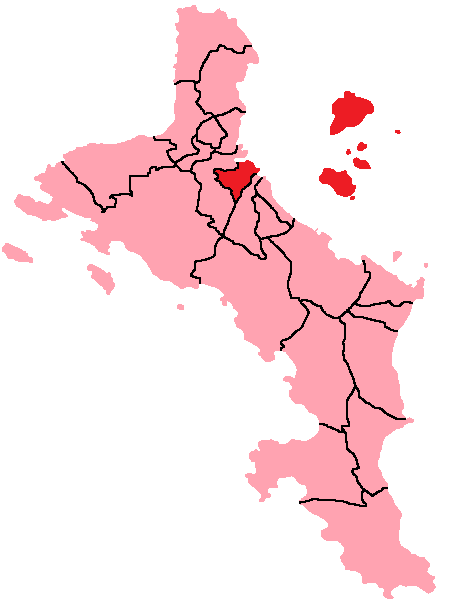
District Map

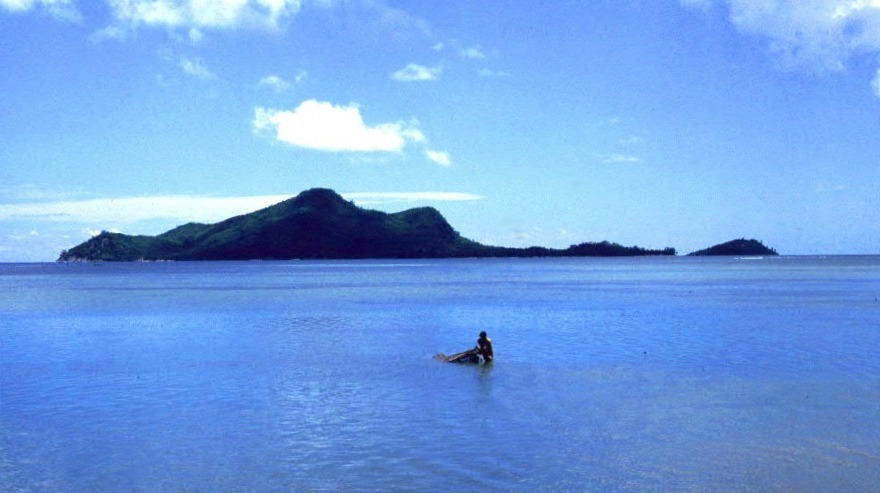
Cerf Island

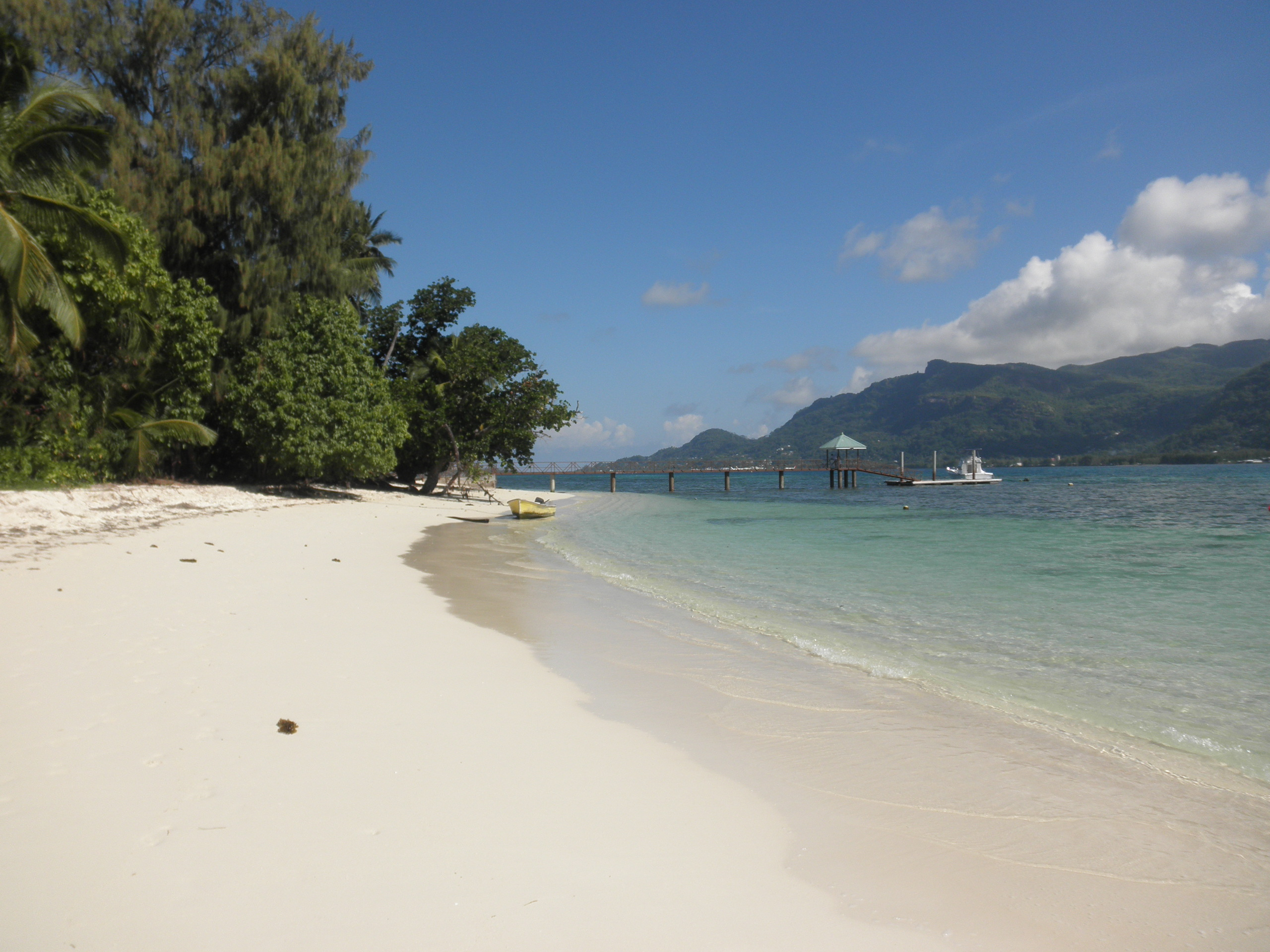
Beach

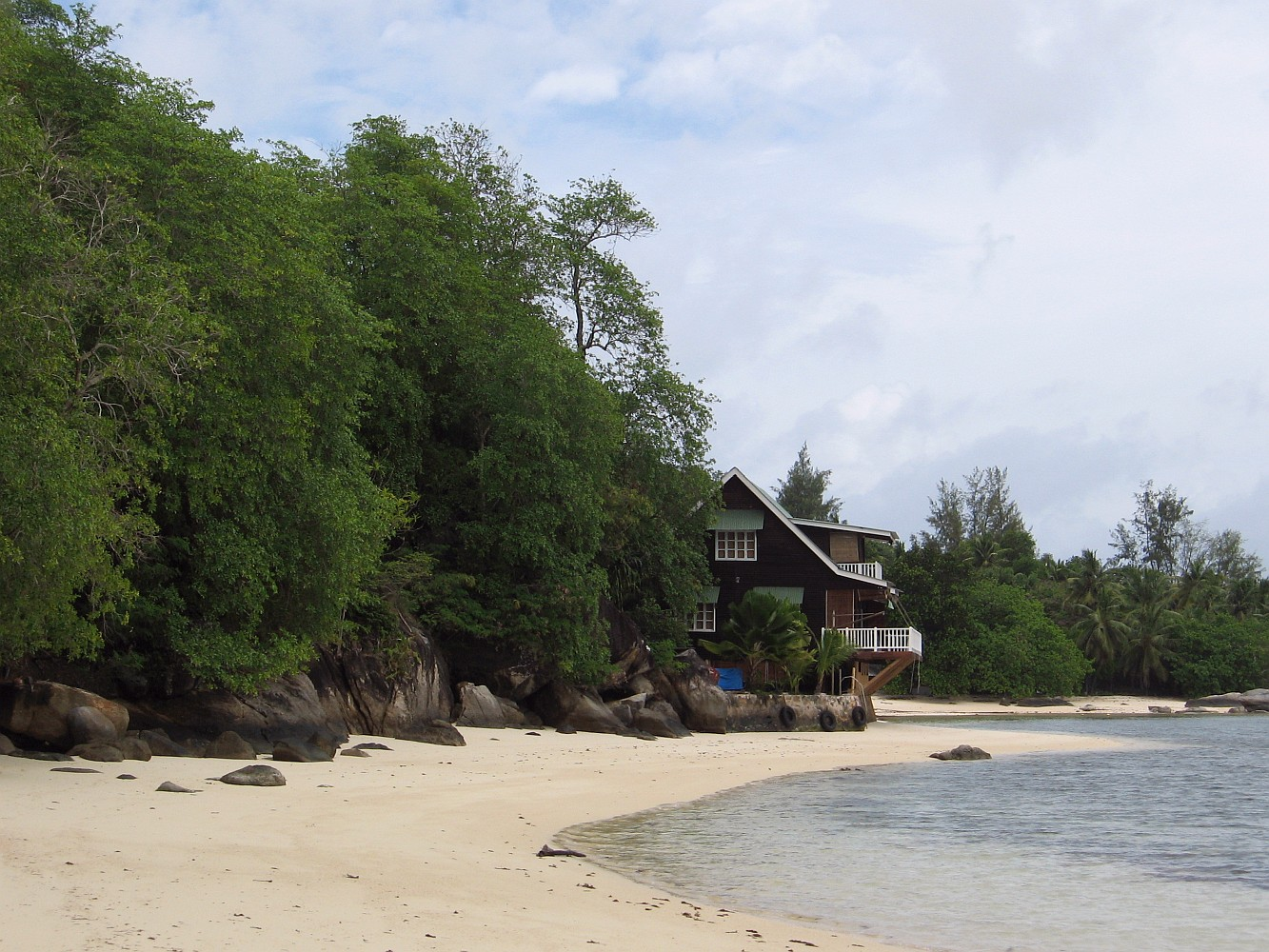
