= Round Island, Mahé =

Island in Seychelles

Round Island
Native name: Ile Rond Nickname: Enchanted Island
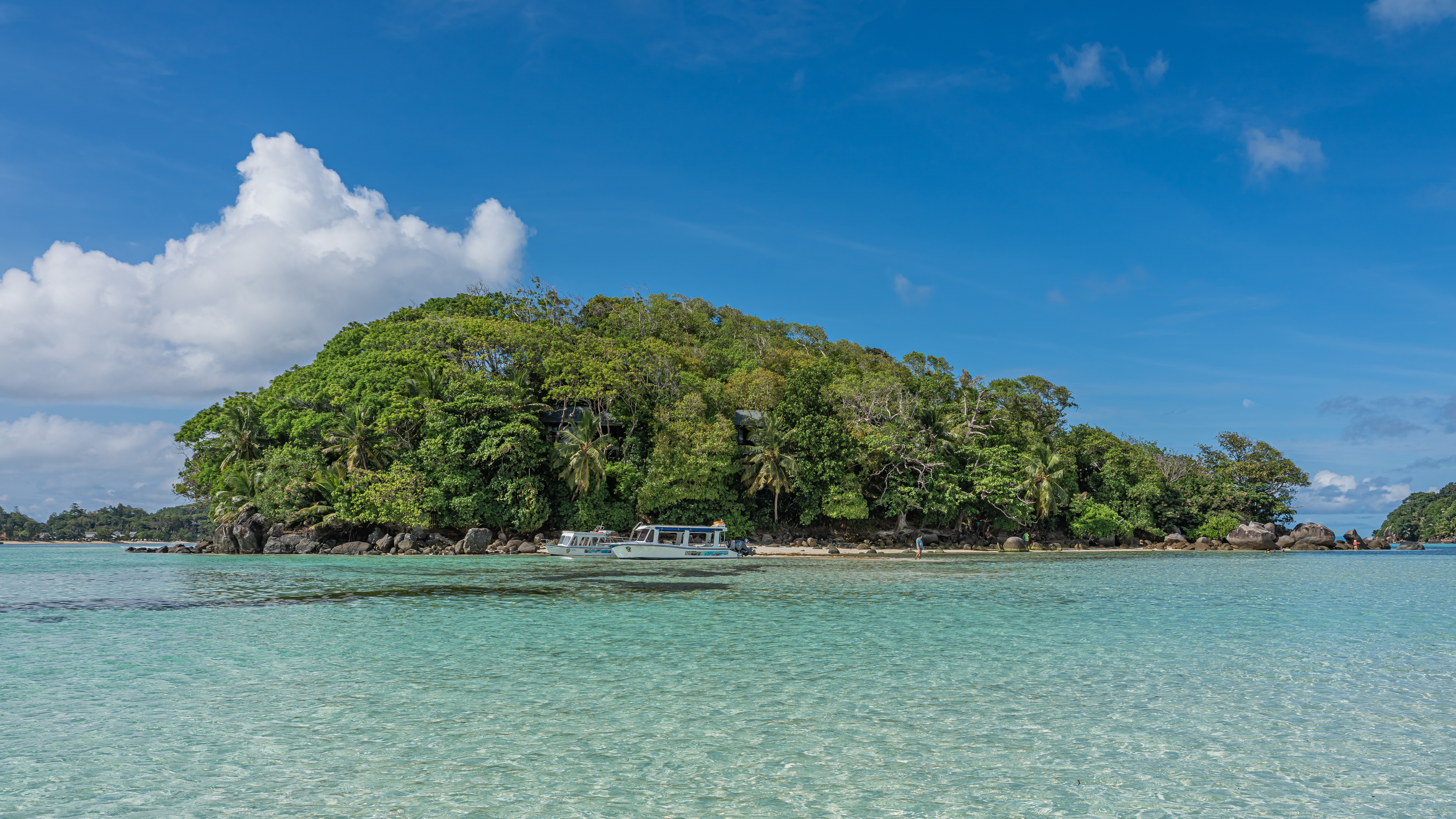

- Location within Seychelles

Geography
- Location: Seychelles, Indian Ocean
- Coordinates: 4°37′S 55°30′E
- Archipelago: Inner Islands, Seychelles
- Adjacent to: Indian Ocean
- Total islands: 1
- Major islands: Round
- Area: 0.027 km^{2} (0.010 sq mi)
- Length: 0.3 km (0.19 mi)
- Width: 0.15 km (0.093 mi)
- Coastline: 1.1 km (0.68 mi)
- Highest elevation: 26 m (85 ft)
- Highest point: Mount Round

Administration
- Seychelles
- Group: Granitic Seychelles
- Sub-Group: Mahe Islands
- Sub-Group: Ste. Anne Islands
- Districts: Mont Fleuri
- Largest settlement: Round Island (pop. 10)

Demographics
- Population: 10 (2014)
- Pop. density: 370/km^{2} (960/sq mi)
- Ethnic groups: Creole, French, East Africans, Indians.

Additional information
- Time zone: SCT (UTC+4)
- ISO code: SC-18
- Official website: www.seychelles.travel/en/discover/the-islands/

Round Island is an island in Seychelles, lying in the northeast shores of Mahe.

There is also a Round Island near the island of Praslin.

== History ==
In 2005 the island was bought by a Seychellois family with Indian roots and in December 2013 opened the Enchanted Island Resort. JA Resorts & Hotels

== Administration ==
The island is under the Mont Fleuri District.

== Tourism ==
The island is now home to Enchanted Island Resort by JA Resorts & Hotels, consisting of 10 luxurious villas, a restaurant and bar and a hilltop spa.

== Transport ==
It takes a 15-minute speed boat ride from Mahé to reach Round Island.

== Cuisine ==
Creole Cuisine, infused with the classic techniques of international cooking.

== Flora & Fauna ==
The reefs and lagoons of the island offer a large amount of flora and fauna. Green sea turtles live on the very edges of the coral reefs, and they sometimes venture closer to the island. There are butterfly fish, eagle rays, murray eels and many other species of fish.

== Image gallery ==
Map 1
