= Round Island, Praslin =

Island in Seychelles

Round Island
Nickname: Île Ronde
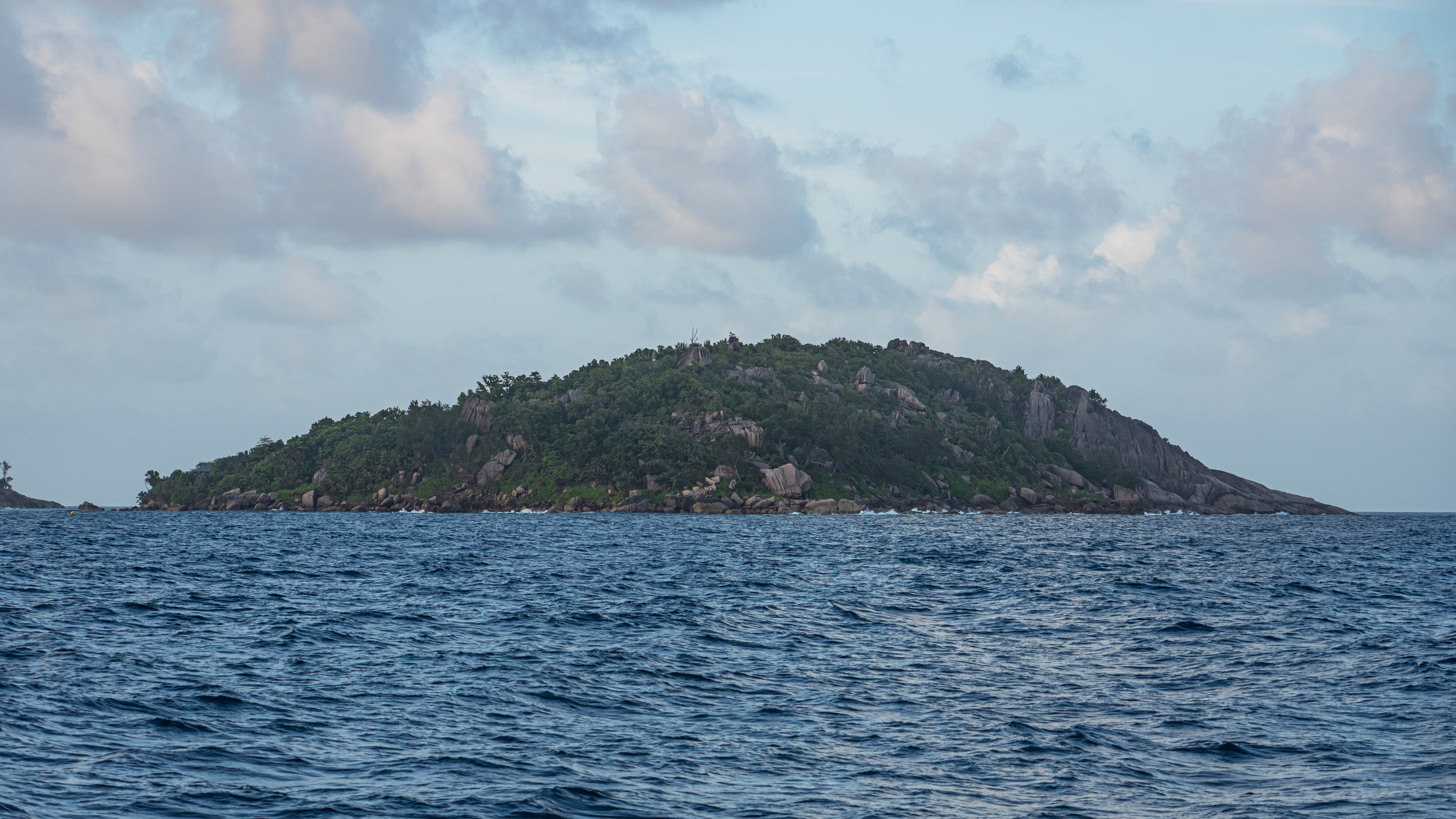

- Location within Seychelles

Geography
- Location: Seychelles, Indian Ocean
- Coordinates: 4°19′48″S 55°39′48″E
- Archipelago: Inner Islands, Seychelles
- Adjacent to: Indian Ocean
- Total islands: 1
- Major islands: Round
- Area: 0.2 km^{2} (0.077 sq mi)
- Length: 0.62 km (0.385 mi)
- Width: 0.35 km (0.217 mi)
- Coastline: 1.9 km (1.18 mi)
- Highest elevation: 75 m (246 ft)

Administration
- Seychelles
- Group: Inner Islands
- Sub-Group: Granitic Seychelles
- Sub-Group: Praslin Islands
- Districts: Baie Sainte Anne
- Largest settlement: Round (pop. 10)

Demographics
- Population: 10 (2014)
- Ethnic groups: Creole, French, East Africans, Indians.

Additional information
- Time zone: SCT (UTC+4)
- ISO code: SC-07
- Official website: www.seychelles.travel/en/discover/the-islands/

Round is an island in Seychelles, lying less than a mile (550 m) southeast of the island of Praslin tilted a little to the southeast of Praslin's easternmost Peninsula and 48 km north-east of the island of Mahe

== Geography ==
Round is a granite island, its length from north to south is 380 m and width from west to east is 620 m. The island is covered with dense tropical vegetation. it has a 75-metre high summit, symmetrical in shape and surrounded by crystal clear water.

Once on the island grew endemic Lodoicea, but it was cut down for the cultivation of Coconut palms and production of Copra. The island is privately owned, and has a small luxury resort, and a private home of the owners family.

There is also a Round Island near the island of Mahé.

== Tourism ==
Today, the island's main industry is tourism, and it is known for its beaches, especially Anse Chez Gabi. One can go on a boat trip or a diving trip around the island.

== Image gallery ==
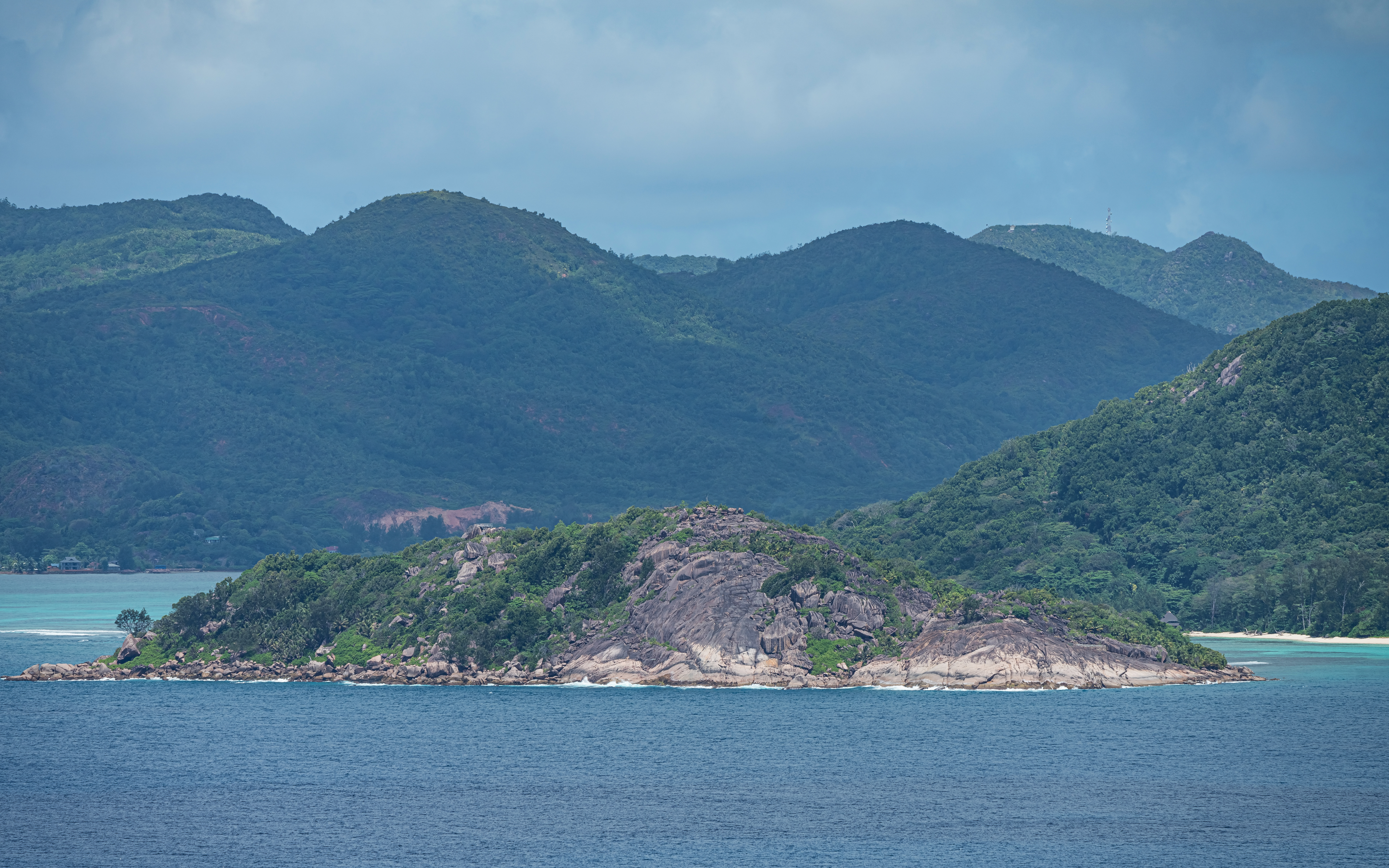
Remote view from La Digue

Map
