= Vache Island, Seychelles =

Island in Seychelles

Vache Island
Nickname: Île aux Vaches Marines
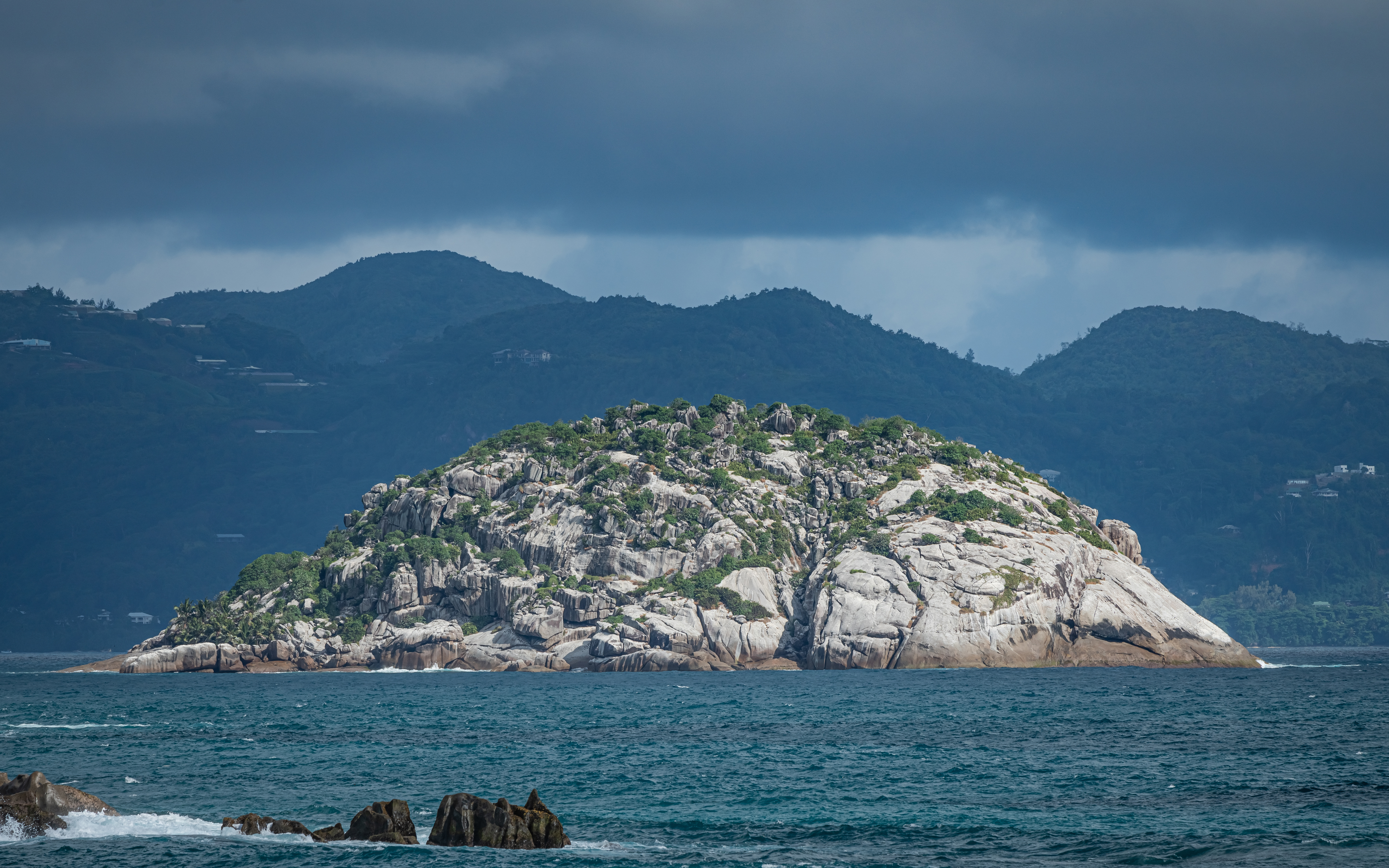

- Location within Seychelles

Geography
- Location: Seychelles, Indian Ocean
- Coordinates: 4°41′S 55°26′E
- Archipelago: Inner Islands, Seychelles
- Adjacent to: Indian Ocean
- Total islands: 1
- Major islands: Île aux Vaches Marines
- Area: 0.047 km^{2} (0.018 sq mi)
- Length: 0.2 km (0.12 mi)
- Width: 0.25 km (0.155 mi)
- Coastline: 0.9 km (0.56 mi)
- Highest elevation: 54 m (177 ft)
- Highest point: Vache

Administration
- Seychelles
- Group: Granitic Seychelles
- Sub-Group: Mahe Islands
- Districts: Grand'Anse Mahé

Demographics
- Population: 0 (2014)
- Pop. density: 0/km^{2} (0/sq mi)

Additional information
- Time zone: SCT (UTC+4)
- ISO code: SC-13
- Official website: www.seychelles.travel/en/discover/the-islands/

Île aux Vaches Marines is one of many islands in the Seychelles, lying in the west shores of Mahe. Île aux Vaches Marines is a granite rock, only slightly covered with vegetation. The island is a popular nesting site for sea-birds. The rocks "Les Trois Dames" are not far from it but are usually hidden by heavily breaking seas.

== Administration ==
The island belongs to Grand'Anse Mahé District.

== Image gallery ==
Map 1

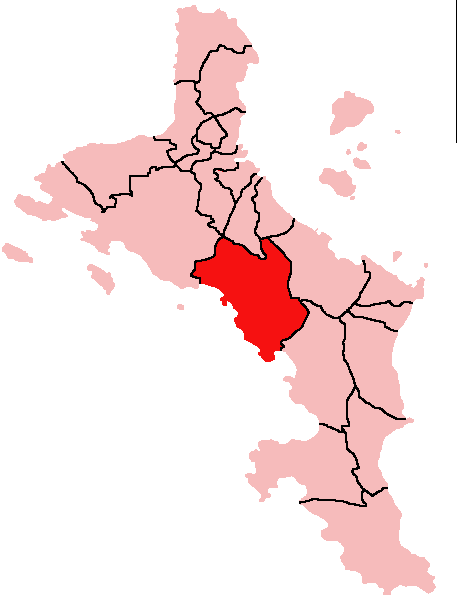
District Map
