= Moyenne Island =

Island in Seychelles

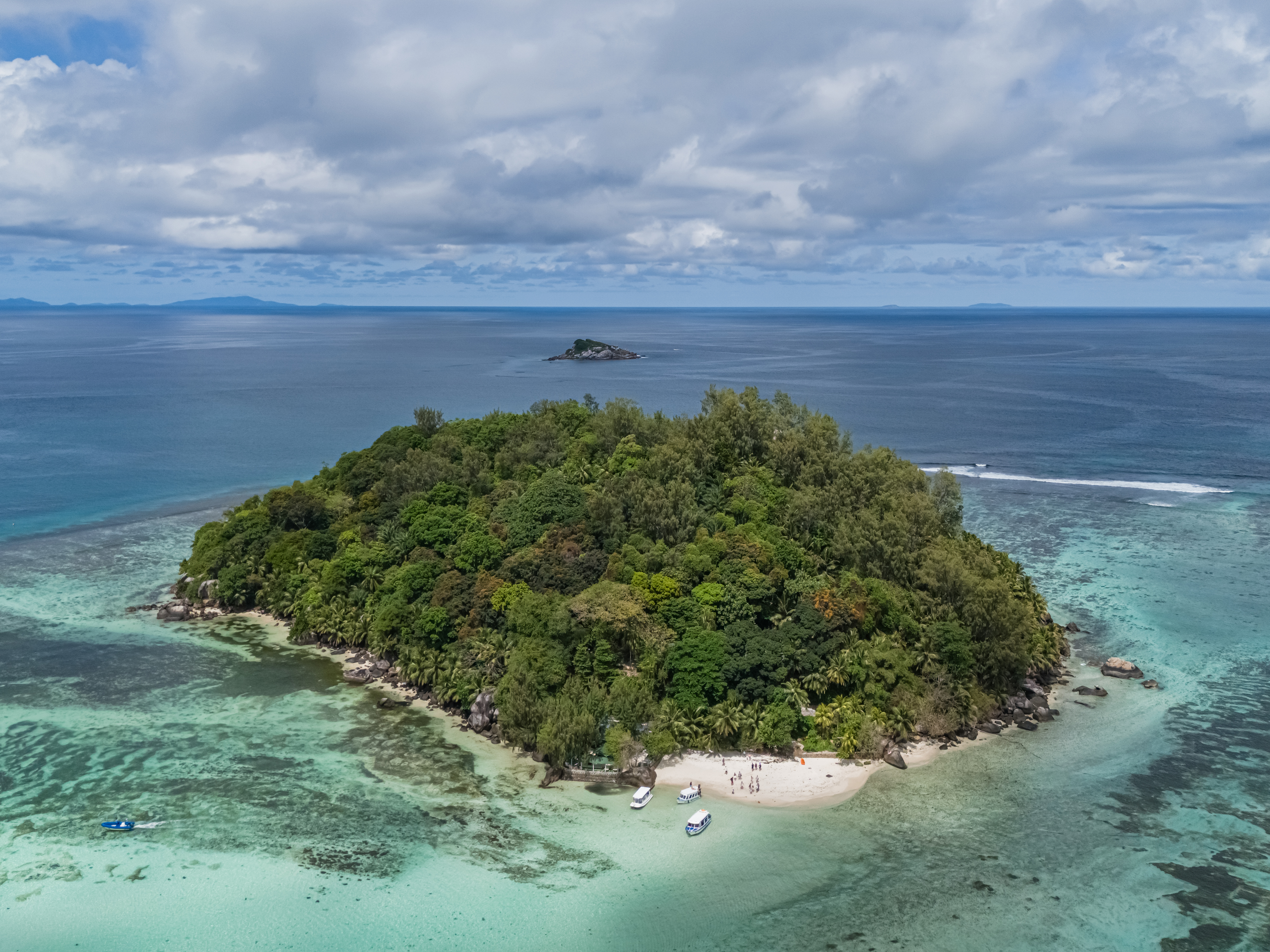

- Location within Seychelles Location within Indian Ocean

Geography
- Location: Seychelles, Indian Ocean
- Coordinates: 4°37′10″S 55°30′31″E
- Archipelago: Inner Islands, Seychelles
- Adjacent to: Indian Ocean
- Total islands: 1
- Major islands: Moyenne Island
- Area: 0.099 km^{2} (0.038 sq mi)
- Length: 0.4 km (0.25 mi)
- Width: 0.3 km (0.19 mi)
- Coastline: 1.7 km (1.06 mi)
- Highest elevation: 61 m (200 ft)
- Highest point: Mont Moyenne

Administration
- Seychelles
- Group: Granitic Seychelles
- Sub-Group: Mahe Islands
- Sub-Group: Ste. Anne Islands
- Districts: Mont Fleuri
- Largest settlement: Anse Creole Travel Services (pop. 1)

Demographics
- Population: 1 (2014)
- Pop. density: 10.1/km^{2} (26.2/sq mi)
- Ethnic groups: Creole, French, East Africans, Indians.

Additional information
- Time zone: SCT (UTC+4)
- ISO code: SC-18
- Official website: www.seychelles.travel/en/discover/the-islands/

Moyenne Island is a 9.9-hectare (24-acre) island in the Sainte Anne Marine National Park off the northeast coast of Mahé, Seychelles in the Indian Ocean. Since the 1970s it has been a flora and fauna reserve. From 1915 until the 1960s, the island was abandoned until its purchase by Brendon Grimshaw, a newspaper editor from Dewsbury in Yorkshire, England, for £8,000.

Grimshaw and Rene Lafortune, a local Seychellois man, were the only inhabitants of the island until Grimshaw's death in July 2012. The island is now a national park and can be visited as part of organized trips.

== History ==
In 1962, Brendon Grimshaw bought the island from Philippe Georges for £8,000 (equivalent to about £149,000 in 2025). Grimshaw and René Antoine Lafortune transformed the island by planting 16,000 trees, building nature paths, and introducing Aldabra giant tortoises. Their goal was to create an island of exceptional beauty, now home to diverse plant and bird life, and nearly 50 giant tortoises.

After 20 years of persistence, Grimshaw and Lafortune succeeded in making Moyenne Island a national park in its own right. The island is now known as Moyenne Island National Park, surrounded by the St. Anne Marine National Park. Following Grimshaw's death in 2012, his friend Suketu Patel oversees the Moyenne Island Foundation, managing the island and fulfilling Grimshaw's vision of preserving the island's natural beauty.

The island remains largely undeveloped, with a small restaurant and museum dedicated to Grimshaw. The fifty Aldabra giant tortoises roam freely.

== Administration ==
The island belongs to Mont Fleuri District.

== Tourism ==
Today, the island's main industry is tourism, and it is known for its beaches. Behind the restaurant is the local warden's house.

== Image gallery ==
Map of the Mahé, Seychelles region

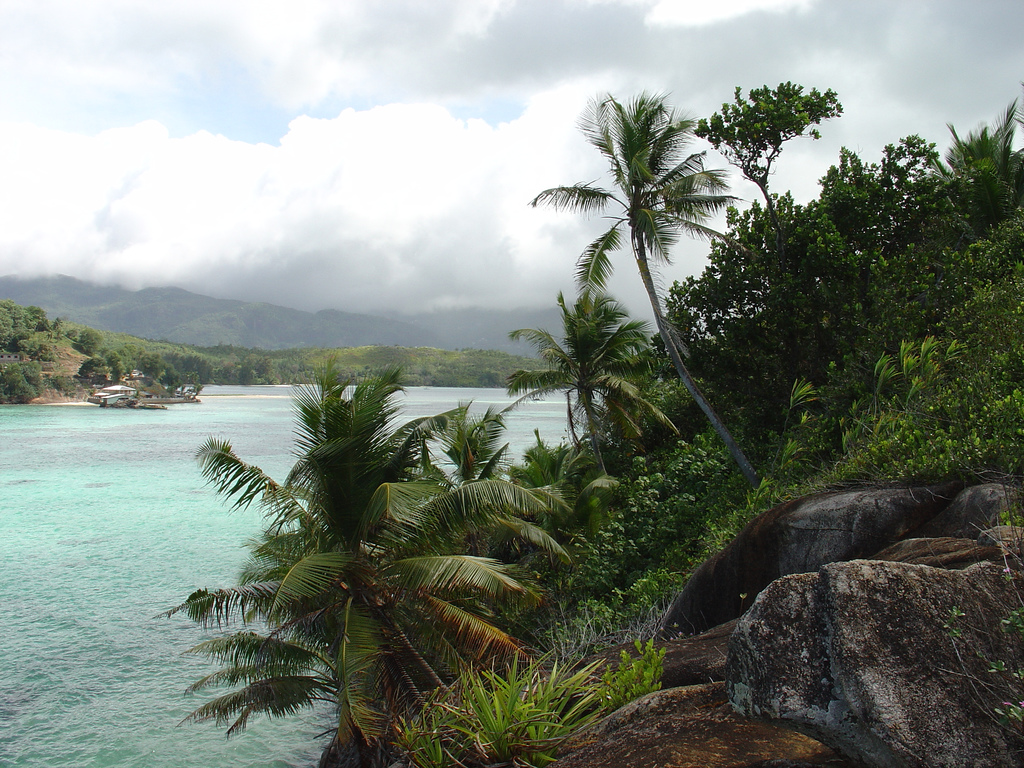
Moyenne Island

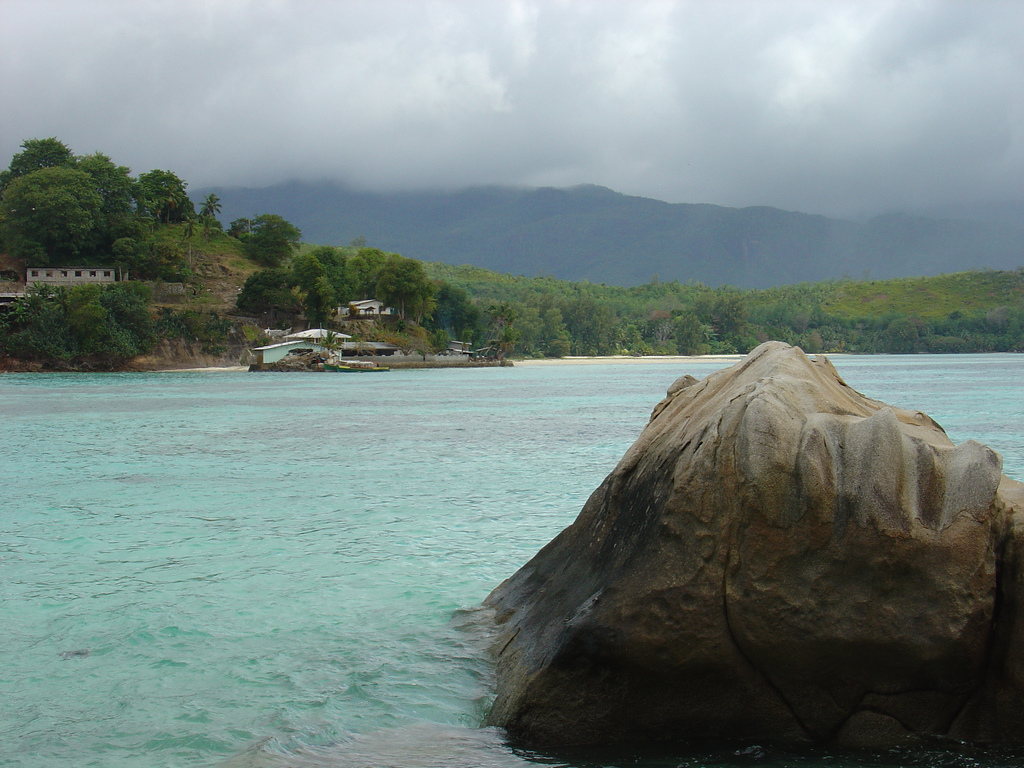
Mahé Island View

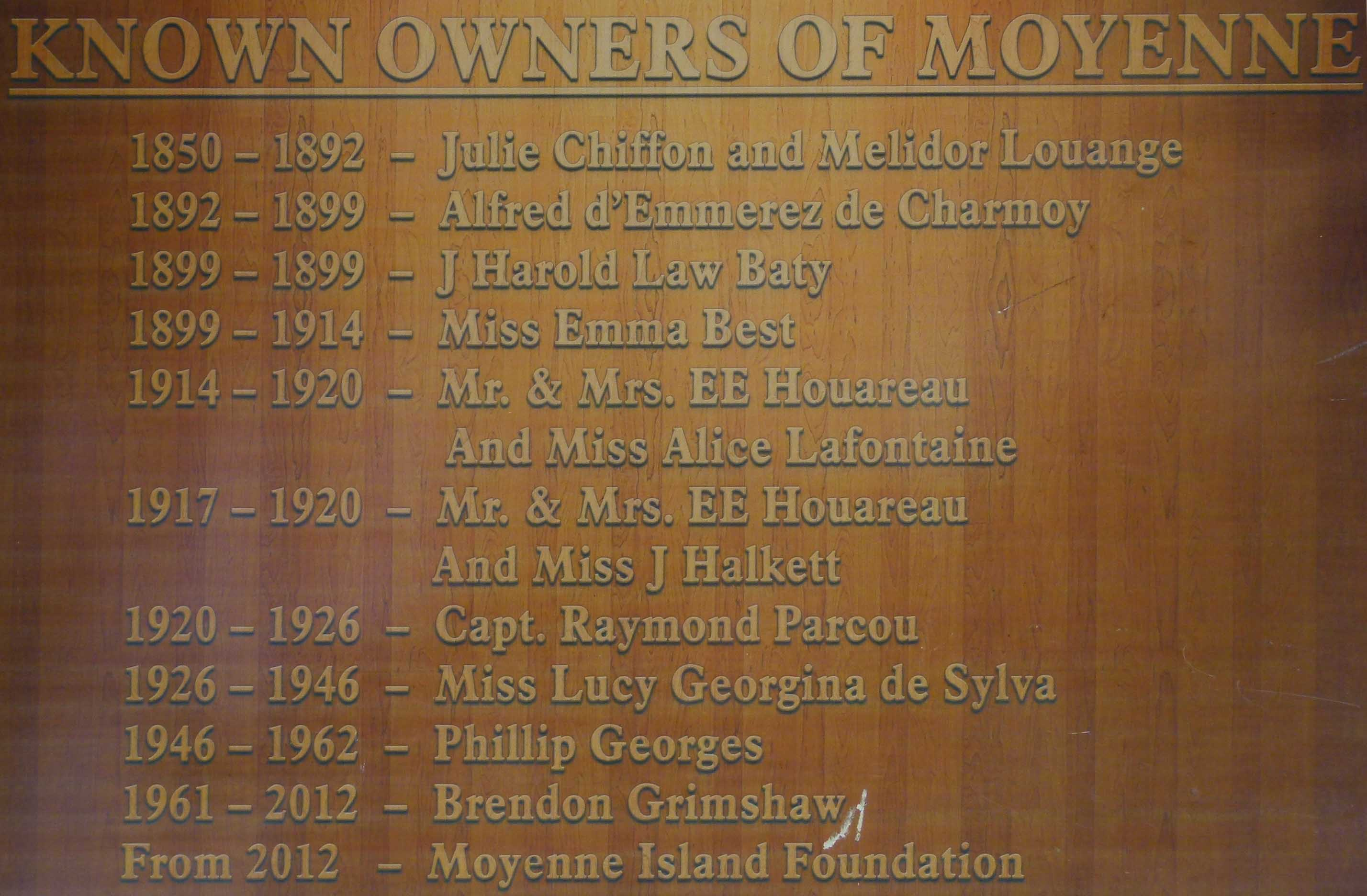
Information board on Moyenne (March 2016)

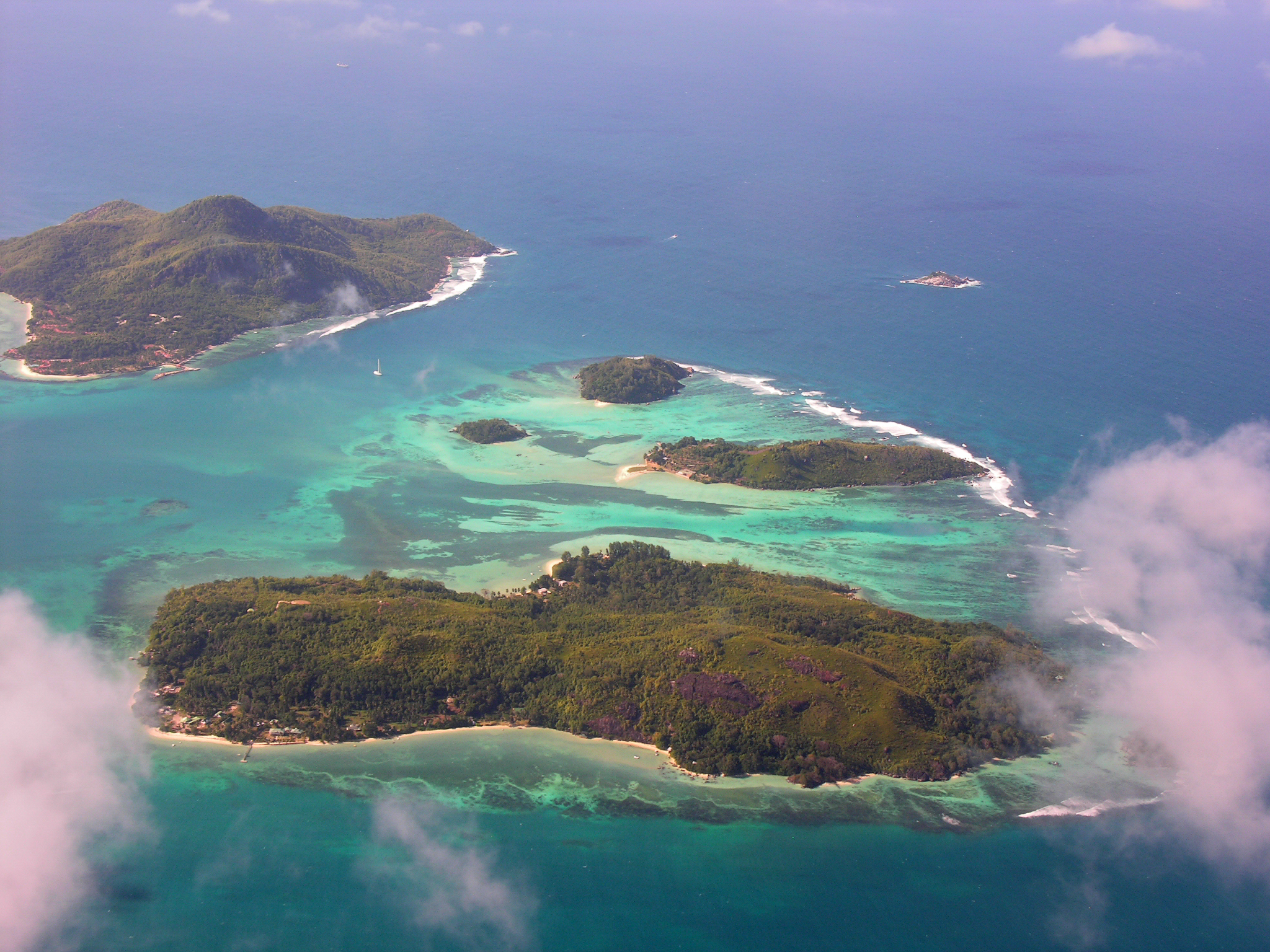
Moyenne Island from southwest

== Bibliography ==
- Grimshaw, Brendon (1996). A Grain of Sand: The Story of One Man and an Island. Camerapix. ISBN 9781874041337.
