= Cocos Islands, Seychelles =

Seychelles islands

Cocos Islands
Nickname: Îles aux Cocos
- Location within Seychelles

Geography
- Location: Seychelles
- Coordinates: 04°18′44″S 55°52′00″E
- Archipelago: Inner Islands, Seychelles
- Adjacent to: Indian Ocean
- Total islands: 4
- Major islands: Cocos Island; Ile La Fouche; Ile Platte
- Area: 0.03 km^{2} (0.012 sq mi)
- Length: 0.25 km (0.155 mi)
- Width: 0.1 km (0.06 mi)
- Coastline: 0.66 km (0.41 mi)

Administration
- Seychelles
- Group: Inner Islands
- Sub-Group: Granitic Seychelles
- Districts: La Digue and Inner Islands

Demographics
- Population: 0 (2014)
- Pop. density: 0/km^{2} (0/sq mi)
- Ethnic groups: Creole, French, East Africans, Indians.

Additional information
- Time zone: SCT (UTC+4)
- ISO code: SC-15
- Official website: www.seychelles.travel/en/discover/the-islands/

Cocos Islands (French: Îles aux Cocos) are a group of small islets in the Seychelles archipelago. They can be found 7 km north of La Digue and lies close to La Digue's other neighbours, Félicité Island and the Sisters Islands. It has been a marine park since 1996 and is a spectacular spot for snorkeling and diving and a popular venue for day excursions from both Praslin and La Digue. No accommodation is offered on this island.

== Gallery ==
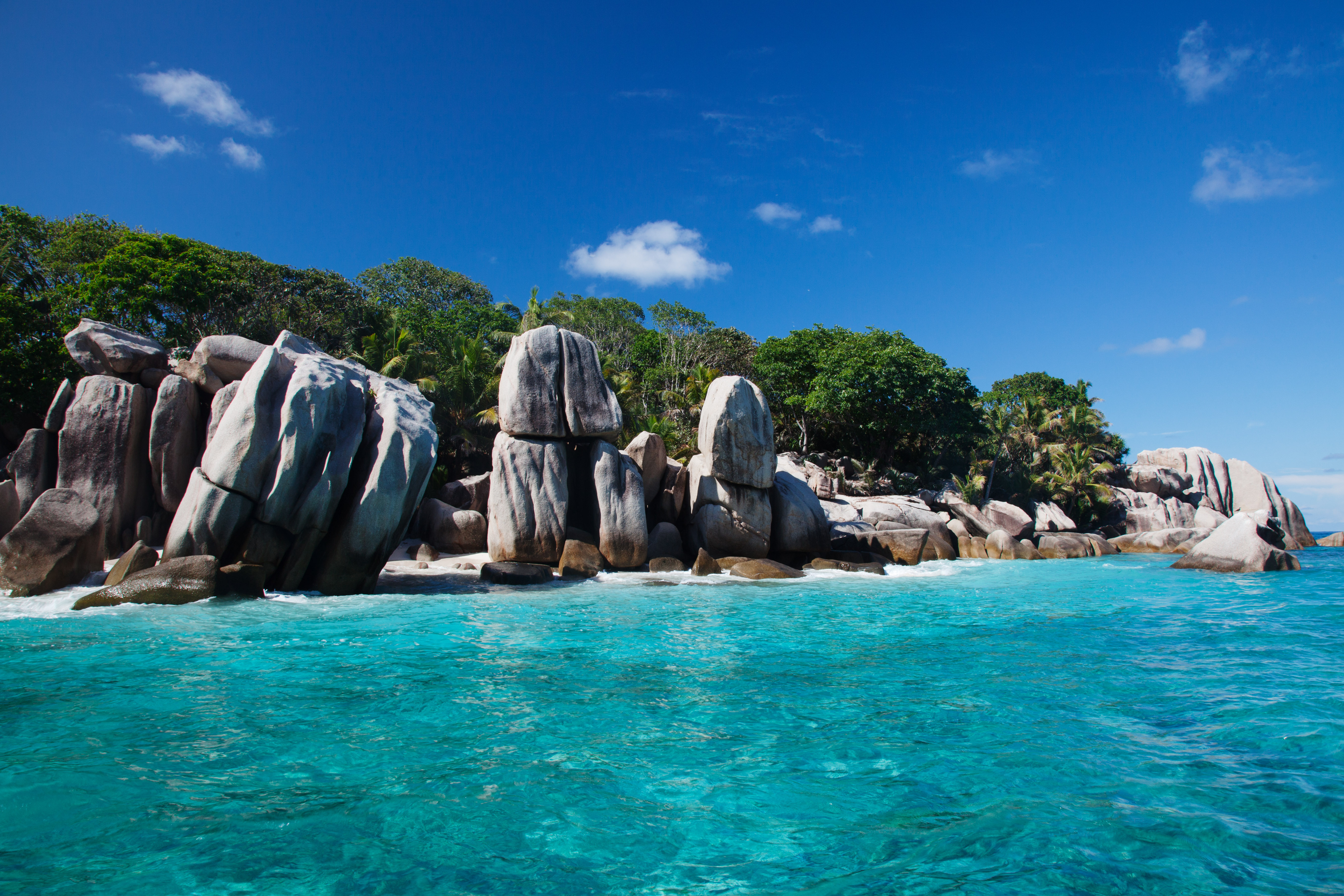
