= Grand'Anse Mahé =

Coordinates: 4°41′30″S 55°28′06″E

- District

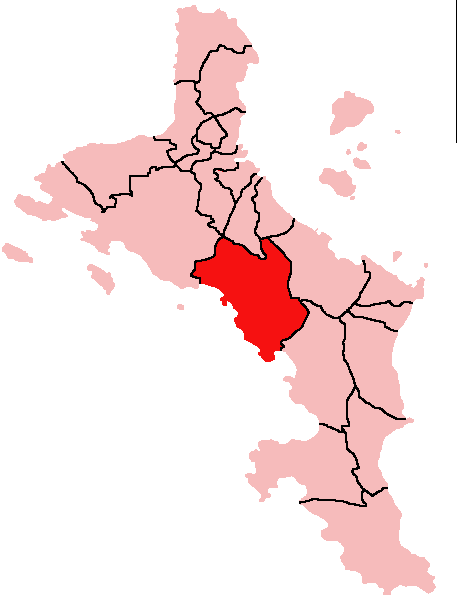
- Location within Mahé Island, Seychelles
- Country: Seychelles

Government
  - District Administrator: Vacant
  - Member of National Assembly: Hon. Waven William (PL)

Population (2019 Estimate)
  - Total: 3,568
- Time zone: Seychelles Time

Grand'Anse Mahé (French pronunciation: [ɡʁɑ̃dɑ̃smae]) is an administrative district of Seychelles located on the island of Mahé.
