= Waven William =

Personal details
- Occupation: Politician

Waven William is a member of the National Assembly of Seychelles. He is a member of the Seychelles People's Progressive Front, and was first elected to the Assembly in 1993.

== See also ==
- Politics of Seychelles
