= Corneille Nicholas Morphey =

Captain Corneille Nicholas Morphey was the commander of the French East India Company frigate Le Cerf.

On November 1, 1756, he took possession of the Seychelles in the name of the King of France and the French East India Company.
