= Geography of Seychelles =

- Continent: Africa
- Region: Indian Ocean
- Coordinates: 4°35′S 55°40′E
- Area: Ranked 180th
  - Total: 452 km^{2} (175 sq mi)
  - Land: 100%
  - Water: 0%
- Coastline: 491 km (305 mi)
- Borders: None
- Highest point: Morne Seychellois; 905 metres (2,969 ft)
- Lowest point: Indian Ocean; 0 m
- Exclusive economic zone: 1,336,559 km^{2} (516,048 mi^{2})

Seychelles is a small island country east of the African continent located in the Sea of Zanj due north of Madagascar, with Antsiranana as its nearest foreign city. Seychelles lies between approximately 4ºS and 10ºS and 46ºE and 54ºE. The nation is an archipelago of 155 tropical islands, some granite and some coral, the majority of which are small and uninhabited. The landmass is only 452 km^{2} (175 mi^{2}) but the islands are spread wide over an exclusive economic zone of 1,336,559 km^{2} (516,048 mi^{2}). About 90 percent of the population of 100,000 live on Mahé, 9 percent on Praslin and La Digue. Around a third of the land area is the island of Mahé and a further third the atoll of Aldabra.

There are two distinct regions, the granitic islands, the world's only oceanic islands of granitic rock and the coralline outer islands. The granite islands are the world's oldest ocean islands, while the outer islands are mainly very young, though Aldabra Atoll and St. Pierre Island (Farquhar Group) are unusual, raised coral islands that have emerged and submerged several times during their long history, the most recent submergence dating from about 125,000 years ago

== Physical features ==
The archipelago consists of 155 islands and thirty prominent rock formations scattered throughout a self-proclaimed exclusive economic zone of more than 1,350,000 square kilometres (520,000 sq mi) of ocean. Some forty islands are granitic and lie in a 90 km (56 mi) radius from Mahé, the main island. The remaining islands are coralline, stretching over a 1,200 km (750 mi) radius from Ile Aux Vaches in the northeast to the Aldabra Atoll in the southwest. The country's Inner Islands are the granitic islands plus two nearby coralline islands, Bird Island and Denis Island. The remaining coralline islands are the Outer Islands. The islands are all small—the aggregate land area is only 455 km^{2} (176 sq mi).

Mahé is 25 km (16 mi) long and no more than 8 km (5.0 mi) wide, with an area of 156.7 km^{2} (61 sq mi). It contains the capital and only city, Victoria, an excellent port. Victoria lies approximately 1,600 km (990 mi) east of Mombasa, Kenya; 2,800 km (1,700 mi) southwest of Mumbai; 1,700 km (1,100 mi) north of Mauritius; and 920 km (570 mi) northeast of Madagascar. The only other important islands by virtue of their size and population are Praslin and La Digue, situated about 30 km to the northeast of Mahé.

The granitic islands are founded on a fragment separated from the Indian continental plate during the Palaeocene about 66 million years ago during the break up of the supercontinent of Gondwana. This break-up was associated with the volcanic activity that built the Mascarene Plateau. These granitic islands are characterized by boulder-covered hills and mountains as high as 940 metres (3,080 ft) rising abruptly from the sea. Elsewhere, narrow coastal plains extend to the base of the foothills. Extensively developed coral reefs are found mainly on the east coasts because of the southwest trade winds and equatorial current. Ninety-nine percent of the population is located on the granitic islands, and most are on Mahé.

The coralline islands differ sharply from the granitic in that they are very flat, often rising only a few feet (one meter) above sea level. They have no fresh water, and very few have a resident population. Many, like Ile aux Vaches, Ile Denis, the Amirante Isles, Platte Island, and Coëtivy Island, are sand cays upon which extensive coconut plantations have been established. Some of the coralline islands consist of uplifted reefs and atolls covered with stunted vegetation. Several of these islands have been important breeding grounds for turtles and birds, as well as the sites of extensive guano deposits, which formerly constituted an important element of the Seychellois economy but now for the most part are depleted. The Aldabra Islands, the largest coralline atoll with an area greater than Mahé, are a sanctuary for rare animals and birds.

The five groups of coralline islands that make up the Outer Islands are the Southern Coral Group (a collective term for Île Platte and Coëtivy Island), Amirante Islands, Alphonse Group (Alphonse Atoll and St. François Atoll), Aldabra Group (Aldabra Atoll, Assumption Island, and the Cosmoledo Group, consisting of Cosmoledo Atoll and Astove Atoll), and Farquhar Group (Farquhar Atoll, Providence Atoll and St. Pierre Island).

== Geology ==
The Seychelles Bank is founded on a granite basement, a fragment separated from the Indian continental plate during the Palaeocene about 66 million years ago. This break-up was associated with the volcanic activity that built the Mascarene Plateau. The occurrence of syenite, diorite and microgranite in the western part of the Seychelles Bank could indicate that crustal deposit across the northwestern Indian Ocean Ridge apparently drove the Seychelles block southwestwards, causing it to collide with the northeastern edge of the Mascarene Basin. This collision could have led to the development of the Amirante Trough. This rift formation is associated with the Réunion hotspot which is also responsible for Réunion Island and the Deccan Traps in India. Because of its long isolation, the Seychelles hosts several unique species including the coco de mer, a palm which has the largest seeds of any plant and the world's largest population of giant tortoises.

== Climate ==
The climate of Seychelles is tropical, having little seasonal variation. Temperatures on Mahé rarely rise above 29 °C (84 °F) or drop below 24 °C (75 °F). Humidity is high, but its enervating effect is usually ameliorated by prevailing winds. The southeast monsoon from late May to September brings cooler weather, and the northwest monsoon from March to May, warmer weather.

High winds are rare inasmuch as most islands lie outside the Indian Ocean cyclone belt; Mahé suffered the only such storm in its recorded history in 1862. Mean annual rainfall in Mahé averages 2,880 millimetres (113 in) at sea level and as much as 3,550 millimetres (140 in) on the mountain slopes. Precipitation is somewhat less on the other islands, averaging as low as 500 millimetres (20 in) per year on the southernmost coral islands.

Because catchment provides most sources of water in Seychelles, yearly variations in rainfall or even brief periods of drought can produce water shortages. Small dams have been built on Mahé since 1969 in an effort to guarantee a reliable water supply, but drought can still be a problem on Mahé and particularly on La Digue.

Climate data for Victoria (Seychelles International Airport) 1972–2011
Month	Jan	Feb	Mar	Apr	May	Jun	Jul	Aug	Sep	Oct	Nov	Dec	Year
Record high °C (°F)	33.3 (91.9)	33.4 (92.1)	33.5 (92.3)	34.1 (93.4)	33.5 (92.3)	32.6 (90.7)	31.1 (88.0)	31.4 (88.5)	31.6 (88.9)	32.4 (90.3)	34.4 (93.9)	33.4 (92.1)	34.4 (93.9)
Mean daily maximum °C (°F)	29.9 (85.8)	30.5 (86.9)	31.1 (88.0)	31.5 (88.7)	30.7 (87.3)	29.2 (84.6)	28.4 (83.1)	28.6 (83.5)	29.2 (84.6)	29.9 (85.8)	30.2 (86.4)	30.2 (86.4)	30.0 (86.0)
Daily mean °C (°F)	26.9 (80.4)	27.5 (81.5)	27.9 (82.2)	28.1 (82.6)	27.9 (82.2)	26.8 (80.2)	26.0 (78.8)	26.1 (79.0)	26.5 (79.7)	26.9 (80.4)	27.0 (80.6)	27.0 (80.6)	27.1 (80.8)
Mean daily minimum °C (°F)	24.3 (75.7)	24.9 (76.8)	25.1 (77.2)	25.3 (77.5)	25.6 (78.1)	24.8 (76.6)	24.1 (75.4)	24.1 (75.4)	24.4 (75.9)	24.6 (76.3)	24.3 (75.7)	24.2 (75.6)	24.6 (76.3)
Record low °C (°F)	24.1 (75.4)	21.1 (70.0)	22.1 (71.8)	22.3 (72.1)	21.6 (70.9)	20.9 (69.6)	20.4 (68.7)	19.6 (67.3)	20.2 (68.4)	20.5 (68.9)	21.5 (70.7)	20.0 (68.0)	19.6 (67.3)
Average rainfall mm (inches)	401.3 (15.80)	270.2 (10.64)	195.5 (7.70)	188.1 (7.41)	146.0 (5.75)	102.9 (4.05)	80.3 (3.16)	114.2 (4.50)	150.0 (5.91)	192.8 (7.59)	205.0 (8.07)	303.2 (11.94)	2,349.5 (92.50)
Average relative humidity (%)	83	80	80	80	79	79	80	79	79	79	80	82	80
Mean monthly sunshine hours	155.0	175.2	213.9	231.0	254.2	225.0	232.5	232.5	219.0	226.3	204.0	176.7	2,545.3
Mean daily sunshine hours	5.0	6.2	6.9	7.7	8.2	7.5	7.5	7.5	7.3	7.3	6.8	5.7	6.97
Source: Seychelles National Meteorological Services

== Flora and fauna ==
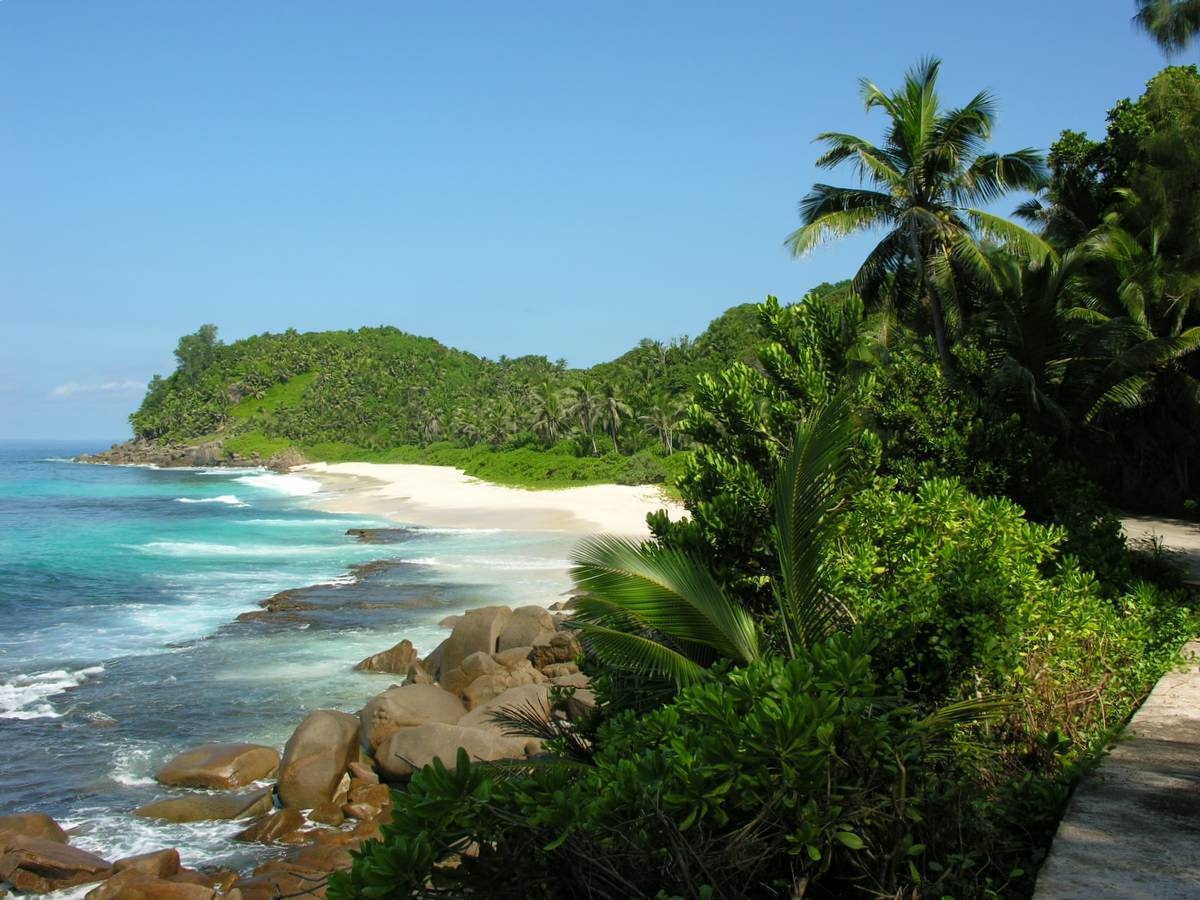
The Island Mahé

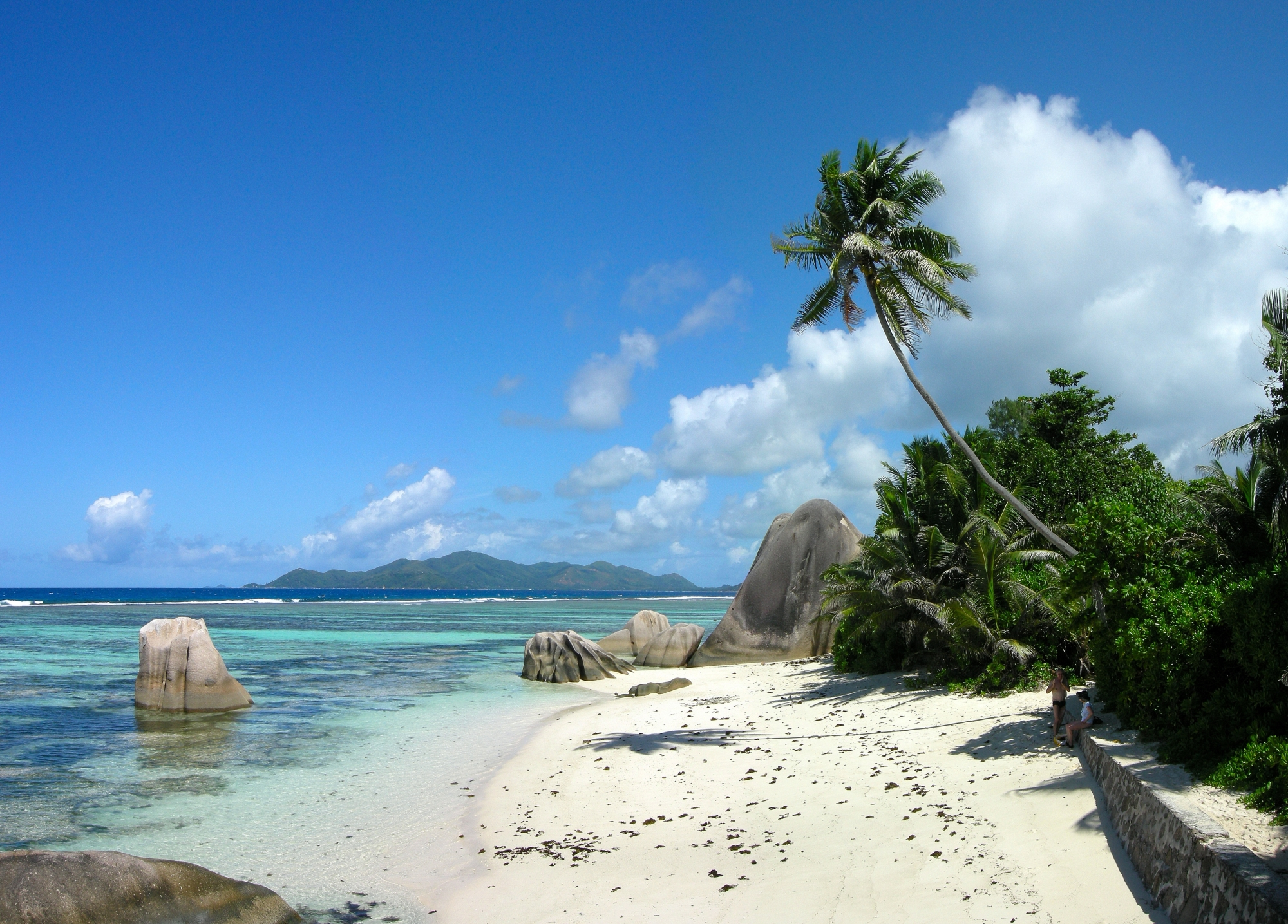
White beach on the island La Digue

The Seychelles contain at least 75 species of flowering plants, three mammal species, 14 bird species, 30 species of reptiles and amphibians, and several hundred species of snails, insects, spiders and other invertebrates found nowhere else. In addition, the waters contain more than 900 kinds of fish, of which more than one-third are associated with coral reefs. Specific examples of unique birds are the Seychelles paradise flycatcher, the Seychelles black parrot, the Seychelles warbler, and the flightless rail. Most famous of all the Seychelles animals are the giant tortoises of the genus Aldabrachelys.

=== Environmental threats ===
Vast amounts of plastic debris accumulate on beaches across Seychelles. Observational analysis suggests that most terrestrial debris originates from Indonesia, India, and Sri Lanka. Debris associated with fisheries including fish aggregating devices also poses a major problem. Rats have reduced biodiversity on many islands. Climate change is also a significant issue.

Seychelles began addressing the conservation problem in the late 1960s by creating the Nature Conservancy Commission, later renamed the Seychelles National Environment Commission. A system of national parks and animal preserves covering 42% of the land area and about 260 square kilometres (100 sq mi) of the surrounding water areas has been set aside. Legislation protects wildlife and bans various destructive practices.

A major project was funded by the Fonds Francais pour l'Environnement Mondial (FFEM) and implemented by the Island Conservation Society. The project aims to rehabilitate and enhance islands for the maintenance of native biodiversity in Seychelles through eradication of introduced predator species, rehabilitation of habitats and reintroduction of rare or threatened species. Rats have been eliminated from North Island, Cosmoledo Atoll and Conception Island.

== Facts and figures ==
Detailed map of Seychelles

Geographic coordinates: 4°35′S 55°40′E

Area:

Total: 459 km^{2} Land: 459 km^{2} Water: 0 km^{2}

Land boundaries: 0 km

Coastline: 491 km

Maritime claims:

Continental shelf: 200 nmi (370.4 km; 230.2 mi) or to the edge of the continental margin

Exclusive economic zone: 1,336,559 km^{2} (516,048 mi^{2}) with 200 nmi (370.4 km; 230.2 mi)

Territorial sea: 12 nmi (22.2 km; 13.8 mi)

Elevation extremes:

Lowest point: Indian Ocean 0 m

Highest point: Morne Seychellois 905 m

Natural resources: fish, copra, cinnamon trees

Land use:

Arable land: 2%

Permanent crops: 13%

Permanent pastures: 0%

Forests and woodland: 11%
Other: 74% (1993 est.)

Irrigated land: 0 km^{2}

Environment – international agreements:

Party to: Biodiversity, Climate Change, Desertification, Endangered Species, Hazardous Wastes, Law of the Sea, Marine Dumping, Nuclear Test Ban, Ozone Layer Protection, Ship Pollution

Signed, but not ratified: Climate change – Kyoto Protocol

Formerly party to: Whaling (withdrew June 30, 1995).

== List of islands ==
Island	Capital	Other cities	Area (km^{2})	Population
Inner Islands	Victoria	La Passe, Grand Anse	247.20	89521
Mahé Islands	Victoria		163.20	78333
Anonyme	Anonyme	Anse Pimen Vert,	0.10	5
Cerf	L'habitation	Kapok Tree Beach, West Beach, Turtle Beach, South Point,	1.27	100
Conception	Anse Conception		0.6	0
Eden	Eden Project		0.56	100
Aux Vaches			0.04	0
Long	Anse Shangri-La	Anse Prison	0.23	100
Mahé	Victoria	Cascade, Anse Royale, Anse Boileau, Beau Vallon	156.70	77983
Mamelles	Mamelles		0.1	0
Moyenne	Brendon Grimshaw Estate	Anse Jolly Roger	0.09	1
Round	Île Ronde		0.02	1
Sainte Anne	Grand Anse	Anse le mont fleuri, Anse Royal, Anse Tortue, Anse Manon,	2.19	40
Therese	Anse Therese		0.74	3
Other Islands	Romainville	Ile Soleil	0.56	0
Praslin Islands	Grand Anse	Anse Volbert, St. Anne	42.20	7682
Aride	Aride Village	Robinson Crusoe beach, Turtle beach,	0.68	8
Chauve Souris	Anse Chauve Souris		0.01	2
Cousin	Anse Cousin		0.29	6
Cousine	East beach	west beach, North Beach	0.26	16
Curieuse	Baie Laraie	Anse St. Joseph, Anse Papao, Grand Anse, Pointe Rouge (red), Anse Badamer, Pointe Caimant, Tortoise Point	2.86	7
Eve	Eve Island Project		0.27	100
Praslin	Grand Anse	Anse Volbert, Baie Saint Anne	37.56	7533
Round	Anse Round	Anse Chez Gaby	0.19	10
Other Islands	Booby Island		0.07	0
La Digue and Inner Islands	La Passe		41.80	3506
Bird	Bird Island Village	birdwatchers beach	0.75	38
Denis	St. Denis	north end, anse boise d'argent, ance prince noir,	1.43	80
Felicite	La Penice	Ans Zil Pasyon, Grand Ans,	2.68	20
Fregate	Fregate Marina	Anse Lesange, Anse Bambous,	2.20	214
Iles Soeurs	Grande Soeur Hotel	Petite Soeur	1.18	2
La Digue	La Passe	anse patates, cap bayard, grande anse, roche bois, L' Union, La Reunion	10.30	2800
Marianne	Ans La Cour	Pointe aux Joncs, Pointe Grand Glacis	0.97	0
North	North Island Lodge	East Beach, West Beach (or Grande Anse), Honeymoon Cove, Dive Beach	2.00	152
Silhouette	La Passe	Grand Barbe,	20.00	200
Other Islands	Cocos	Recife	0.29	0
Outer Islands	(Coëtivy)	Desroches, D'Arros, Alphonse	211.8	503
Aldabra Group	Assumption west beach	Picard Island station, Aldabra anse mais, Aldabra anse var,	178.24	12
Aldabra	Picard Island station	anse mais, anse var,	155.4	0
Assumption	Assumption west beach		11.6	12
Cosmoledo			5.13	0
Astove			7.9	0
Other Islands			0.	0
Alphonse Group	Anse d'Est	Anse Sud	2.2	84
Alphonse	Anse d'Est	Anse Sud	1.7	84
St. François			0.5	0
Other Islands			0.	0
Amirante Group	Desroches	D'Arros, Poivre Nord, Remire (Eagle), Marie Louise	9.9	123
D'Arros	The Estate	north beach	1.5	42
Desroches	south point village	northeast point, Bombe Bay,	3.24	50
Poivre	Poivre Nord	Poivre Sud	2.48	10
Remire (Eagle)			0.	6
Marie Louise	North west point village		0.53	15
Other Islands			2.15	0
Farquhar Group	Farquhar Anse Franc	Providence	13.2	21
Farquhar	Anse Franc	Vingt Cinq	8.00	15
Providence			3.5	6
St. Pierre Island			1.6	0
Other Islands			0.1	0
Southern Coral Group	Coëtivy	Ile Platte	9.96	263
Coëtivy	Coëtivy		9.31	260
Platte	Île Platte		0.65	3
Other Islands			0.0	0
Seychelles	Victoria		459.0	90024

== Extreme points ==
This is a list of the extreme points of Seychelles, the points that are farther north, south, east or west than any other location.

- Northernmost point – Bird Island, Outer Islands district
- Easternmost point – Coëtivy Island, Outer Islands district
- Southernmost point – Goelette Island, Farquhar Group, Outer Islands district
- Westernmost point – West Island, Aldabra Islands, Outer Islands district

== See also ==
- Seychelles microcontinent
- Mascarene Plateau
