= Baie Saint Anne =

- District

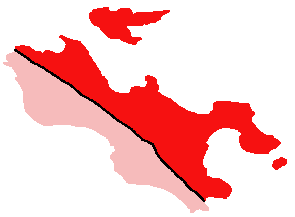
- Location within and near Praslin Island, Seychelles

- Location within Seychelles Location within Indian Ocean
- Coordinates: 4.31667°S 55.7333°E
- Country: Seychelles

Government
  - District Administrator: Denis Antat
  - Member of National Assembly: Hon. Churchill Gill PL)

Population (2019 Estimate)
  - Total: 4,786
- Time zone: Seychelles Time

Baie Sainte Anne (French pronunciation: [bɛ sɛ̃t an]) is an administrative district of Seychelles located mostly on the island of Praslin, but also administers Curieuse Island and some other smaller islands.
