= Mont Fleuri =

Coordinates: 4°38′S 55°27′E

- District

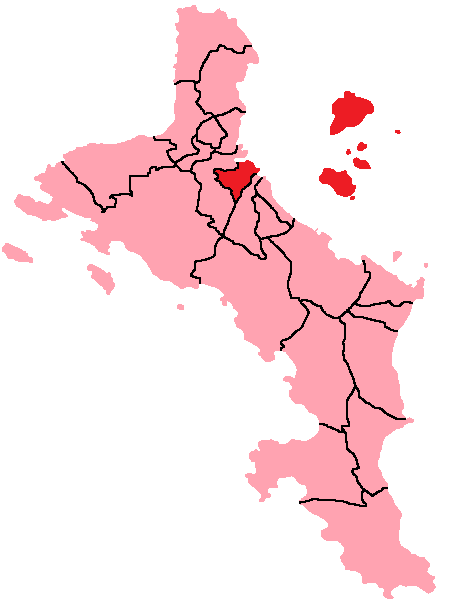
- Location within Mahé Island, Seychelles
- Country: Seychelles

Government
  - District Administrator: Jancy Volcere
  - Member of National Assembly: Hon. Michel Roucou (LDS)

Population (2019 Estimate)
  - Total: 3,418
- Time zone: Seychelles Time

Mont Fleuri (French pronunciation: [mɔ̃ flœʁi]) is an administrative district of Seychelles with its main part located on the island of Mahé. It also includes the six islands of the Sainte Anne Marine National Park and two islets further east (Beacon Island (Île Seche) and Harrison Rock).

== Tourist attractions ==
- Sheikh Mohamed bin Khalifa Mosque
