= Seychellois Creole people =

Ethnic group

Seychellois Creoles
- Flag of the Seychelles

Regions with significant populations
- Seychelles: c. 76,000
- Australia: 3,997 (2021)

Languages
- Seychellois Creole, French, English

Religion
- Christianity, Hinduism, Islam, irreligion

Seychellois Creole people /seɪˈʃɛlwɑː ˈkriːoʊl/ are an ethnic group native to Seychelles, who speak Seychellois Creole. They are the predominant ethnic group in the country.

The majority of the people living in the Seychelles are referred to as Seychellois. They are of Creole, East African and Malagasy origin. However, some Seychellois also have French, British, Chinese and/or Indian origins (among others).

== Origins ==
Originally slaves from Africa and other parts of the world who were transported to the Seychelles islands to work on various fields and plantations. They were known for being the last slaves to be introduced to the Indian Ocean. The Seychellois people are a mix of the descendants of slaves that were brought to the islands by the French and British.

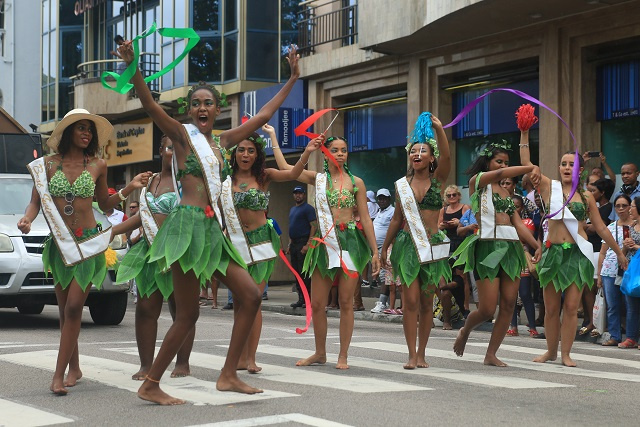
Women celebrate their heritage at the Seychelles Creole Festival in Victoria

== Distribution ==
Today, Seychellois are dispersed throughout Seychelles. They number roughly 76,000, which is more than 70% of the entire Seychellois population. The Seychellois are the dominant group in politics.

The Seychellois music genre of Sega is known as Moutia.

The Seychellois people are proud of their African heritage and set up a Creole institute in Mahé to help promote their culture and to help others understand it. Unlike Mauritius, where Creole has no official status, the Seychelles have made Creole (specifically Seychellois Creole) one of their three official languages, along with French and English.

== Demographics ==
Like most of the country's population, the majority of Seychellois identify as Christians. Most of them are Catholic, with Protestant, Anglican, Adventist and other Christian denominations in the minority. The remainder of the population are either Hindu, Buddhist or Muslim.
