= List of islands of Africa =

Location of Africa

This is a list of islands of Africa.

== Sovereign island nations ==
=== Indian Ocean ===
==== Union of the Comoros ====
- Grande Comore
- Anjouan
- Mohéli

==== Republic of Madagascar ====
- Île Sainte-Marie (also known as Nosy Boraha)
- Nosy Be

==== Republic of Mauritius ====
- Mauritius island
- Rodrigues island
- Agaléga Islands
- Saint Brandon

==== Republic of Seychelles ====
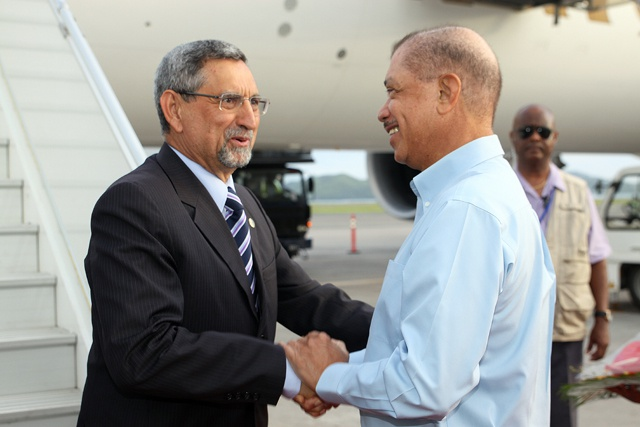
Cape Verdean President Jorge Carlos Fonseca (left) and the President of Seychelles James Michel, 2014

- Inner Islands:
  - La Digue
  - Félicité
  - Marianne
  - Grande Soeur
  - Petite Soeur
  - Ile aux Cocos
  - Ile la Fouche
  - Silhouette Island
  - Ile du Nord
  - Les Mamelles
  - Ile aux Récifs
  - Frégate
  - L'Ilot
  - Ile aux Vaches
  - Vache Marine
  - Chauve Souris
  - Roche Canon
  - Les Trois Dames
  - Cocos Dans Trou
  - Bird Island
  - Ile Denis (Denis Island)
  - Mahé
  - Praslin
  - Sainte Anne
  - Ile Ronde
  - Moyenne Island
  - Therese
  - Roche Tortue
  - Ile Du Suete
  - Conception
  - Ile Hodoul
  - Coco Dans Milieu
  - Ile Longue
  - Ile Malice
  - L'Islette
  - Roche Bouquet
  - Baleise Island
  - Beacon Island
  - Roche Grande Maman
  - Cousin
  - Cousine
  - Zave
  - Aride
  - Ile Seche
  - Ile Cachee
  - Cerf Island
  - Ile Aux Rats
  - Souris
  - Capucins
  - Ile De La Police
  - Ilot Lascar
  - Grosse Roche
  - Reclaimed Island
  - Grande Rocher
  - Anonyme Island
  - Curieuse
  - St. Pierre Island, Farquhar
  - St. Pierre Island, Praslin
  - Faon
  - Bastille Island
  - Bonhomme Island
  - Bonnefemme Island
  - Lazare Islet
  - Grosse Roche
  - L'Amour Island
  - Ile Consolation
  - Matelot Island
  - Maquereau Island
  - Roche Du Sud
  - Takamaka Island
  - Ile Madge
  - Pointe Cocos
  - Ile Zanguille
  - Kittery Island
  - Parasole Island
  - Ile De La Farine
  - Ilot Capitaine
  - Severe Island
  - Cabris Island
  - Roche Babri
  - Cipaille Island
  - Caimant Island
  - Bonne Carre Island
  - Brizare Rock
  - Brule
- Outer Islands:
  - Ile Plate
  - Coëtivy
- Amirantes Group:
  - Rémire
  - D'Arros
  - Desroches
  - Sand
  - Etoile
  - Boudeuse
  - Marie-Louise
  - Desnoeufs
- African Banks:
  - Bancs Africains
  - Ile du Sud
- St. Joseph's Atoll:
  - St. Joseph
  - Ile aux Fouquets
  - Resource
  - Petit Carcassaye
  - Grand Carcassaye
  - Benjamin
  - Bancs Ferrari
  - Chiens
  - Pélicans
  - Vars
  - Residence Island
  - Ile Paul
  - Banc de Sable
  - Bancs aux Cocos
  - Ile aux Poules
- Poivre Atoll:
  - Poivre
  - Florentin
  - Ile du Sud
- Alphonse and St. François Atolls:
  - Alphonse Island
  - Bijoutier
  - St François
- Farquhar Group
- Farquhar Atoll:
  - Ile du Nord
  - Ile du Sud
  - Manahas Nord
  - Manahas Milieu
  - Manahas Sud
  - Ile aux Goëlettes
  - Lapins
  - Ile du Milieu
  - Déposés
  - Bancs de Sable
- Providence Atoll:
  - Providence
  - Bancs Providence
  - St. Pierre
  - Cerf Island
- Aldabra Group
- Aldabra Atoll:
  - Grande Terre
  - Picard
  - Polymnie
  - Malabar
  - Ile Michel
  - Ile Esprit
  - Ile aux Moustiques
  - Ilot Parc
  - Ilot Emile
  - Ilot Yangue
  - Ilot Magnan
  - Ile Lanier
  - Champignon des Os
  - Euphrates Islet
  - Grand Mentor
  - Grand Ilot
  - Green Rock
  - Gros Ilot Gionnet
  - Gros Ilot Sésame
  - Heron Rock
  - Hide Island
  - Ile aux Aigrettes
  - Ile aux Cèdres
  - Iles Chalands
  - Ile Fangame
  - Ile Héron
  - le Michel
  - Ile Suacco
  - Ile Sylvestre
  - Ile Verte
  - Ilot Déder
  - Ilot du Sud
  - Ilot du Milieu
  - Ilot du Nord
  - Ilot Dubois
  - Ilot Macoa
  - Ilot Marquoix
  - Ilots Niçois
  - Ilot Salade
  - Middle Row Island
  - Noddy Rock
  - North Row Island
  - Petit Mentor
  - Petit Mentor Endans
  - Petits Ilots
  - Pink Rock
  - South Row Island
  - Table Ronde
- Cosmoledo Atoll:
  - Menai
  - Ile du Nord
  - Ile Nord-Est
  - Ile du Trou
  - Goëlettes
  - Grand Polyte
  - Petit Polyte
  - Grand Ile (Wizard)
  - Pagode
  - Ile du Sud-Ouest
  - Ile aux Moustiques
  - Ile Baleine
  - Ile aux Chauve-Souris
  - Ile aux Macaques
  - Ile aux Rats
  - Ile du Nord-Ouest
  - Ile Observation
  - Ile Sud-Est
  - Ilot la Croix
  - Astove Island
  - Assumption Island

=== Atlantic Ocean ===
==== Cabo Verde ====
- Boa Vista
- Brava
- Fogo
- Maio
- Sal
- Santa Luzia
- Santo Antão
- São Nicolau
- Santiago
- São Vicente

==== Democratic Republic of São Tomé and Príncipe ====
- Príncipe
- São Tomé Island
- Rolas

== European dependencies and territories ==
=== France ===
==== Mayotte ====
- Grande-Terre (Mayotte)
- Petite-Terre (Pamanzi)
- Chissioua Mtsamboro (Zamburu Island)

==== Réunion ====
- Réunion

==== Îles Éparses ====
- Bassas da India
- Europa Island
- Glorioso Islands
- Juan de Nova Island
- Tromelin Island

=== Italy ===
==== Pelagian Islands ====
- Lampedusa
- Linosa
- Lampione

==== Pantelleria ====
- Pantelleria

=== Spain ===
==== Canary Islands ====
- Lanzarote
- Fuerteventura, world's 237th largest island
- Gran Canaria, world's 252nd largest island
- Tenerife, world's 208th largest island
- La Gomera
- La Palma
- El Hierro
- Lobos Island
- Chinijo Archipelago
  - Alegranza
  - La Graciosa (Graciosa Island)
  - Montaña Clara
  - Roque del Este
  - Roque del Oeste

==== Chafarinas Islands ====
- Isla del Congreso
- Isla de Isabel II
- Isla del Rey

==== Alhucemas Islands ====
- Peñón de Alhucemas
- Isla de Tierra
- Isla de Mar

==== Alboran Island ====
- Isla de Alborán

==== Perejil Island ====
- Isla de Perejil

==== Santa Catalina Island ====
- Isla de Santa Catalina

=== Portugal ===
==== Azores Islands ====
- Central Group
  - Faial
  - Graciosa
  - Pico
  - São Jorge
  - Terceira
- Eastern Group
  - Santa Maria
  - São Miguel
- Western Group
  - Corvo
  - Flores

==== Madeira Islands ====
- Madeira
- Porto Santo
- Desertas
  - Deserta Grande Island
  - Bugio Island
  - Ilhéu Chão
- Cal Islet

==== Selvagens Islands (Wild Islands) ====
- Northeast Group
  - Selvagem Grande Island
  - Ilhéu Sinho (Sinho Islet)
  - Palheiro do Mar
  - Palheiro da Terra
- Southwest Group
  - Selvagem Pequena Island
  - Fora Islet
  - Ilhéu Grande

=== United Kingdom ===
==== Saint Helena, Ascension and Tristan da Cunha ====
- Saint Helena
  - Boatswain Bird Island
  - Tartar Rock
  - White Rock
  - Boatswain Bird Rock
  - Bates Rock
- Ascension Island
- Tristan da Cunha
  - Tristan da Cunha
  - Inaccessible Island
  - Nightingale Islands
    - Nightingale Island
    - Middle Island
    - Stoltenhoff Island
  - Gough Island

== Other ==
=== Botswana ===
- Sedudu
- Situngu
- Kubu Island
- Lekhubu Island
- Madinari Island

=== Democratic Republic of Congo ===
- Idjwi in Lake Kivu
- Mateba on the Congo River

=== Djibouti ===
- Maskali Island
- Moucha Island
- Sept Freres, Djibouti

=== Equatorial Guinea ===
- Annobón
- Bioko (formerly Fernando Po)
- Corisco
- Elobey Grande
- Elobey Chico

=== Eritrea ===
- Dahlak Archipelago
  - Dahlak Kebir (formerly Dehalak Deset)
  - Harmil
  - Howakil
  - Nahaleg
  - Nora
- Fatuma
- Halib
- Howakil Islands
- Massawa Island

=== Guinea ===
- Los Islands
- Tombo Island

=== Guinea-Bissau ===
- Bijagós Archipelago

=== Kenya ===
- Lamu Island
- Manda Island
- Samuli Island

=== Liberia ===
- Bushrod Island
- Providence Island

=== Malawi ===
- Chizumulu
- Likoma

=== Mozambique ===
- Angoche Island
- Bazaruto Archipelago
- Chiloane Island
- Inhaca Island
- Island of Mozambique
- Primeiras and Segundas Archipelago
- Quirimbas Islands
- Vamizi Island

=== Namibia ===
- Albatross Island
- Bird Island
- Black Rock Island
- False Plum Pudding Island
- Flamingo Island
- Halifax Island
- Mercury Island
- Impalila
- North Long Island
- Penguin Islands
- Plumpudding Island
- Pomona Island
- Possession Island
- Roastbeef Island
- Seal Island
- Shark Island
- Sinclair's Island
- South Long Island

=== Senegal ===
- Gorée
- Îles des Madeleines
- Morfil

=== Sierra Leone ===
- Banana Islands
- Bunce Island
- Sherbro Island (now Bonthe Island)
- Turtle Islands

=== Somalia ===
- Bajuni Islands
  - Addilo Island
  - Ambuu Island
  - Bandarka Island
  - Bangadini Island
  - Bantaabsi Island
  - Bavadi Island
  - Bawaadi Island
  - Bengadiiene island
  - Biramlide Island
  - Koyama (island)
- Saad ad-Din Islands
  - Aibat Island

=== South Africa ===
- Dassen Island
- Robben Island
- Seal Island
- Prince Edward Islands

=== Sudan ===
- Mukawwar Managed Nature Reserve
- Suakin Archipelago National Park

=== Tanzania ===
- Mafia Island
- Nabuyongo Island
- Pemba Island
- Ukerewe Island
- Zanzibar

=== Tunisia ===
- Djerba (Jerba)
- Galite Islands
- Kerkennah Islands
  - Chergui Island
  - Gharbi, Tunisia
- Zembra Island

=== Uganda ===
- Sese Islands

== See also ==
- List of islands
- List of islands in the Atlantic Ocean
- List of islands in the Mediterranean
- List of islands in the Indian Ocean
- List of islands in the Red Sea
