= Wizard Reef =

Coral reef in the Seychelles

Nickname: Récif Wizard
- Location within Seychelles

Geography
- Location: Indian Ocean
- Coordinates: 08°48′S 51°03′E
- Archipelago: Seychelles
- Adjacent to: Indian Ocean
- Total islands: 1
- Major islands: Wizard
- Area: 0.02 km^{2} (0.0077 sq mi)
- Highest elevation: 0.1 m (0.3 ft)

Administration
- Seychelles
- Group: Outer Islands
- Sub-Group: Farquhar Group
- Districts: Outer Islands District

Demographics
- Population: 0 (2014)
- Pop. density: 0/km^{2} (0/sq mi)
- Ethnic groups: Creole, French, East Africans, Indians.

Additional information
- Time zone: SCT (UTC+4)
- ISO code: SC-26
- Official website: Official Webpage

Wizard Reef (French: Récif Wizard) is a coral reef in the Farquhar Group in the Outer Islands of the Seychelles. It is 670 km (362 nmi; 416 mi) southwest of the capital, Victoria, on Mahé Island.

== History ==
Wizard Reef was named after Fairfax Moresby's ship Wizard, which visited the reef in 1822.

== Geography ==
Wizard Reef is roughly elliptical. It measures 1.7 km (0.92 nmi; 1.1 mi) east-to–west and 1.2 km (0.65 nmi; 0.75 mi) north-to–south, covering an area of about 1.6 km^{2} (0.47 sq nmi; 0.62 sq mi). The land mass is barely 0.02 km^{2} (0.0077 sq mi). It is barely above water, as the sea breaks heavily over it. The reef's islet is in the western half. The location is 41 km (22 nmi; 25 mi) north of the northern tip of Providence Atoll.

== Administration ==
Wizard Reef belongs to Outer Islands District.

== Flora and fauna ==
The islet has many hawksbill turtles nesting.

== Gallery ==
Map 1

District Map
