= L'Islette Island =

Island in Seychelles

- Location within Seychelles

Geography
- Location: Seychelles, Indian Ocean
- Coordinates: 4°39′S 55°24′E
- Archipelago: Inner Islands, Seychelles
- Adjacent to: Indian Ocean
- Total islands: 1
- Major islands: L'Islette
- Area: 0.034 km^{2} (0.013 sq mi)
- Length: 0.3 km (0.19 mi)
- Width: 0.12 km (0.075 mi)
- Coastline: 0.9 km (0.56 mi)
- Highest elevation: 10 m (30 ft)
- Highest point: L'Islette

Administration
- Seychelles
- Group: Granitic Seychelles
- Sub-Group: Mahe Islands
- Sub-Group: Port Glaud Islands
- Districts: Port Glaud
- Largest settlement: L'Islette

Demographics
- Population: 0 (2014)
- Pop. density: 0/km^{2} (0/sq mi)
- Ethnic groups: Creole, French, East Africans, Indians.

Additional information
- Time zone: SCT (UTC+4)
- ISO code: SC-21
- Official website: www.seychelles.org/beaches/anse-lislette-lans-lilet

L'Islette Island is an island in Seychelles, located 250 meters from the western coast of the island of Mahe, in the bay of Port Glaud. It is also near Thérèse Island which lies to its southwest and Petite Island which lies to its east. L'Islette Island is a granite island densely covered with tropical vegetation (trees and shrubs).

== Administration ==
The island belongs to Port Glaud District.

== Tourism ==
Today, the island's main industry is tourism. It once had a restaurant managed by Constance Ephelia resort on nearby Mahe, but today it is closed. The island was recently purchased by local entrepreneur Mary Geers who plans to build a resort on the island, but meanwhile she is filming the reality The island of love from Russian channel TNT on the island.

== Image gallery ==
Map 1

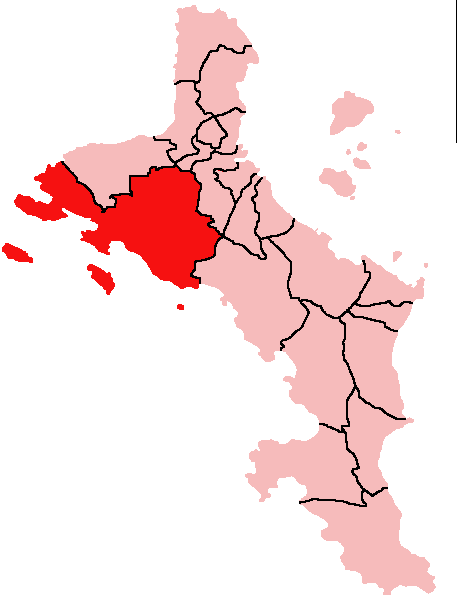
District Map

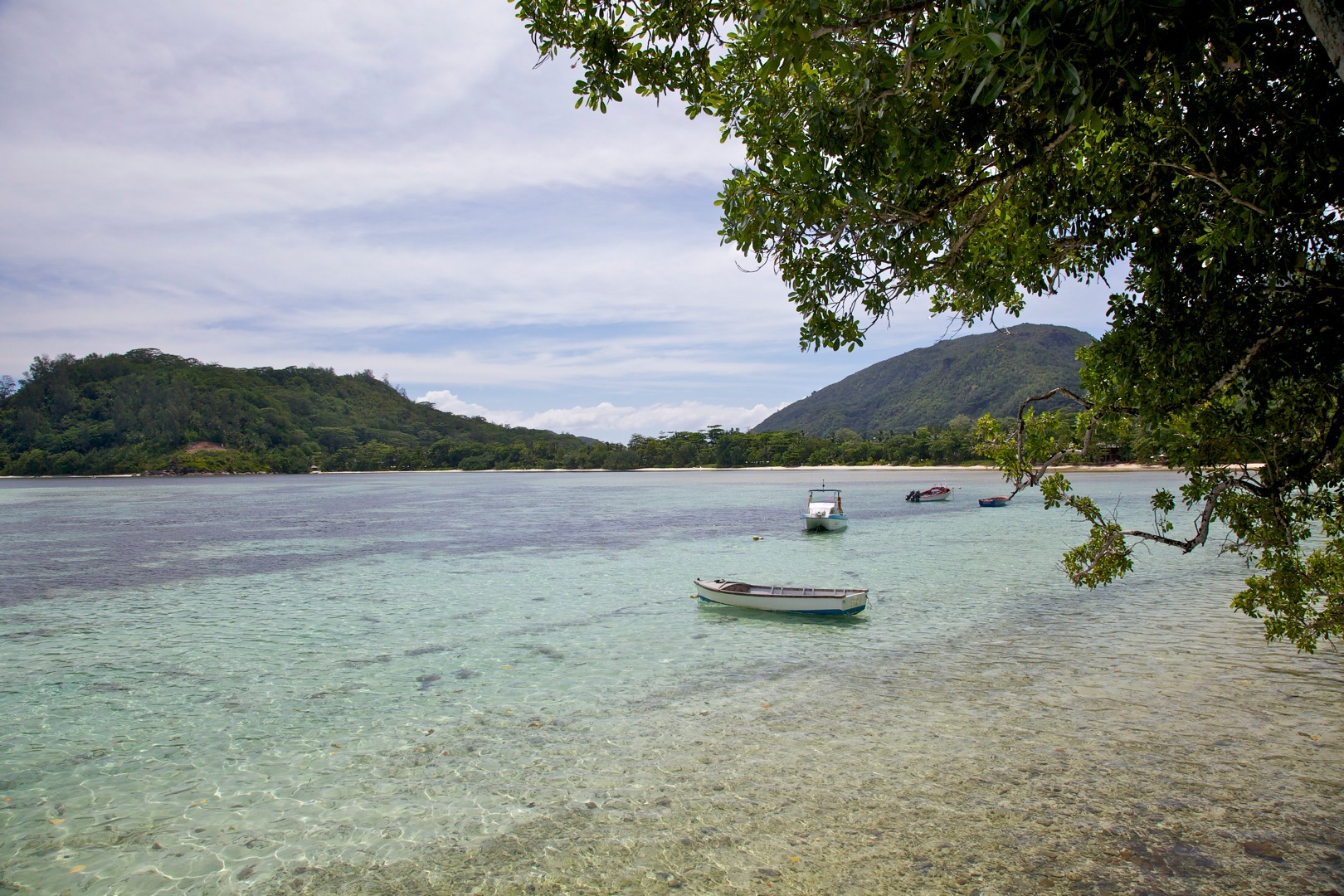
Bateaux@AnseL’Islette

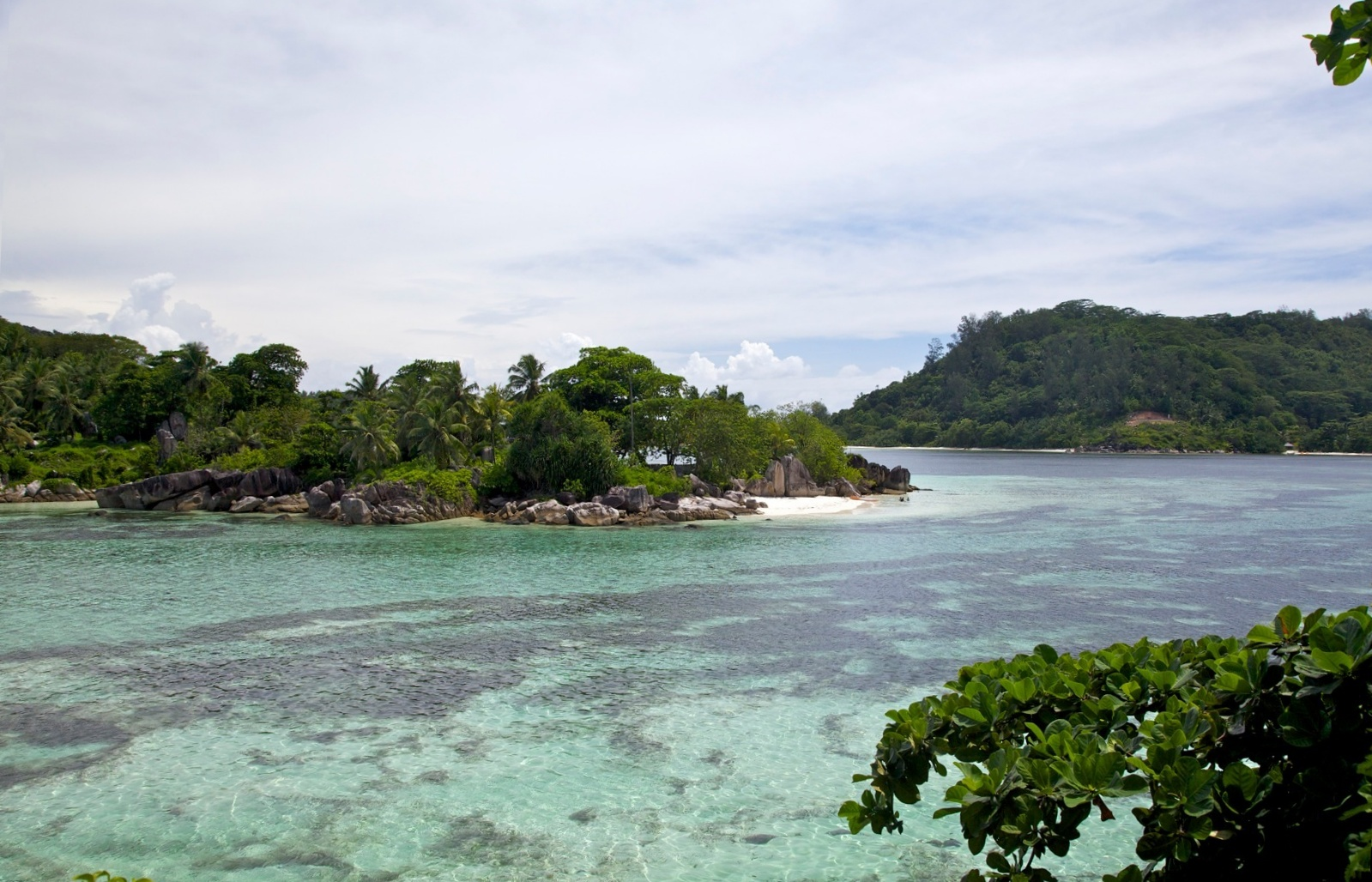
AnseL’Islette
