= List of protected areas of Sudan =

The protected areas of Sudan include national parks, marine national parks, wildlife sanctuaries, bird sanctuaries, game reserves, nature conservation areas, and managed nature reserves.

== National parks ==
- Dinder National Park
- Jebel Hassania National Park
- Radom National Park
- Suakin Archipelago National Park

== Marine national parks ==
- Port Sudan Marine National Park
- Sanganeb Atoll Marine National Park

== Wildlife sanctuaries ==
- Erkawit Wildlife Sanctuary
- Erkawit Sinkat Wildlife Sanctuary

== Bird sanctuaries ==
- Jebel Aulia Dam Bird Sanctuary
- Lake Keilak Bird Sanctuary
- Lake Kundi Bird Sanctuary
- Lake Nubia Bird Sanctuary

== Game reserves ==
- Tokor Game Reserve
- Sabaloka Game Reserve

== Nature conservation areas ==
- Jebel Marra Nature Conservation Area
- Jebel Elba Nature Conservation Area

== Managed nature reserves ==
- Mukawwar Managed Nature Reserve

== International designations ==
=== Biosphere reserves ===
- Dinder National Park
- Radom National Park

=== World Heritage Sites ===
- Sanganeb Marine National Park and Dungonab Bay - Mukkawar Island Marine National Park

=== Ramsar Sites ===
- Dongonab Bay-Marsa Waiai
- Suakin-Gulf of Agig
- Dinder National Park
