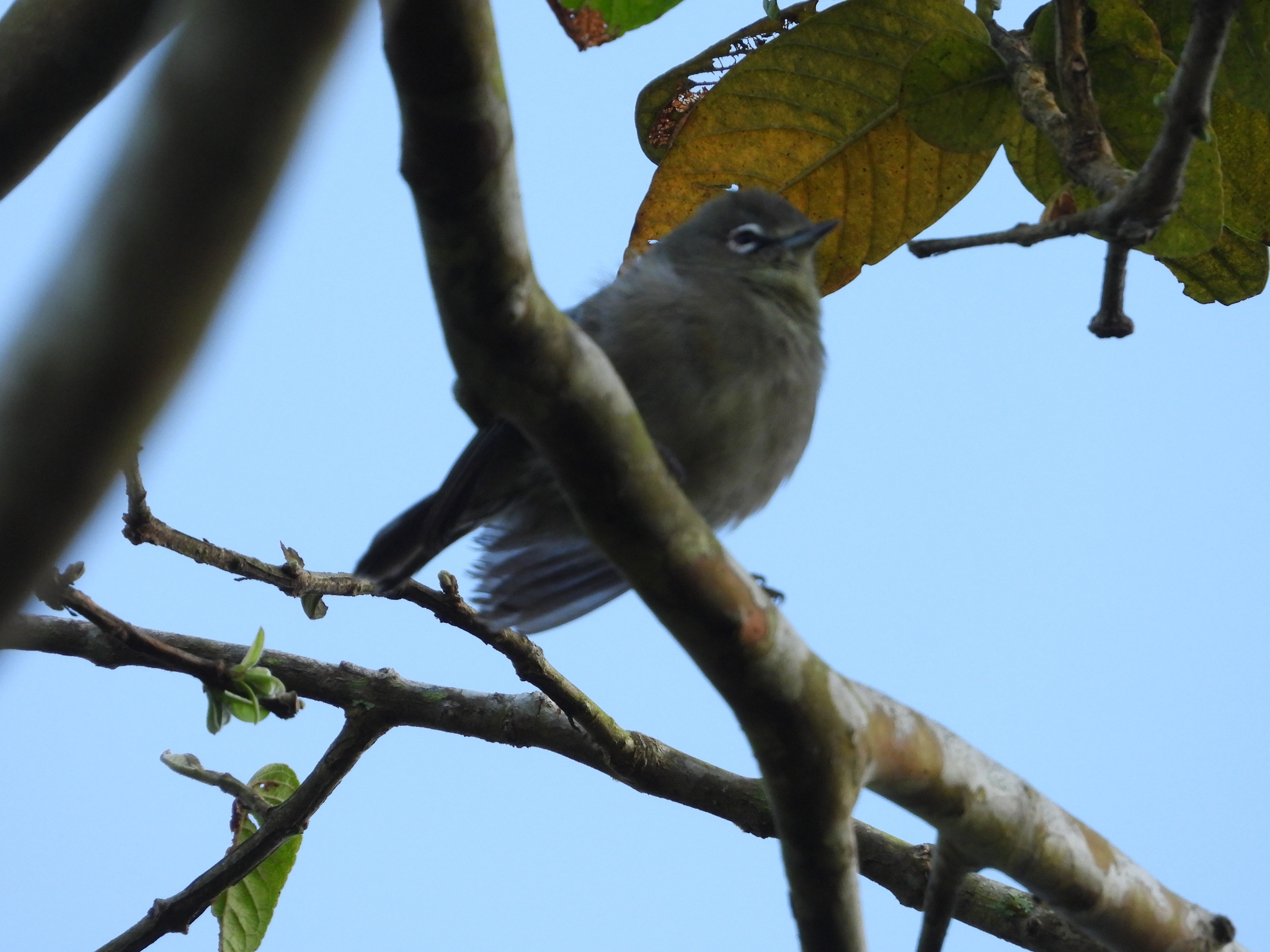

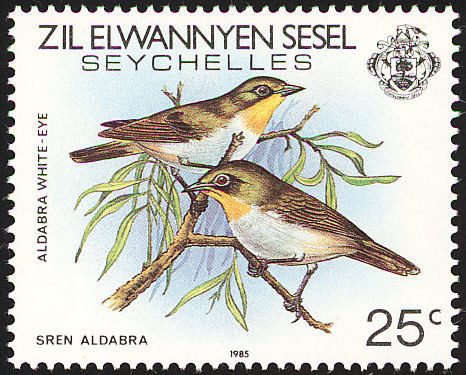

Conservation status
- Vulnerable (IUCN 3.1)

Scientific classification
- Kingdom: Animalia
- Phylum: Chordata
- Class: Aves
- Order: Passeriformes
- Family: Zosteropidae
- Genus: Zosterops
- Species: Z. modestus

Binomial name
- Zosterops modestus E. Newton, 1867

= Seychelles white-eye =

Species of bird

The Seychelles white-eye (Zosterops modestus) is a rare warbler-like perching bird from the family of white-eyes (Zosteropidae). It is endemic to the Seychelles. At one time thought to be extinct, it was rediscovered and is now listed as Vulnerable by the IUCN.

== Description ==
This ten-to-eleven-centimetre (3.9 to 4.3 in) long bird has a plumage of olive-grey upper-parts and dull-coloured underparts. It is further characterized by a narrow, white eye-ring, a rather long dark-grey tail and a small sharp bill. Its diet consists of insect larvae, locusts, and grasshoppers as well as berries and seeds. The Seychelles white-eye's breeding season is from September to April, in which a clutch of two to seven eggs is laid into a cup-shaped nest. The incubation time is thirteen to fifteen days and the young are fully fledged after eleven to sixteen days. After that, adults look after their young for another two months. The species' melodious and complex song consists of nasal tones. Due to its ecology and foraging habits (in the canopy of high trees) it is difficult to observe.

The existence of a complex cooperative breeding system was discovered among Seychelles white-eyes. It is apparently unique among all species of white-eyes and appears as a very peculiar social breeding organisation among birds in general. Within the same breeding territory, the individual composition of nesting groups constantly changes, often involving birds that sometimes also contribute to nests in other territories.

== Threats ==
Zosterops modestus was thought to be extinct between 1935 and 1960 until it was rediscovered in the highlands of Mahé. Even in 1996 it was considered one of the rarest birds in the world, with a population of only 25-35 individuals. The dramatic decline in population was caused by the extensive clearing of forests, competition with introduced birds (especially with the common myna), and from rat predation. In 1997, a population of about 250 individuals was rediscovered on the island of Conception. In 1998, the population on Mahé was estimated to be about 50. Currently the population on Conception Island consists of between 244 and 336 individuals. In 2001, the Island Conservation Society led a project to transfer 31 birds to the Seychelles island of Frégate. The population has since increased to more than 60 birds. Further transfers of birds have been made to North Island, Seychelles and to Cousine Island. Birds subsequently died out on Cousine, but transfers to other islands have been successful, increasing the world population to perhaps 500.
