= St. Pierre Island, Farquhar =

Island in Seychelles

St. Pierre Island
Nickname: Île St. Pierre
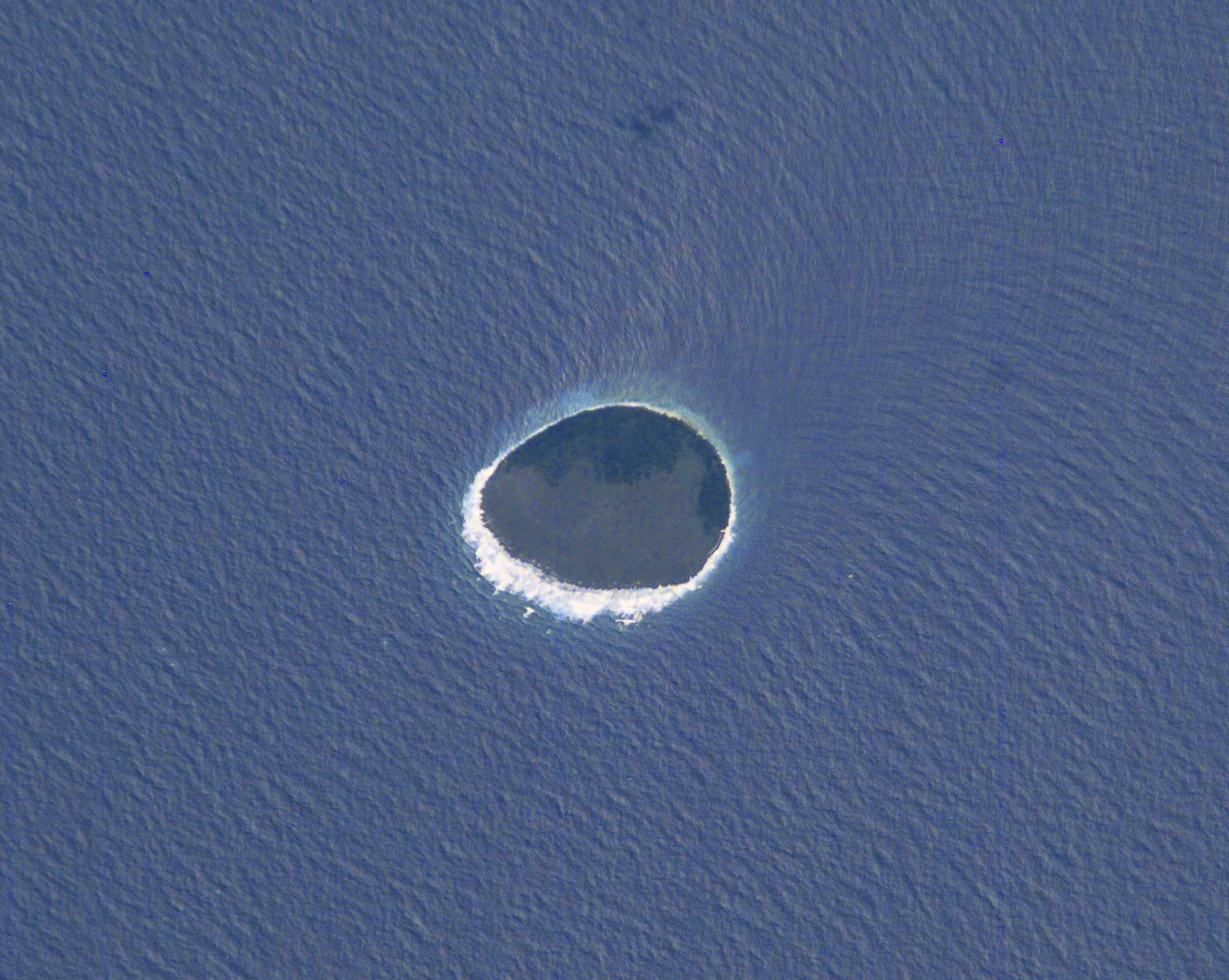
- NASA picture of St. Pierre Island

- Location within Seychelles

Geography
- Location: Indian Ocean
- Coordinates: 09°17′S 50°44′E
- Archipelago: Seychelles
- Adjacent to: Indian Ocean
- Total islands: 1
- Major islands: St. Pierre
- Area: 1.64 km^{2} (0.63 sq mi)
- Length: 1.3 km (0.81 mi)
- Width: 1.55 km (0.963 mi)
- Coastline: 4.6 km (2.86 mi)
- Highest elevation: 16 m (52 ft)

Administration
- Seychelles
- Group: Outer Islands
- Sub-Group: Farquhar Group
- Outer Islands District
- Largest settlement: St. Pierre village (pop. 0)

Demographics
- Population: 0 (2014)
- Pop. density: 0/km^{2} (0/sq mi)
- Ethnic groups: Creole, French, East Africans, Indians.

Additional information
- Time zone: SCT (UTC+4)
- ISO code: SC-26
- Official website: www.seychelles.travel/en/discover/the-islands/outer-islands

St. Pierre Island is a raised reef island west of Providence Atoll and part of Farquhar Group, which belongs to the Outer Islands of the Seychelles. It has a distance of 736 km (457 mi) southwest of the capital, Victoria, on Mahé Island.

== History ==
St. Pierre Island bears the name of one of Captain Dechemin's ships, who visited the island on 6 June 1732.

In former times, much of the island was covered with a Pisonia grandis forest, in which large numbers of seabirds nested. The coral rock was thus covered with guano. The guano, and since the 1950s also the rock and sand into which the phosphate had been leached, were mined away between 1906 and 1972 converting an island once densely forested to the current barren, pitted landscape. During that time, a small workers' settlement existed in the NW of St Pierre, which depended on supplies shipped in from abroad.

== Geography ==
The island is located 34 km west of Cerf Island of Providence Atoll, and 462 km east of Aldabra. This uninhabited island is nearly circular, 1.6 km (0.99 mi) east-west by 1.3 km (0.81 mi) north-south, with a land area of 1.64 square kilometres (0.63 square miles). St. Pierre has a gently sloping seabed on the exposed southeastern coast and a steep drop off on the northwest, where the fringing reef is all but absent.

== Geology ==
The seaward faces of St. Pierre Island are abrupt and undercut fossil coral cliffs, 2.0 to 4.3 m (6.6–14.1 ft) high and broken at one point only by a 5-metre-wide (16 ft) inlet to a cove with sandy bottom. Thus St Pierre Island is virtually inaccessible from the sea. In the center is a depression more or less of sea level. The ceaseless sea swell has undercut these faces; jets of water are thrown up in many places by each wave as it strikes blowholes worn out of the coral, depositing dunes of sand and coral debris up to 10 m (33 ft) inland. At the southeast shore of the island, the wearing-away has caused the formation of flat shelves, and the entire island is honeycombed by caverns washed out by the sea. Due to this, no source of fresh water exists on St Pierre.

== Demographics ==
Today St. Pierre Island is uninhabited, but in modern times it was inhabited for some periods. There is a derelict jetty at the ruined settlement on the north west shore, which is accessible by boat in the calmest weather only.

== Administration ==
The island belongs to Outer Islands District.

== Flora and fauna ==
Today the island is barren except for a clump of Casuarina equisetifolia trees up 12 m (40 ft) high on its northwestern part, covering a third of the land area. The trees were originally planted as windbreak for the mining camp, and have unexpectedly thrived and spread. Most of the plant species once found on St Pierre are now gone, including the Pisonia, Suicide Tree (Cerbera odollam) and rosemallow (Hibiscus tiliaceus). Some Pemphis acidula might persist.

By about 1960, it was noted that the most common herbaceous plant was Stachytarpheta indica, while the introduced Indian Blanketflower (Gaillardia pulchella) had established itself widely. Sisal (Agave sisalana), Chinese violet (Asystasia gangetica), Papaya (Carica papaya), Jimsonweed (Datura stramonium) and bananas (Musa) were found around the mining camp. Whether any of these has survived is not known, though the dropseed grass Sporobolus virginicus which was found in abundance on the dunes probably has. The oonopid monotypic spider species Farqua quadrimaculata is the only known spider that is endemic to the Farquhar Islands.

== Image gallery ==
Map 1

District map of the Outer Islands
