= Port Glaud =

Coordinates: 4°39′S 55°24′E

- District

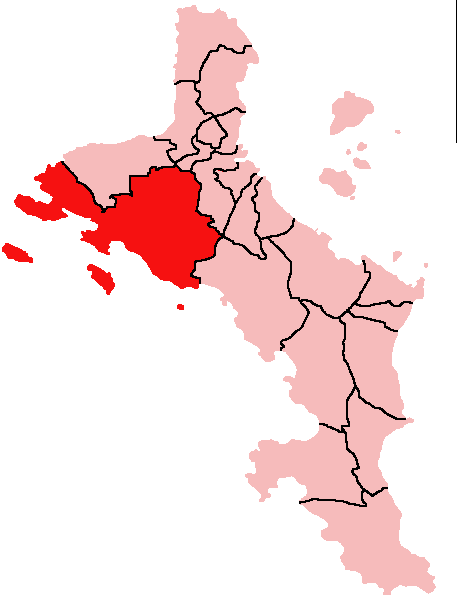
- Location within Mahé Island, Seychelles
- Country: Seychelles

Government
  - District Administrator: Leonne Florentine
  - Member of National Assembly: Hon. Egbert Aglae (PL)

Population (2019 Estimate)
  - Total: 3,082
- Time zone: Seychelles Time

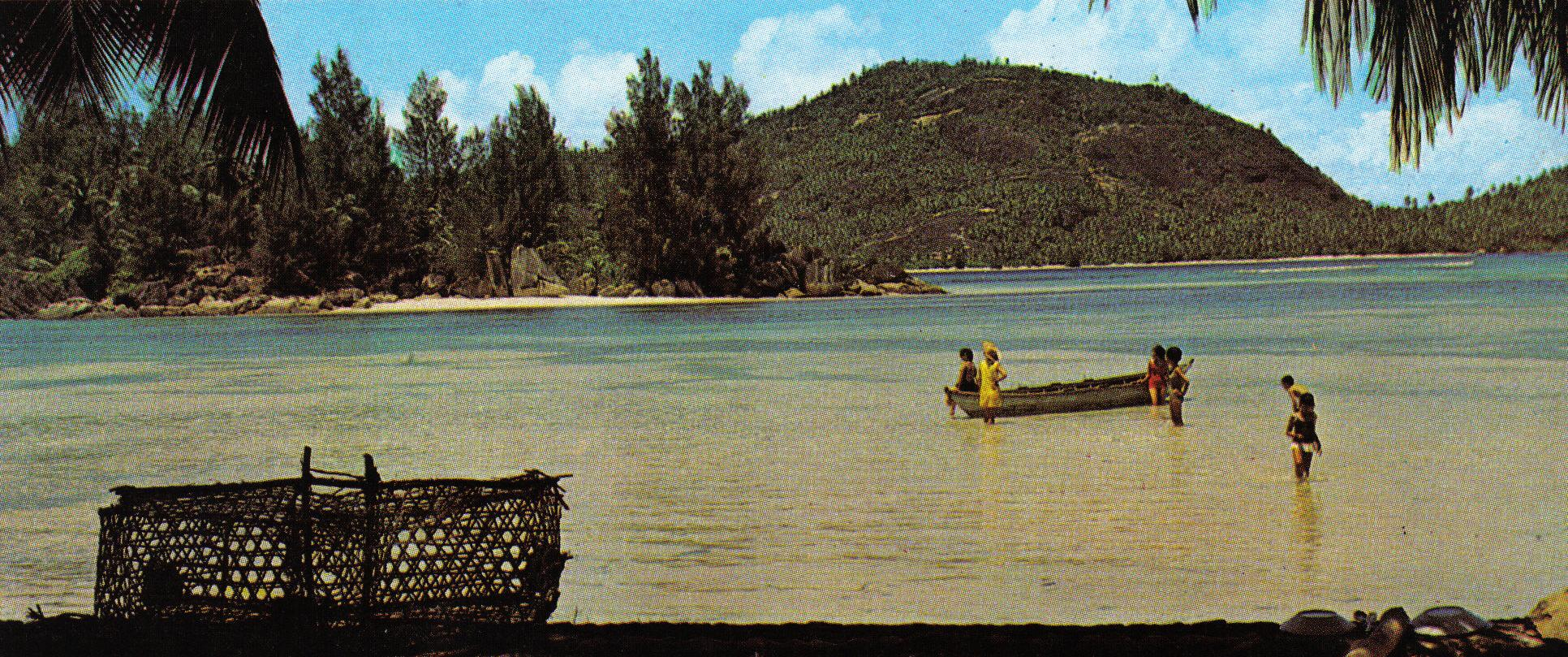
A locality in the Port Glaud district - early 1970s

Port Glaud (French pronunciation: [pɔʁ ɡlo]) is an administrative district of Seychelles located on the northwestern coast of the island of Mahé. It is 25 km^{2} and has a population of 2174 (2002 census). The main village is Port Glaud. The district contains two marine parks; Bay Ternay & Port Launay. The offshore islands of Thérèse Island and Conception Island are part of Port Glaud District.
