= Nubian Swell =

Geological structure in northern Africa

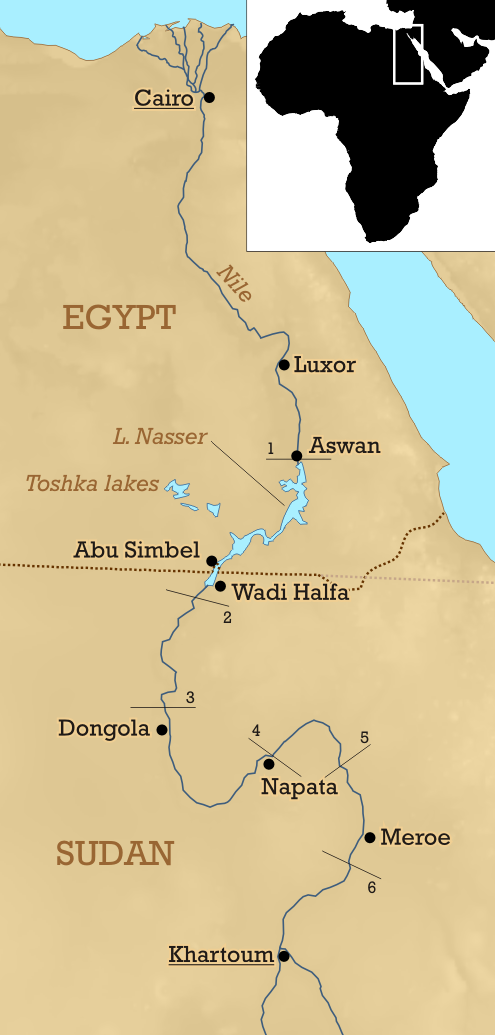
The six cataracts of the Nile to the Nubian Swell

The Nubian Swell is a geologic structural uplift in northern Africa that trends east to west and separates the lower Nile of Egypt from the Sudan basin. The Nubian Swell has been geologically active since early Mesozoic times, and portions of it are still active. The Nile traverses the uplift through geologic fractures and faults, and four of six cataracts of the Nile occur at places that the river crosses the uplift.
