= Farquhar Group =

Group of Islands in the Outer Islands of the Seychelles

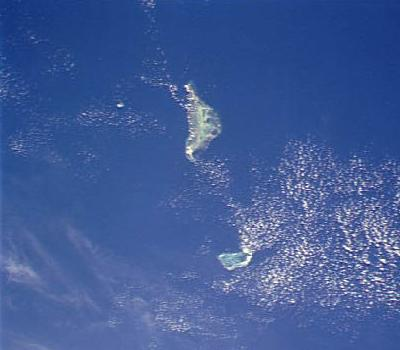
- Farquhar Group: Providence Atoll at the top, St. Pierre Island to the left of Providence Atoll, Farquhar Atoll at the bottom

- Location within Seychelles

Geography
- Location: Indian Ocean
- Coordinates: 10°10′S 51°10′E
- Archipelago: Seychelles
- Area: 13.567 km^{2} (5.238 sq mi)

Administration
- Seychelles
- Group: Outer Islands
- Sub-Group: Farquhar Group
- Districts: Outer Islands District
- Largest settlement: Grande Poste (pop. 20)

Demographics
- Population: 20 (2016)
- Pop. density: 1.56/km^{2} (4.04/sq mi)
- Ethnic groups: Creole, French, East Africans, Indians.

Additional information
- Time zone: SCT (UTC+4)
- ISO code: SC-26
- Official website: www.seychelles.travel/en/discover/the-islands/outer-islands

The Farquhar Group belong to the Outer Islands of the Seychelles, lying in the southwest of the island nation, more than 700 km (430 mi) southwest of the capital, Victoria, on Mahé Island.

== Area ==
The total land area of all islands in the group is less than 12.837 km^{2} (4.956 sq mi), but the total area of the atolls measures about 370 km^{2} (140 sq mi).

The group consists of two atolls and one separate island. In addition, there are a couple of submerged reefs in the area:

1. Farquhar Atoll (with two larger and about eight smaller islets)
2. Providence Atoll (with 2 islets, Providence Island and Cerf Island)
3. St. Pierre Island
4. Wizard Reef
5. Umzinto Bank (submerged)
6. Bulldog Bank (submerged)
7. McLeod Bank (submerged)

== Population ==
There is one settlement, located on Île du Nord (North Island) of Farquhar Atoll. There is an abandoned village on Providence Island of Providence Atoll. There are records of Maldivian mariner presence in the group from the 20th century, when a trading vessel from southern Maldives lost its course and reached Providence Atoll.

== Biology ==
The oonopid monotypic spider species Farqua quadrimaculata is the only known spider that is endemic to the Farquhar Islands.
