= Cataracts of the Nile =

Series of six whitewater rapids

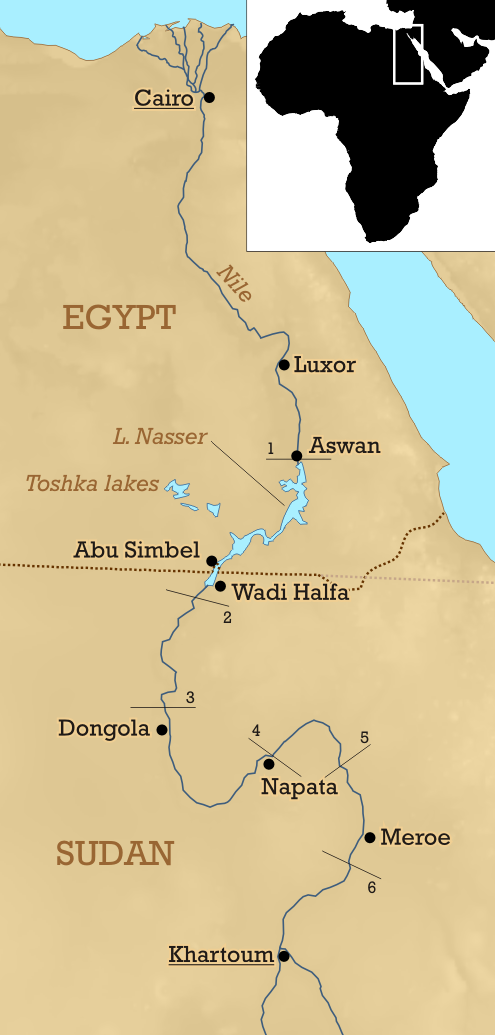
The six cataracts of the Nile

The Cataracts of the Nile are shallow lengths (or whitewater rapids) of the Nile river, between Khartoum and Aswan, where the surface of the water is broken by many small boulders and stones jutting out of the river bed, as well as many rocky islets. In some places, these stretches are punctuated by whitewater, while at others the water flow is smoother but still shallow.

== The Six Cataracts ==
Counted going upstream (from north to south):

In Egypt:

- The First Cataract was a stretch 17 kilometres (11 mi) of shallow faster flowing rocky rapids located just south of Aswan (24.0354°N 32.8721°E). The river dropped gently only 1.2 metres (3.9 ft)} down to a elevation of 84 metres (276 ft) at Aswan, featuring granite outcroppings. Its former location was selected for the construction of Aswan Low Dam, the first dam built across the Nile, and since 1902, is submerged under the tailwater of the reservoir of what later became Lake Nasser.

In Sudan:

- The Second Cataract (or Great Cataract) was in Nubia and is now submerged under Lake Nasser. It is located 10 km south of the former site of Wadi Halfa, at the current location of the town (21.8115°N 31.2159°E)
- The Third Cataract is at Tombos/Hannek. (19.7135°N 30.3729°E)
- The Fourth Cataract is in the Manasir Desert, and since 2008, is submerged under the reservoir of Merowe Dam. (18.91°N 32.36°E)
- The Fifth Cataract is between Abu Hamad and Atbara, Sudan. (18.3856°N 33.7769°E)
- The Sixth Cataract is where the Nile cuts through the Sabaloka pluton, close to Bagrawiyah. (16.29°N 32.67°E)

== Geology ==
Geologists indicate that the region of northern Sudan is tectonically active and this activity has caused the river to take on "youthful" characteristics. The Nubian Swell has diverted the river's course to the west, while keeping its depth shallow and causing the formation of the cataracts. Even as the river bed is worn down by erosion, the landmass is lifted, keeping parts of the river bed exposed. These distinctive features of the river between Aswan and Khartoum have led to the stretch being often referred to as the Cataract Nile, while the downstream portion is occasionally referred to as the "Egyptian" Nile. The geological distinction between these two portions of the river is considerable. North of Aswan, the river bed is not rocky, but is instead composed of sediment, and far from being a shallow river. It is believed that the bedrock was previously eroded to be several thousand feet deep. This created a vast canyon that is now filled with sediment.

Despite these characteristics, some of the cataracts which are normally impassable by boat because of the shallow water have become navigable during the flood season.

== History ==
The word "cataract" comes from the Greek word καταρρέω ("to flow down"), although the original Greek term was the plural-only Κατάδουποι. However, contrary to this, none of the Nile's six primary cataracts could be accurately described as waterfalls, and given a broader definition, this is the same with many of the minor cataracts.

In ancient times, Upper Egypt extended from south of the Nile Delta to the first cataract, while further upstream, the land was controlled by the ancient Kingdom of Kush that would later take over Egypt from 760 to 656 BC. Besides the Kushite invasion, for most of Egyptian history, the Nile's cataracts, particularly the First Cataract, primarily served as a natural border to prevent most crossings from the south, as those in said region would rely on river travel to venture north and south. This allowed Egypt's southern border to be relatively protected from invasions, and besides brief Kushite rule, it remained a natural border for most of Egyptian history.

Eratosthenes gave a precise description of the Cataract-Nile:

It has a similar shape to a backwards letter N. It flows northward from Meroë about 2700 stadia, then turns back to the south and the winter sunset for about 3700 stadia, and it almost reaches the same parallel as the Meroë region and makes its way far into Libya. Then it makes another turn, and flows northward 5300 stadia to the great cataract, curving slightly to the east; then 1200 stadia to the smaller cataract at Syene (i.e. Aswan), and then 5300 more to the sea.

The six cataracts of the Nile are depicted extensively by European visitors, notably by Winston Churchill in The River War (1899), where he recounts the exploits of the British trying to return to the Sudan between 1896 and 1898, after they were forced to leave in 1885.

Today, Lake Nasser has filled most of the area between the first and second cataracts (known as Lower Nubia), and its monuments moved as part of the International Campaign to Save the Monuments of Nubia.

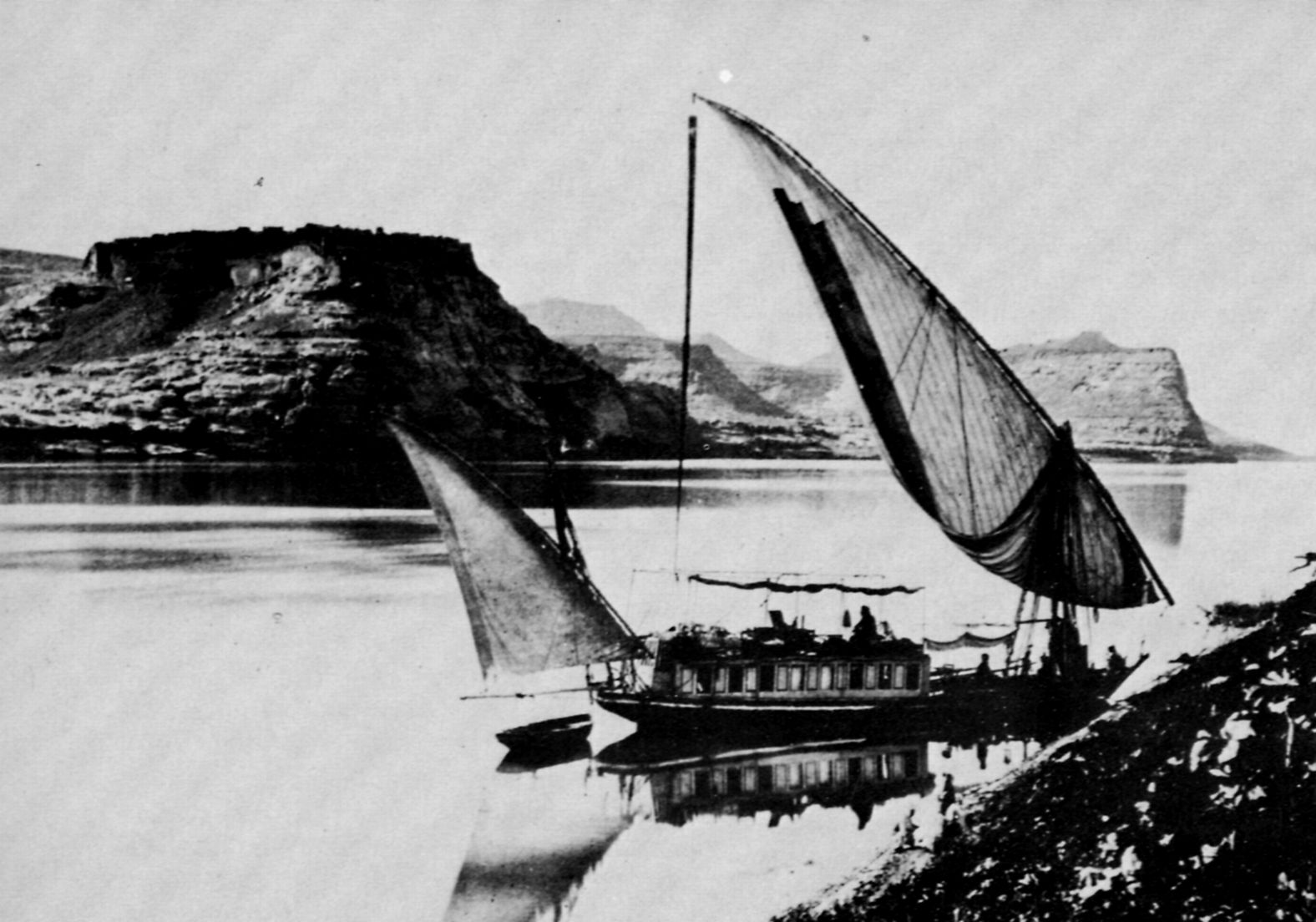
Boat travelling to the Second Cataract of the Nile carrying photographer Francis Frith (period 1850-98)

== Gallery ==
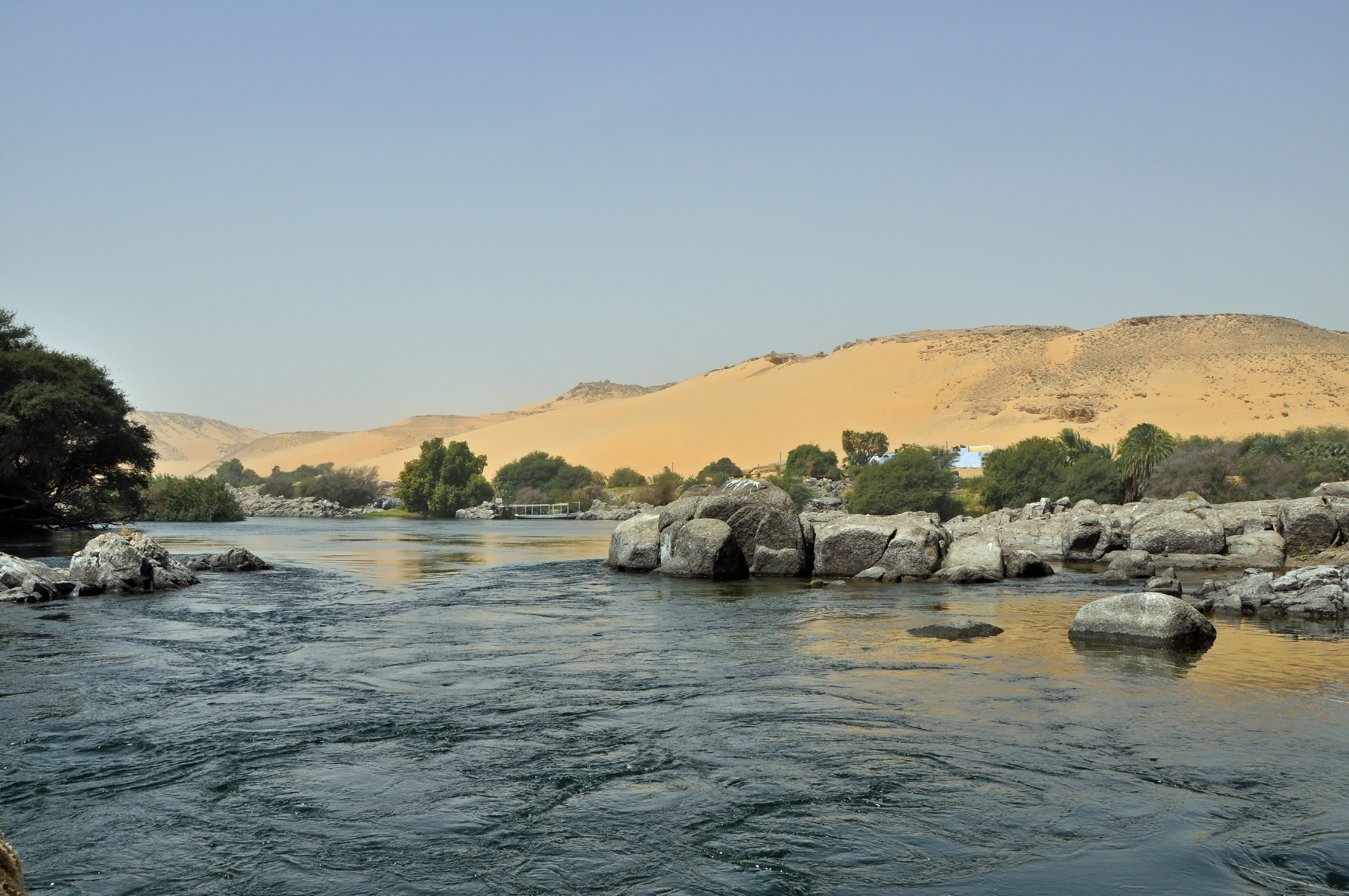
First Cataract

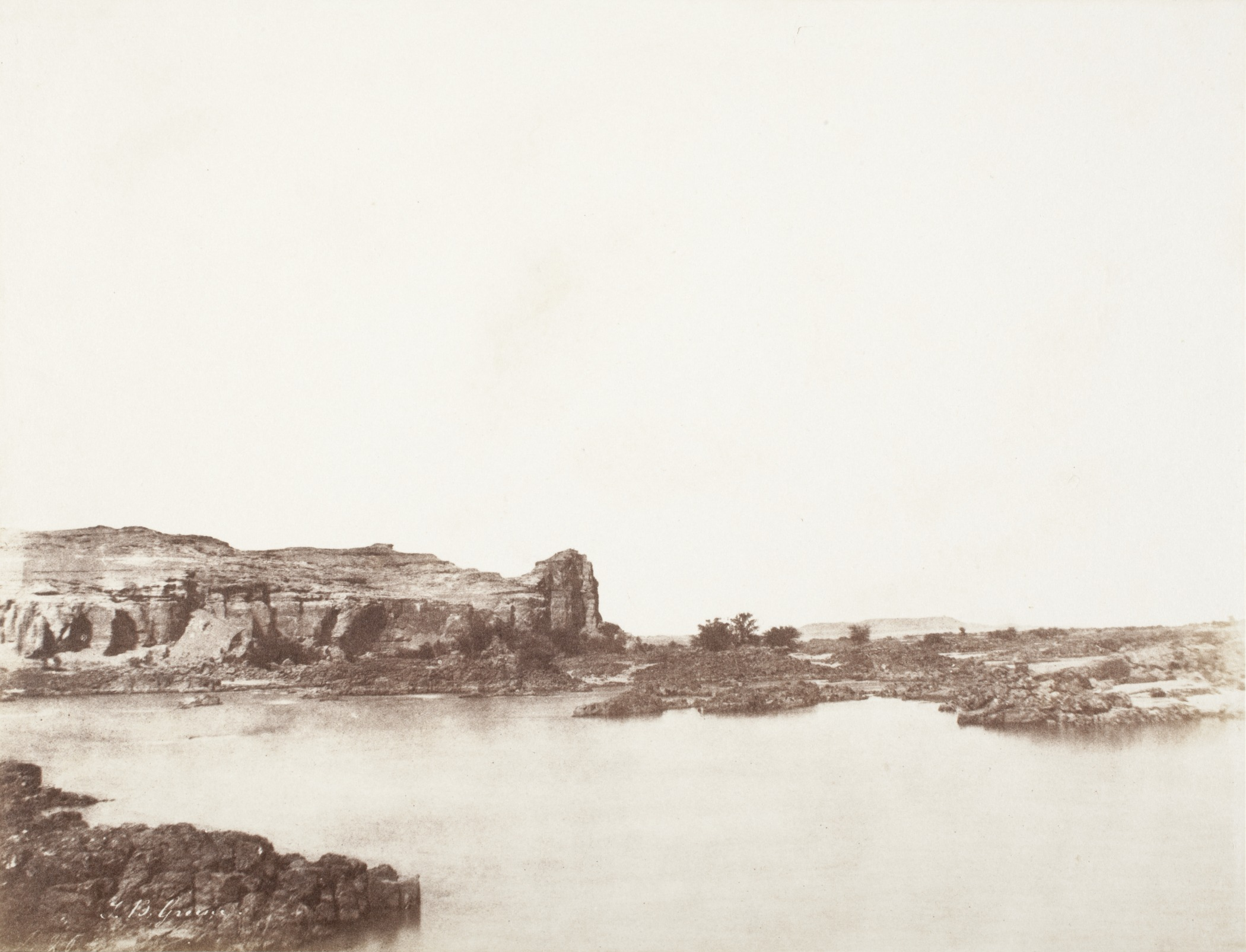
Second cataract in 1854 by John Beasley Greene

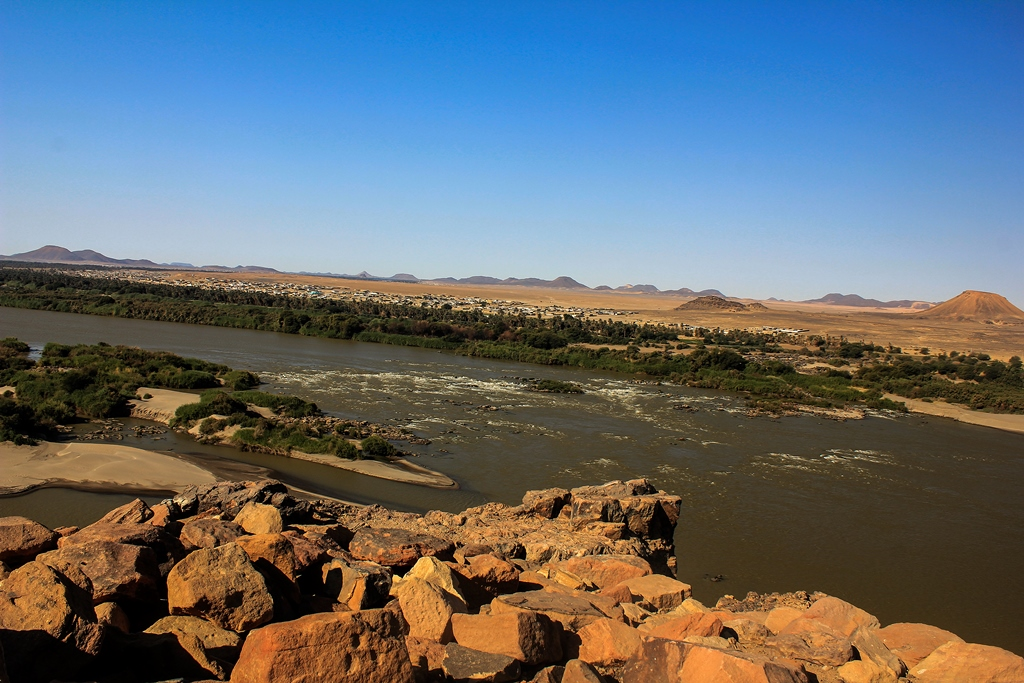
Third Cataract

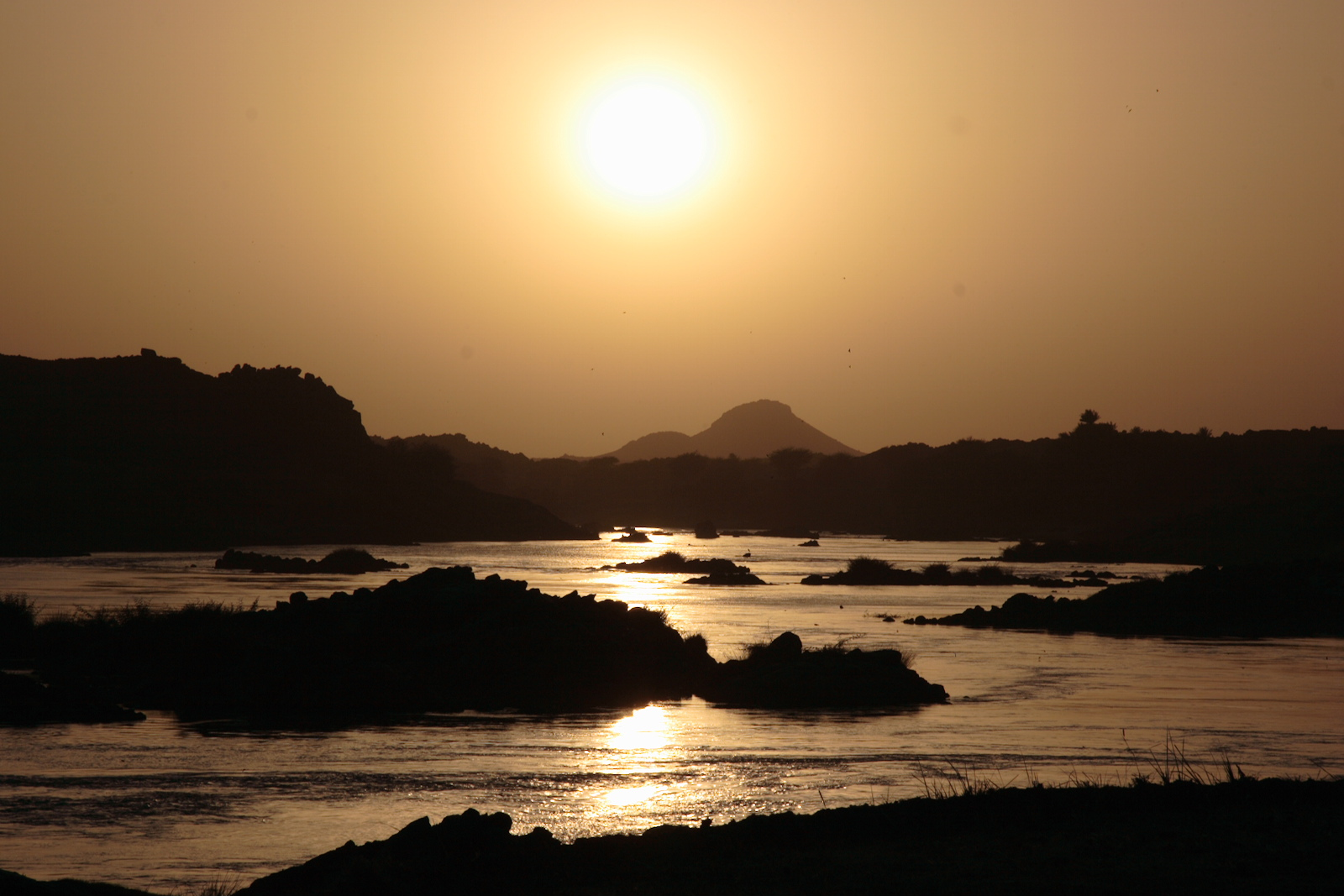
Fourth Cataract

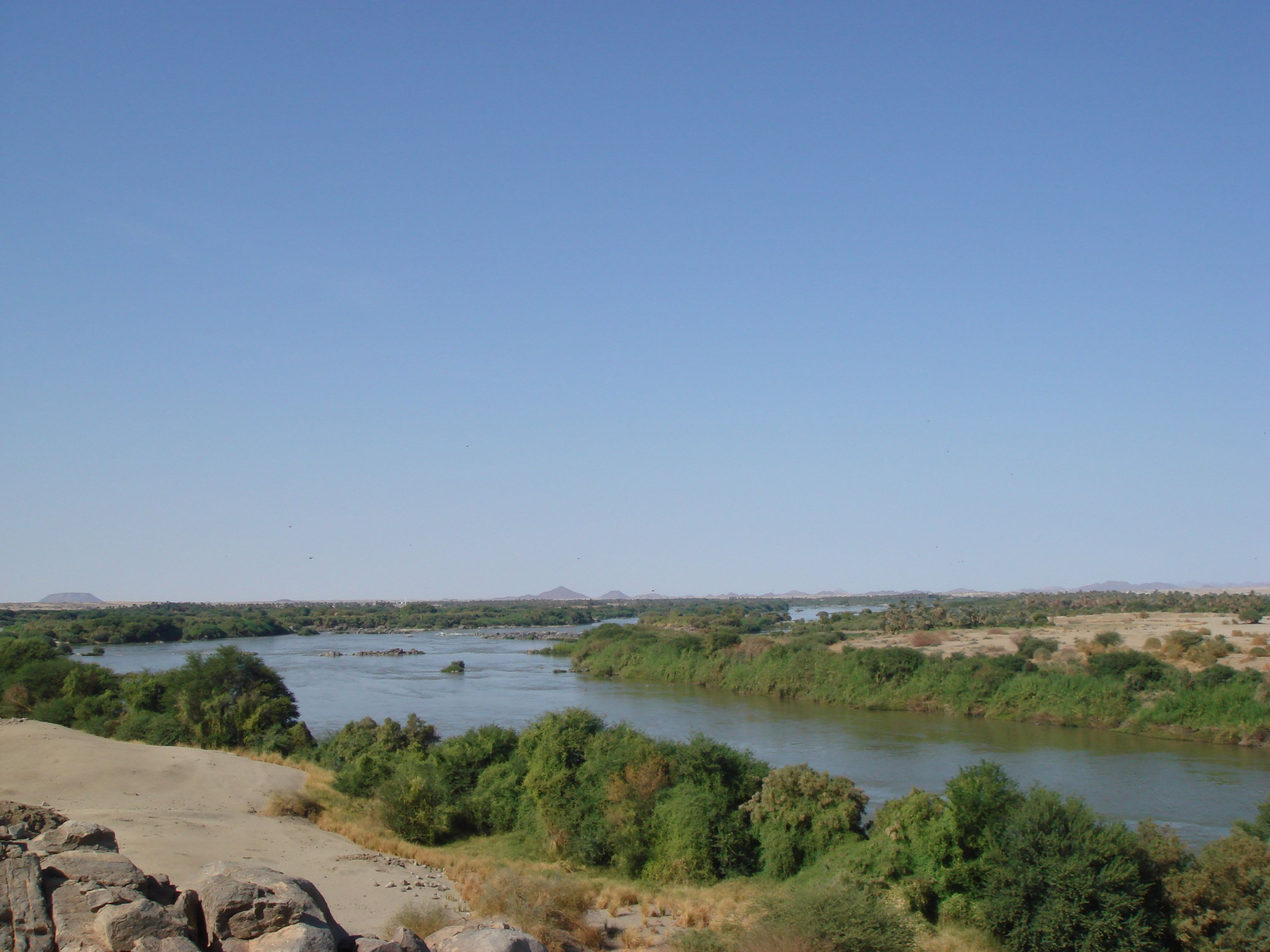
Fifth Cataract

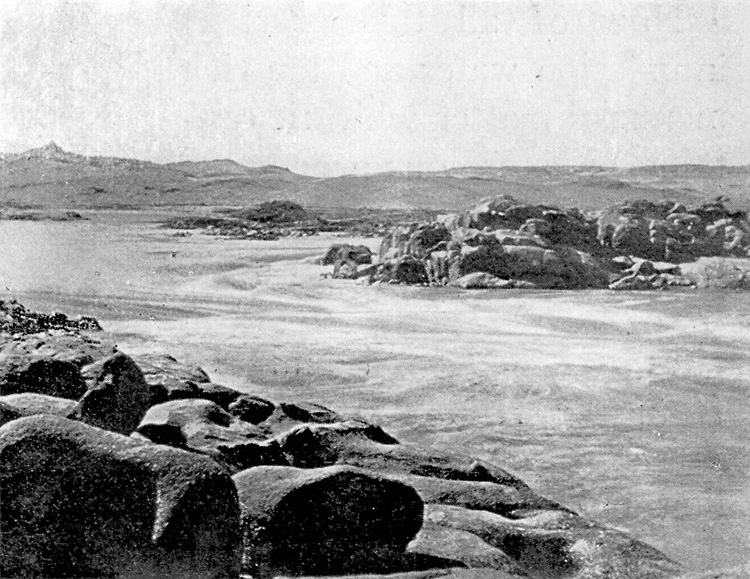
Sixth Cataract in 1908 by Sir Henry Rider Haggard
