= Mmatshumo =

Village in Botswana

Coordinates: 21°8′44″S 25°39′36″E

Location of Mmatshumo

Mmatshumo is a village in the Boteti District in Botswana. The village was established around 1939–1941 as a results of severe drought experienced in Mopipi. The establishment was effected at the same time with that of Letlhakane, Mosu and Gweta villages.The inhibitants are of diverse tribes (Bakaa, Bakalaka, Bateti, Bakhurutshe, Basarwa, Kololo people/Barotsi, Bangwato and some remnants of Bakgatla) who live harmoniously together and intermary. The inhabitants practice agriculture to sustain themselves. The village is located close to the Makgadikgadi Pan. An area of wide open uninhabited spaces with endless horizons i.e. the remains of what used to be the largest ancient mainland superlake. The village is a gate way to Lekhubu Island The village has administrative offices i.e. kgotla currently headed by kgosi Phetsogang, primary school, postoffice, bars (with the famous Land and Camp leading the pack especially during holidays), shops and a health clinic. In the north of Mmatshumo village lies Khubu Island aka Gaio and in the south of this village lies Damtshaa diamond mine operated by Debswana Company. The road linking Letlhakane in the south to Mmatshumo is tarred. Due to the diamond mining activities in the vicinity of this village, it is expected to see population and business boom in the coming years. According to 2022 Botswana Population and Housing Census, Mmatshumo and associated localities had a total population of 1719.
