= Morne Seychellois =

Highest peak in Seychelles

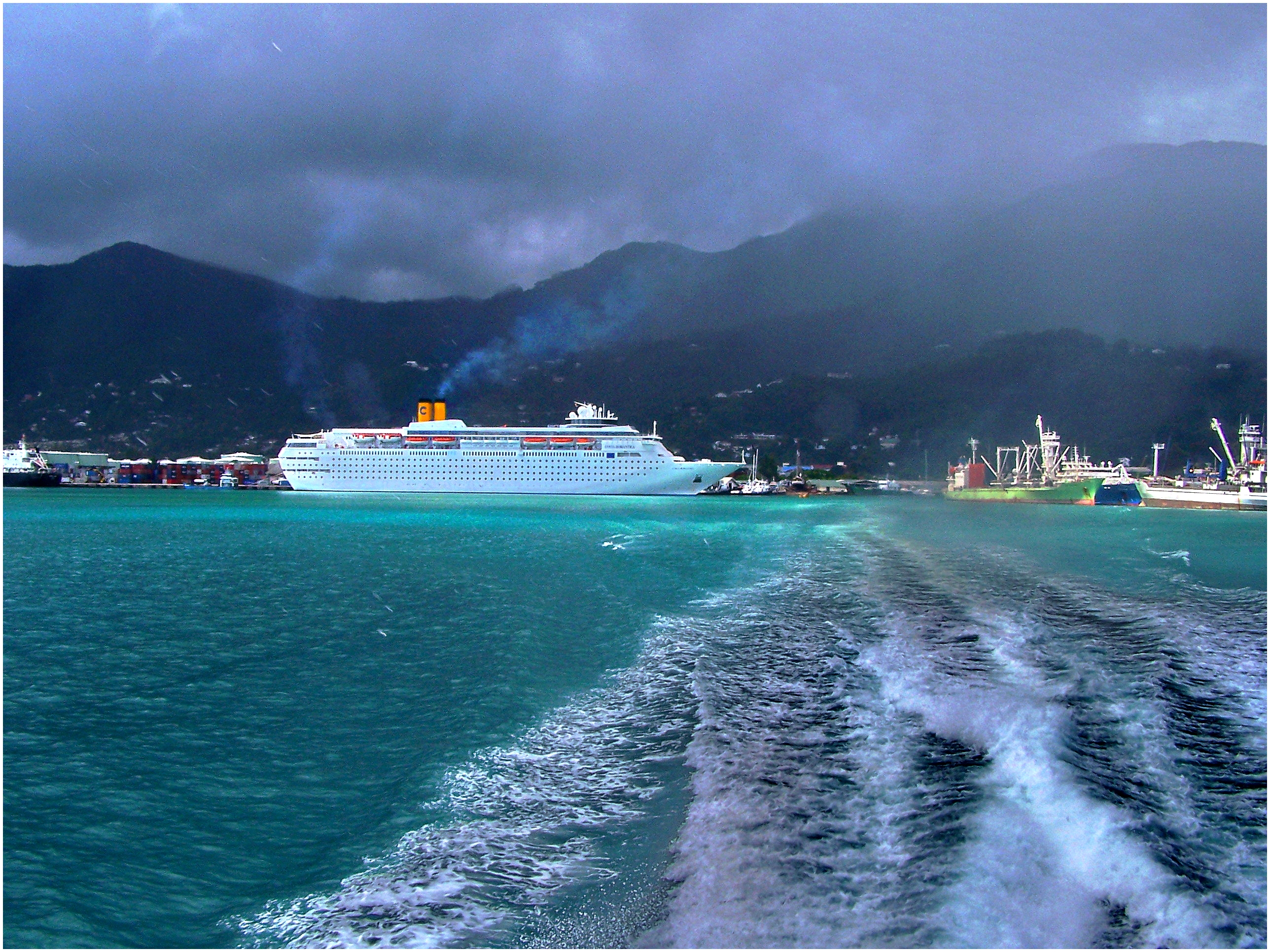
- Morne Seychellois (background), as seen from Port of Victoria.

Highest point
- Elevation: 905 m (2,969 ft)
- Prominence: 905 m (2,969 ft)
- Listing: Country high point
- Coordinates: 4°38′37.8″S 55°26′20.04″E

Geography
- Location within Seychelles
- Location: Seychelles

Morne Seychellois is the highest peak in Seychelles. Morne Seychellois is located on the island of Mahé in the Morne Seychellois National Park.

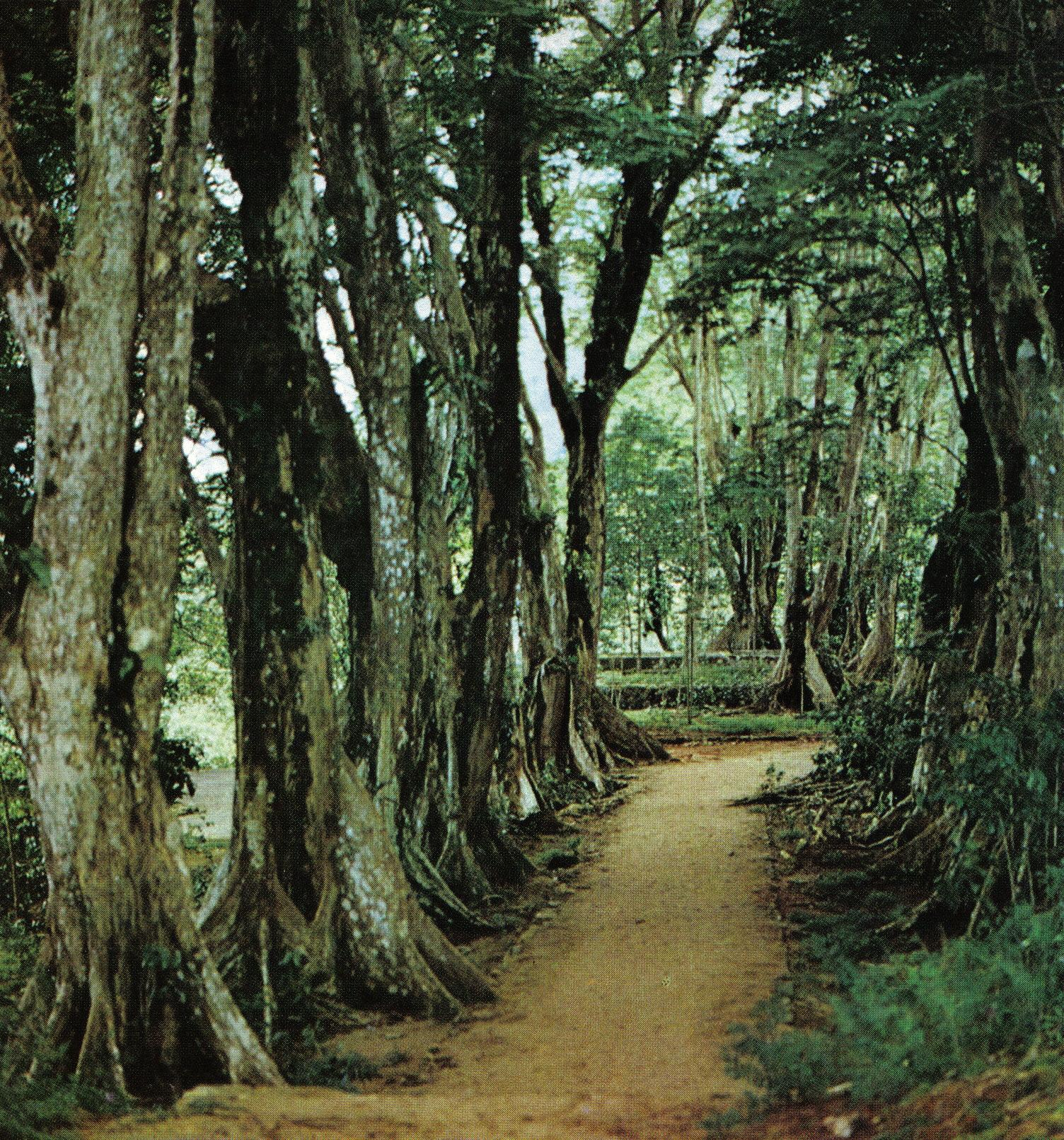
Rosewood trees along a footpath to the Mission Lodge in the Morne Seychellois National Park, Mahe, Seychelles
