= Top Gear: Botswana Special =

Episode of the British television show Top Gear

- Presented by: Jeremy Clarkson; Richard Hammond; James May; The Stig
- Country of origin: United Kingdom

Production
- Producer: Andy Wilman
- Running time: 60 minutes 66 minutes (director's cut)

Original release
- Network: BBC Two
- Release: 4 November 2007

Related
- Top Gear

Top Gear: Botswana Special is a full-length, special edition episode for BBC motoring programme Top Gear, and was first broadcast on BBC Two on 4 November 2007, as part of the fourth episode of Series 10. The special sees hosts, Jeremy Clarkson, Richard Hammond and James May, travelling across to Botswana with a car that each had bought in Africa for less than £1500, to prove that they can be better than SUVs for driving up "leafy country lanes". The Botswana Special was released as part of a 2-disc DVD boxset alongside the Top Gear: Vietnam Special on 23 March 2009. The special is best remembered for Richard Hammond developing a deep fondness for his chosen car, a 1963 Opel Kadett nicknamed "Oliver", which he brought back to the UK after filming concluded, and still owns.

== Summary ==
=== First leg: Zimbabwean border to Makgadikgadi ===
To see if people in Surrey can get up "leafy lanes" with something other than a 4x4 SUV, the producers challenge Clarkson, Hammond and May to drive across Botswana in the used cars bought within Africa. Each given £1,500, the presenters are told that their choice of car had to be two-wheel drive and not have been designed in any way for off-road use—May decides to sensibly purchase a 1985 Mercedes-Benz 230E due to it being a car that Africa favoured and loved, Clarkson chooses to buy a 1981 automatic Lancia Beta Coupé because of Lancia's history with rally racing, while Hammond goes for a 1963 Opel Kadett. Arriving at the starting point near to Botswana's border with Zimbabwe (which at the time, banned the BBC from filming within its borders), the trio learn that their cars would be taken on a journey of 1,000 miles (1,600 kilometres), to Botswana's northern border with Namibia. Setting off on their first leg, the trio reveals that each of their cars have some faults to them—Clarkson points out that the dials and several components were broken, May has a minor number of parts that weren't working, while Hammond notices his brakes only work on one wheel and there is a smell of petrol in his car. Hammond also develops a immediate fondness for the car, nicknaming it "Oliver", but fearing that Clarkson and May will make fun of him for doing so. As they move off tarmac and onto dirt roads, Hammond's car breaks down, whereupon the trio learns that if their car cannot be restarted after a breakdown, they will have to complete the rest of the journey in their least favourite car of all time—a Volkswagen Beetle. With Hammond's car fixed, they continue, and soon reach the camp site on the edge of the Makgadikgadi Pan.

=== Second leg: Makgadikgadi to Kalahari ===
Hammond's 1963 Opel Kadett "Oliver" (left), Clarkson's 1981 Lancia Beta Coupé (middle) and May's 1985 Mercedes-Benz 230E (right) on the Makgadikgadi Pan.

Upon arriving before the Makgadikgadi, the trio learn that the following day they will be travelling across it for two days, and are thus advised to strip and lighten their cars as much as possible to avoid them breaking through the thin top crust of the salt pans. That night, May and Clarkson remove seats, interior trim and panels, along with the windows and other components, until their cars are reduced to basic shells, while Hammond, having become so attached to his car, refuses to do so, instead removing only the spare tyre and an unspecified part. Prior to leaving, the trio receives an informal visit by Ian Khama, then-vice president of Botswana, who is impressed with the trio's plans to drive across the pans, but not so with their cars. Crossing the pans on the first of two days travel, the trio's progress is steady, until both Clarkson and May discover that their cars are digging into the Pan's surface, forcing them to call for assistance from the film crew and support team in getting them out and cleaning out their wheels of "prehistoric gunk", before stripping their cars of further components including the doors and the boot lid. Despite further issues with the surface, it eventually becomes firmer, allowing them to reach one of the Pan's islands and their next campsite. On the second day, the trio learns that they will encounter a dust storm, which presents a major issue for May and Clarkson, as exposed to it, they are forced to re-dress themselves to avoid choking; much to their annoyance, Hammond has no need to take such measures due to his car being unmodified. After overcoming the storms, Clarkson then finds his car breaking down twice and has to repair the Lancia en route. Eventually all three manage to reach the other side and make camp on the edge of the Kalahari Desert.

=== Third leg: Kalahari to Maun ===
Arriving at a small village in the Kalahari, the trio are told that their cars will face a time trial each on a specially made rally course out of a dried riverbed nearby, with each car to be driven by "The Stig's African cousin". Prior to heading for the course, the Lancia breaks down once again and has to be mended, before it joins the others. On the course, the Opel proves itself a good car and sets a time of 1:12, while May's Mercedes does better and achieves a time of 1:06. However, Clarkson's car fails to start after overheating, with the Stig's cousin walking off as a result. Whilst waiting for it to cool down, Clarkson discovers a new problem—both the Lancia and Hammond's Opel run on leaded fuel, and the reserve supply of it they were carrying has been used up. Because the cars of the film crew run on diesel fuel, the only option left for the trio is to cut a straight line through the Kalahari towards the town of Maun. During their off-roading, May's Mercedes becomes stuck in sand, forcing him use stones to give the tyres some traction. By the time night falls, the trio find themselves on the road to Maun, whereupon the Opel's alternator stops working and makes it impossible to use the headlights, forcing Hammond to bring one of the film crew aboard and use a lamp to illuminate the road ahead of him. Despite the issues, all three cars arrive at a petrol station in the town for refuelling before they turn in for the night.

=== Fourth leg: Okavango Delta ===
The following morning, when the presenters are sitting outside a restaurant in the center of Maun, they are told that their cars will now proceed towards the Okavango Delta, which they will be crossing for the next three days en route to the finish line at a border crossing with Namibia. To prepare for the journey, both Clarkson and May have to animal-proof their cars with various materials they could find, with a spare boot lid and rear door found for the Mercedes during the work before it is outfitted with corrugated metal doors, while Clarkson outfits his Lancia with a wooden gull-wing door, a loudspeaker and handset system, and seals the other door with used drink cans. Whilst modifying the cars, Clarkson and Hammond also put a cow bell on the underside of May's car, plant a cow's head in the boot, and stuff raw meat in various hiding places within the car; behind the scenes, the pair were told off by a local guide for endangering themselves, May, and the film crew from an animal attack by attempting this practical joke. With the cars modified, the trio makes for the Delta and immediately hit a sandy, dirt trail upon entering the Delta's game reserve, whereupon the Lancia suffers further problems when the throttle jams open and will not brake properly as a result. Despite this, the trio ends their day by taking a moment to observe a number of animals at a watering hole, before camping for the night with James servicing his Mercedes and a bush mechanic clearing out sand from one of the Lancia's carburettors.

The next day, after Hammond has to fix the Opel's steering after the underside of the car hit a tree root on the road, the group face a river crossing. While Hammond opts to find a crossing point further along the banks, his colleagues choose to wade across where they were; one idea the trio had for getting across, which was not shown in the TV broadcast, was to wrap the cars in some tarpaulin, inflated it with air, and then float them across the river, but this was abandoned after the group spent three and a half hours trying it. While Clarkson and May were successful in getting across despite nearly getting stuck and having their local guide shoot holes in the floors of their car to drain water from the interior, Hammond's attempt to ford the river at a proper crossing point leads to the Opel sinking into the water and stalling, requiring him to get it towed out. Due to the water damage, Hammond is forced to spend the second night fixing his car's engine and electrics with the aid of the bush mechanics from the support team, while the others drive ahead to make camp. In the morning, much to his colleagues' surprise, the Opel returns in working condition, with a further bonus being that the horn has been fixed. Heading off for the final push towards the road to the border crossing, the trio manages to make it across the Delta, but by now, new problems emerge—Hammond's Opel will not properly brake unless he de-clutches and uses the handbrake, while the Lancia is now veering off to the right.

=== Final leg: Okavango Delta to Namibian border ===
After finally making it out of the Delta, Clarkson and May remove their animal protection from their cars, at which point the Lancia suffers another problem—the starter solenoid has packed in and has to be repaired for the car to start up again. Although it is able to move off, it is now unable to drive in anything other than second gear. Eventually, the car suffers another breakdown along the road, resulting in much of the support team and film crew choosing to leave it behind after being so fed up with the constant problems it has caused. Clarkson stays behind with only two bush mechanics to fix several issues that have developed, including the engine stalling after it started up every time by going into third gear. Miraculously, the Lancia is able to move off again, and reaches the border with Namibia, behind Hammond and May. The Lancia is declared the worst car due to it being a constant source of problems. Despite Hammond's Opel needing only minor repairs, and May's Mercedes having almost no problems at all, Clarkson declares the backup Beetle as the surprise winner as it had no modifications or mishaps along the journey.

In homage to Archbishop Desmond Tutu, Nobel Peace Prize winner in 1984, the end credits replaced each crew member's first name with the words "Archbishop Desmond" (e.g. "Archbishop Desmond Clarkson, Archbishop Desmond Hammond, and Archbishop Desmond May...").

== Production ==
Filming of the episode included extensive planning of the route that was to be taken across the Makgadikgadi Pan; several weeks were spent trying to ensure that the cars being used did not go anywhere near conservation areas, with the Top Gear crew working with environmental experts on the planning. Throughout the journey, the team were followed by a support team of bush mechanics who provided assistance with the repairs of their cars, and were assisted in the Okavango Delta by professional guide, Clinton Edwards, with further logistical and filming support supplied by Letaka Safaris and AfriScreen Films, the latter having done extensive work with the BBC's Natural History Unit on various nature films and segments.

=== Post filming ===
Following the end of filming, Hammond decided that, as he loved his car so much, his Opel would be returning home with him, and began procedures for having it restored and shipped back to Britain. It arrived in time to be shown in the studio during the series' final episode. Oliver has since appeared during the HGV Challenge of Series 12, Hammond's CBBC show, Richard Hammond's Blast Lab, and on Hammond's Discovery+ series, Richard Hammond's Workshop. The Beetle was donated to one of the bush mechanics in the support team, and the Mercedes to an adviser who had helped during filming. The Lancia, originally believed to have been scrapped following filming, was discovered to still be in Maun, as of 2020, partially reassembled though missing its wheels and headlights. The following year, the Mercedes was also found to still be in Maun and appeared to have been mostly restored, although it had clearly not been moved for a long time.

Both the Lancia and the Mercedes reappear during the final 2024 episode of The Grand Tour, "One for the Road". In Maun, en-route to Kubu Island, Clarkson spots both cars on the side of the road. Both are identified as the originals; the Lancia because of "Lite Bite Cafe" written on the left side of the car and the Mercedes because of the five-speed knob on a four-speed gearbox. The Lancia has wheels but is still missing its headlights (one of them being in Clarkson's bag because he originally took it as a souvenir in 2007 and now brings it on every trip with him). The Mercedes is reassembled but both of the cars have clearly not been used for a long time.

== Criticism ==
The Environmental Investigation Agency criticised the BBC for allowing Top Gear to film in the Makgadikgadi pans following the broadcast of the special, claiming they had damaged the environmentally sensitive salt pans, adding that they had been shown "leaving scars across the Makgadikgadi salt pans by driving vehicles across them". In response to this, the BBC dismissed the claims by stating that the cars had not gone anywhere near to any conservation areas, and that they had followed the advice of environment experts, with the government of Botswana coming to the show's defence by stating that the Top Gear producers had spent considerable time ensuring that no damage was done to the wilderness by spending many weeks planning a suitable route.

== DVD release ==
On 23 March 2009, the BBC released a two-disc box set entitled Top Gear - The Great Adventures 2, containing extended versions of both the Botswana Special and the Vietnam Special. The director's cut of this special included deleted scenes and commentary by the show's executive producer, Andy Wilman.
