= Ralph Etienne-Cummings =

American engineer

- Education: University of Pennsylvania (Ph.D., M.S.); Lincoln University (B.S.)
- Scientific career
- Fields: Neuromorphic engineering Computer vision Robotics
- Workplaces: Johns Hopkins University

Ralph Etienne-Cummings is an academic in the field of electrical engineering. He is the Julian S. Smith Professor of Electrical & Computer Engineering at Johns Hopkins University.

== Early life and education ==
Etienne-Cummings was born on August 20, 1967, in Mahe, Seychelles. At age 12 he entered boarding school in the United Kingdom, then moved to the United States with his family during high school.

Etienne-Cummings graduated from Lincoln University in 1988 with a B.S. degree in physics. He went on to receive his M.S. and Ph.D. degrees in electrical engineering from the University of Pennsylvania in 1991 and 1994, respectively. His thesis was on biologically motivated analog VSLI systems for optomotor tasks.

== Career and research ==
After receiving his doctoral degree Etienne-Cummings taught as an assistant professor at Southern Illinois University before moving to Johns Hopkins University in 1998. In 2002 he began teaching at the University of Maryland while founding and directing the Institute of Neuromorphic Engineering. He returned to Johns Hopkins and in 2004 was appointed Associate Director for Education and Outreach of the Engineering Research Center on Computer Integrated Surgical Systems and Technology. In 2006 he was named a visiting African Fellow and Fulbright Fellowship Grantee for his sabbatical at the University of Cape Town in South Africa. In 2008, he became a full professor of electrical and computer engineering at Johns Hopkins University. From 2014-2022, he served as the chair of the electrical and computer engineering department at Johns Hopkins University. In March 2022, he was appointed vice provost for faculty affairs at Johns Hopkins University.

He has served on numerous boards and committees, including his appointment as chairman of the IEEE Circuits and Systems (CAS) Technical Committee on Sensory Systems and on Neural Systems and Application, and has served as a consulting engineer for several technology firms including Nova Sensors and Panasonic. In 2012 he was recognized by the National Science Foundation as a HistoryMaker for his contributions to electrical engineering. In 2021, he was elected to the American Institute for Medical and Biological Engineering's College of Fellows (AIMBE).

Etienne-Cummings currently directs the Computational Sensory-Motor Systems Laboratory at Johns Hopkins University. His research spans a range of electrical and computer engineering topics, including mixed-signal VSLI systems, computational sensors, computer vision, neuromorphic engineering, smart structures, mobile robotics, legged locomotion and neuroprosthetic devices. He has published over 220 peer-reviewed articles, 11 book chapters and holds 10 patents and applications on his work.

== Selected publications ==
- Etienne-Cummings, Ralph, et al. "A foveated silicon retina for two-dimensional tracking." IEEE Transactions on Circuits and Systems II: Analog and Digital Signal Processing 47.6 (2000): 504-517.
- Lewis, M. Anthony, Francesco Tenore, and Ralph Etienne-Cummings. "CPG design using inhibitory networks." Proceedings of the 2005 IEEE international conference on robotics and automation. IEEE, 2005.
- Yadid-Pecht, Orly, and Ralph Etienne-Cummings, eds. CMOS imagers: from phototransduction to image processing. Springer Science & Business Media, 2007.
- Thakur, Chetan Singh, et al. "Large-scale neuromorphic spiking array processors: A quest to mimic the brain." Frontiers in neuroscience 12 (2018): 891.

== Awards and honors ==
- National Science Foundation CAREER and Office of Naval Research Young Investigator Program Award
- National Science Foundation HistoryMaker
- Fulbright Fellowship Grantee
- Science Spectrum Magazine Trailblazer Award
- National Academies of Science Kavli Frontiers Fellow
- 2012 Most Outstanding Paper of the IEEE Transaction on Neural Systems and Rehabilitation Engineering
