= Nabuyongo Island =

Island in Mulemba, Kagera, Tanzania

- Location within Tanzania

Geography
- Location: Lake Victoria
- Coordinates: 01°28′11″S 32°36′43″E
- Length: 12.7 km (7.89 mi)
- Width: 11.8 km (7.33 mi)

Administration
- Tanzania
- Region: Kagera Region
- District: Muleba District

Demographics
- Demonym: Goziban
- Languages: Kara & Swahili
- Ethnic groups: Haya people

Nabuyongo Island (Kisiwa cha Nabuyongo, in Swahili), also known as Goziba, is a freshwater island located in Lake Victoria. The island is administratively part of Muleba District in Kagera Region, Tanzania. The island is located in the middle of the lake with hundreds of fishermen stationed there and is also an area of meteorological interest.

During the First World War it was the site of World War I naval action between British and German lake steamers. Data from small Nabuyonge Island, in the middle of the lake, indicates that the island receives an average of more than 3000 mm of precipitation annually, making it one of the wettest in Africa. Compared to comparable coastal or island stations in the lake, this value is about 30% higher.
