= Farqua =

Scientific classification
- Kingdom: Animalia
- Phylum: Arthropoda
- Subphylum: Chelicerata
- Class: Arachnida
- Order: Araneae
- Infraorder: Araneomorphae
- Family: Oonopidae
- Genus: Farqua
- Species: F. quadrimaculata

Binomial name
- Farqua quadrimaculata Saaristo, 2001

Genus of spiders

Farqua is a genus of spiders belonging to the family Oonopidae. It was first described in 2001 by Saaristo. As of 2017, the genus includes only one species, Farqua quadrimaculata, which is found on the Farquhar Group islands in the Seychelles.
