= Kubu Island =

Dry granite rock island in the Makgadikgadi Pan of Botswana

Coordinates: 20.893°S 25.819°E

Native name: Ga'nnyo
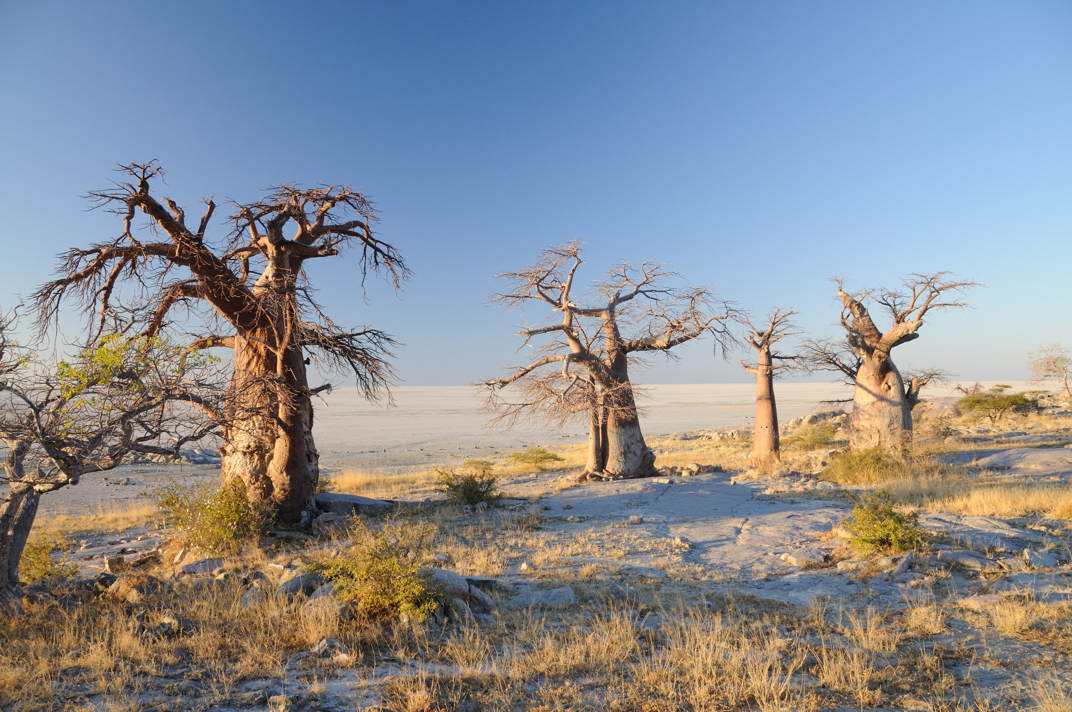
- Kubu Island
- Interactive map of Kubu Island

Geography
- Location: Makgadikgadi Pan area of Botswana

Kubu Island (Ga'nnyo) is a dry granite rock island located in the Makgadikgadi Pan area of Botswana. The island is located a few kilometers away from Orapa and Letlhakane mining towns and can be accessed through Mmatshumo in the Boteti district. The entire island is a national monument, and is considered a sacred site by the indigenous people of the area.

It is accessible by four wheel drive vehicles and has basic camping facilities. The campsite is run for the benefit of the local population.

The British television programme Top Gear travelled through the area in their 2007 Botswana Special, with presenter Jeremy Clarkson describing the island as "just about the most astonishing place I've ever been". It was significant enough to be chosen as the location to end the 2024 final episode of the presenters' successor show The Grand Tour.

== Natural history ==
The Makgadikgadi Pan is a large salt pan in northern Botswana, the largest salt flat complex in the world. These salt pans cover approximately 16,000 km^{2} and form the bed of the ancient Lake Makgadikgadi that began evaporating millennia ago.

== Archaeological heritage ==
The name Kubu means either "large rock" in the Kalanga language or hippopotamus in Tswana. Local Khoe people call the site Ga'nnyo. Archaeological recovery in the Makgadikgadi has revealed the presence of prehistoric humans through abundant finds of stone tools; some of these tools have been dated sufficiently early to establish their origin as earlier than the era of Homo sapiens. Kubu Island also contains dry stone wall, which is up to 1.25 m high, and 344 circular stone cairns.
