= Sabaloka Game Reserve =

- IUCN category IV (habitat/species management area)

The Sabaloka Game Reserve is 77 kilometres (48 mi) north of Khartoum, the capital of Sudan, on the Nile river, at the Sixth Cataract, 15 kilometres (9.3 mi) north of Wad Ramli. It was established in 1946. This site is 1160 km^{2}.

Due to the change of climatic conditions, excessive deforestation and hunting of wild animals, the living conditions in this area have changed greatly. The disappearance of vegetation is visible, many animals have disappeared, and many are threatened with extinction.

Archaeological excavations were carried out in this area in the period from 2013 to 2015. This significantly improved the archaeological map of Sudan and provided an understanding of the development of prehistoric communities in the Sabaloka Game Reserve area.
