= Lekhubu Island =

Rock outcrop in Botswana

Geography
- Location: Sua Pan, Botswana

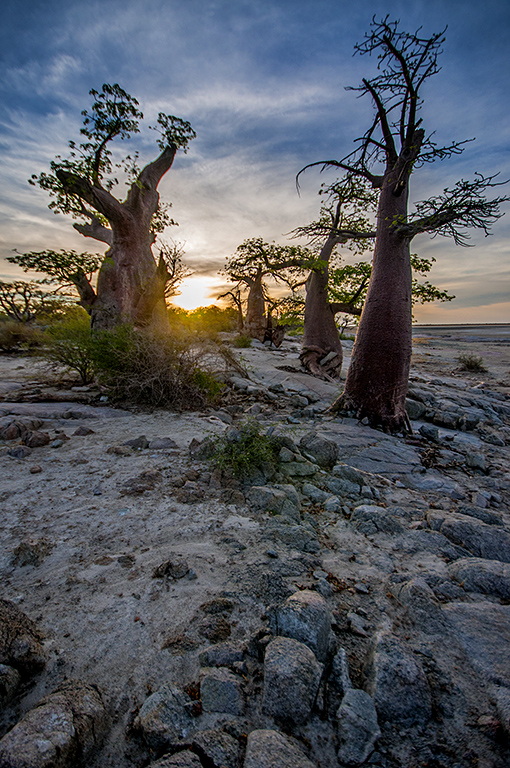
Lekhubu Island

Lekhubu Island is a rock outcrop in Botswana. It is located in the Southern campus of the large natural topographic depression within the Makgadikgadi region of Botswana called the Sua Pan, which is the largest pan in Botswana. It is a two billion year old granite rock island, crescent shaped and is about one kilometre long, its slopes are littered with fossil beaches of rounded pebbles, an indication of the prehistoric lake's former water levels. Lukhubu is referred to as an island because it is surrounded by a sea of white salt.

== History ==
Lekhubu is a rock outcrop which was covered with water of the tremendous Lake Makgadikgadi, which is one of the largest lakes in Africa. Lekhubu means the rock outcrop. Kubu is a Setswana name that refers to the hippopotamus.

About 10,000 years ago, the Lake Makgadikgadi dried up and only Lekhubu Island remained with a lot of salt in it. All this was caused by the climatic changes that took place many years ago. Initiation used to take place there and people were marked musing the stones called the cairns that made sure that people got initiated.

== Location ==
Lekhubu is located in the Southern campus of the large natural topographic depression within the Makgadikgadi region of Botswana called the Sua pan, which is the largest pan in Botswana. Lekhubu site is off the track in between the Gweta village, Nata and Letlhakane, therefore people who visit the site are encouraged to be in touch with the villagers to get more information on how to get there or visit the Mmatshumo village and the veterinary gates. Mmatshumo is just 42 km away from Lekhubu and roughly 100 km away from Gweta village.
