= Conception Island, Seychelles =

Island in the Seychelles

Conception Island
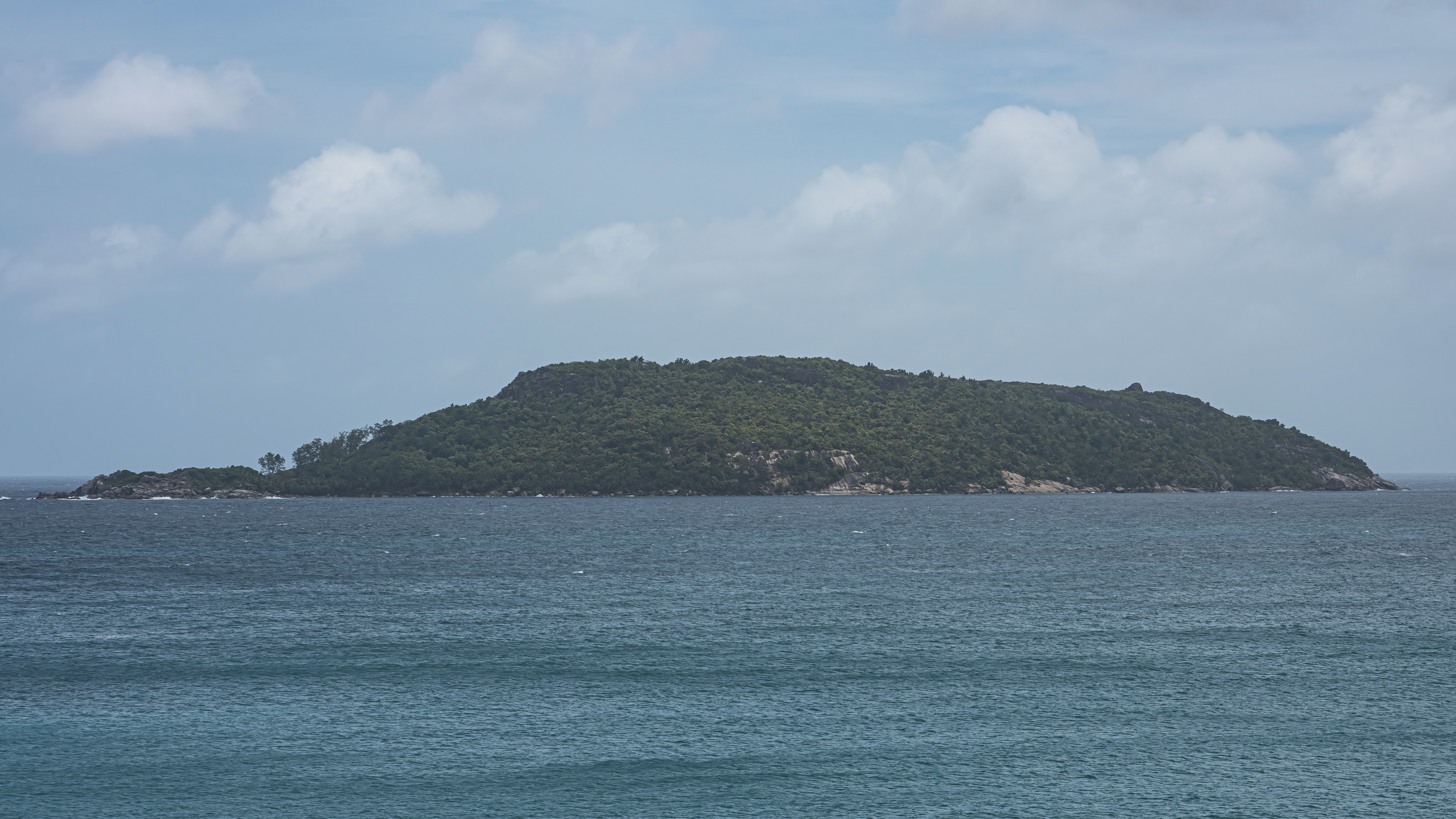

- Location within Seychelles

Geography
- Location: Seychelles, Indian Ocean
- Coordinates: 4°40′S 55°22′E
- Archipelago: Inner Islands, Seychelles
- Adjacent to: Indian Ocean
- Total islands: 1
- Major islands: Conception
- Area: 0.604 km^{2} (0.233 sq mi)
- Length: 1.5 km (0.93 mi)
- Width: 0.6 km (0.37 mi)
- Coastline: 3.5 km (2.17 mi)
- Highest elevation: 131 m (430 ft)
- Highest point: Conception

Administration
- Seychelles
- Group: Granitic Seychelles
- Sub-Group: Mahe Islands
- Sub-Group: Port Glaud Islands
- Districts: Port Glaud

Demographics
- Population: 0 (2014)
- Pop. density: 0/km^{2} (0/sq mi)
- Ethnic groups: Creole, French, East Africans, Indians.

Additional information
- Time zone: SCT (UTC+4)
- ISO code: SC-21
- Official website: www.seychelles.travel/en/discover/the-islands/

Conception Island is a small island (0.603 km^{2}) in the Seychelles 2 km west of Mahé. Conception contained a coconut plantation until the mid-1970s; today it is uninhabited. Conception Island, along with its sister island Thérèse Island, is part of Port Glaud district of Mahé, the main island of the Seychelles.

Recently the island has been created as a wildlife reserve. It is the home of the extremely rare Seychelles white-eye and other birds such as the Seychelles kestrel, Seychelles blue pigeon and the Malagasy turtle-dove. It also has two species of gecko.

== Image gallery ==
Map 1

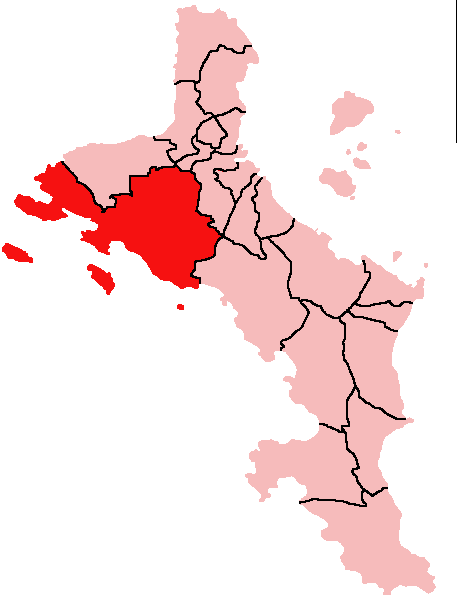
District Map

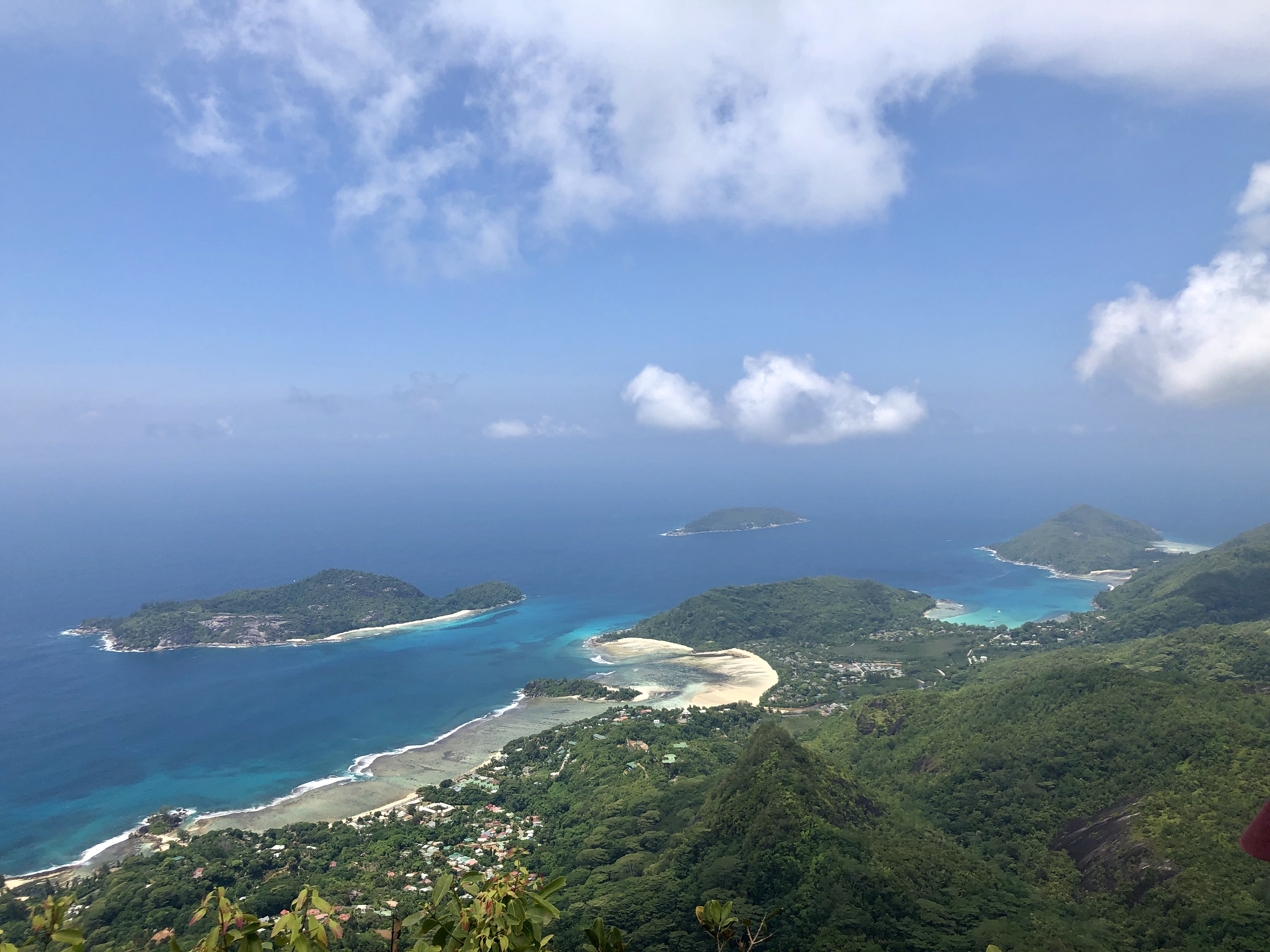
View from Morne Blanc facing West, Conception Island is in the center
