= Zave =

Coordinates: 17°23′S 30°03′E

Zave is a village in the province of Mashonaland West, Zimbabwe. It is located about 7 km north of Lion's Den and is the terminus of a railway branch line. It lies west of the Harare-Chirundu highway, and serves as an agricultural hub for the area. The area sits at an elevation of roughly 1,166 metres above sea level and experiences temperatures frequently ranging between 18ºC and 29ºC depending on the season.
