= Madinari Island =

Madinari Island is a remote island in the central Okavango Delta, Botswana. Madinari, meaning "Mother of Buffalo", is one of the stops during National Geographic explorer Steve Boyes' continued mokoro expeditions across the Okavango Delta.
