= Mukawwar Managed Nature Reserve =

Nature reserve in Sudan

- IUCN category IV (habitat/species management area)
- Location within Sudan
- Nearest city: Port Sudan
- Coordinates: 20°48′00″N 37°15′49″E

The Mukawwar Managed Nature Reserve is found in Sudan. This 300 km² marine reserve surrounds Mukawwar Island off the Red Sea coast of Sudan.

The reserve is protected area.
