= Thérèse Island =

Island off the coast of Mahé, Seychelles

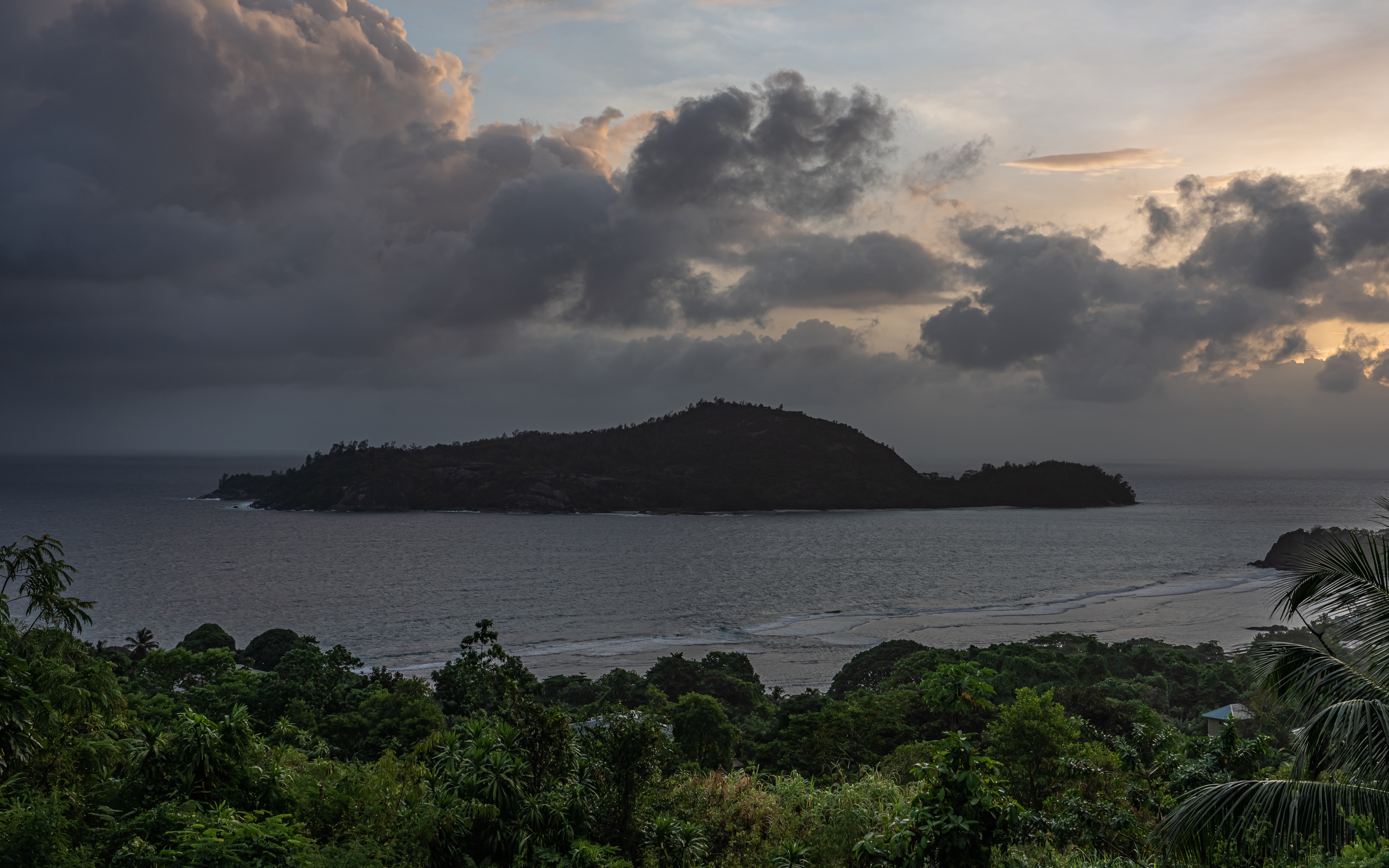

- Location within Seychelles

Geography
- Location: Seychelles, Indian Ocean
- Coordinates: 4°40′S 55°24′E
- Archipelago: Inner Islands, Seychelles
- Adjacent to: Indian Ocean
- Total islands: 1
- Major islands: Thérèse
- Area: 0.762 km^{2} (0.294 sq mi)
- Length: 1.6 km (0.99 mi)
- Width: 0.7 km (0.43 mi)
- Coastline: 4.5 km (2.8 mi)
- Highest elevation: 164 m (538 ft)
- Highest point: Thérèse

Administration
- Seychelles
- Group: Granitic Seychelles
- Sub-Group: Mahe Islands
- Sub-Group: Port Glaud Islands
- Districts: Port Glaud
- Largest settlement: Thérèse

Demographics
- Population: 0 (2014)
- Pop. density: 0/km^{2} (0/sq mi)
- Ethnic groups: Creole, French, East Africans, Indians.

Additional information
- Time zone: SCT (UTC+4)
- ISO code: SC-21
- Official website: www.seychelles.travel/en/discover/the-islands/

Thérèse Island is a small island off the western coast of Mahé in the Seychelles. It has 700 m long white sand beaches, with numerous coconut palms. It has two rocky peaks which resemble a giant's staircase, the tallest, Thérèse Peak, being 164 metres (538 feet) above sea level. There is a reef protecting the south shore of the island. Thérèse Island, along with its sister island Conception Island, is part of Port Glaud district of Mahé, the main island of the Seychelles.

The island is uninhabited but tourists frequently visit it for its water-sports including scuba diving, snorkeling, water skiing, sailing, windsurfing, and deep sea fishing.

== Administration ==
The island belongs to Port Glaud District. The island is for sale

== Tourism ==
Today, the island's main industry is tourism.

== Image gallery ==
Map 1

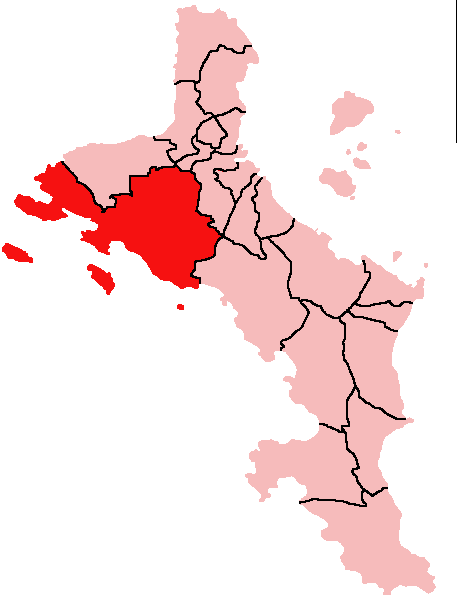
District Map

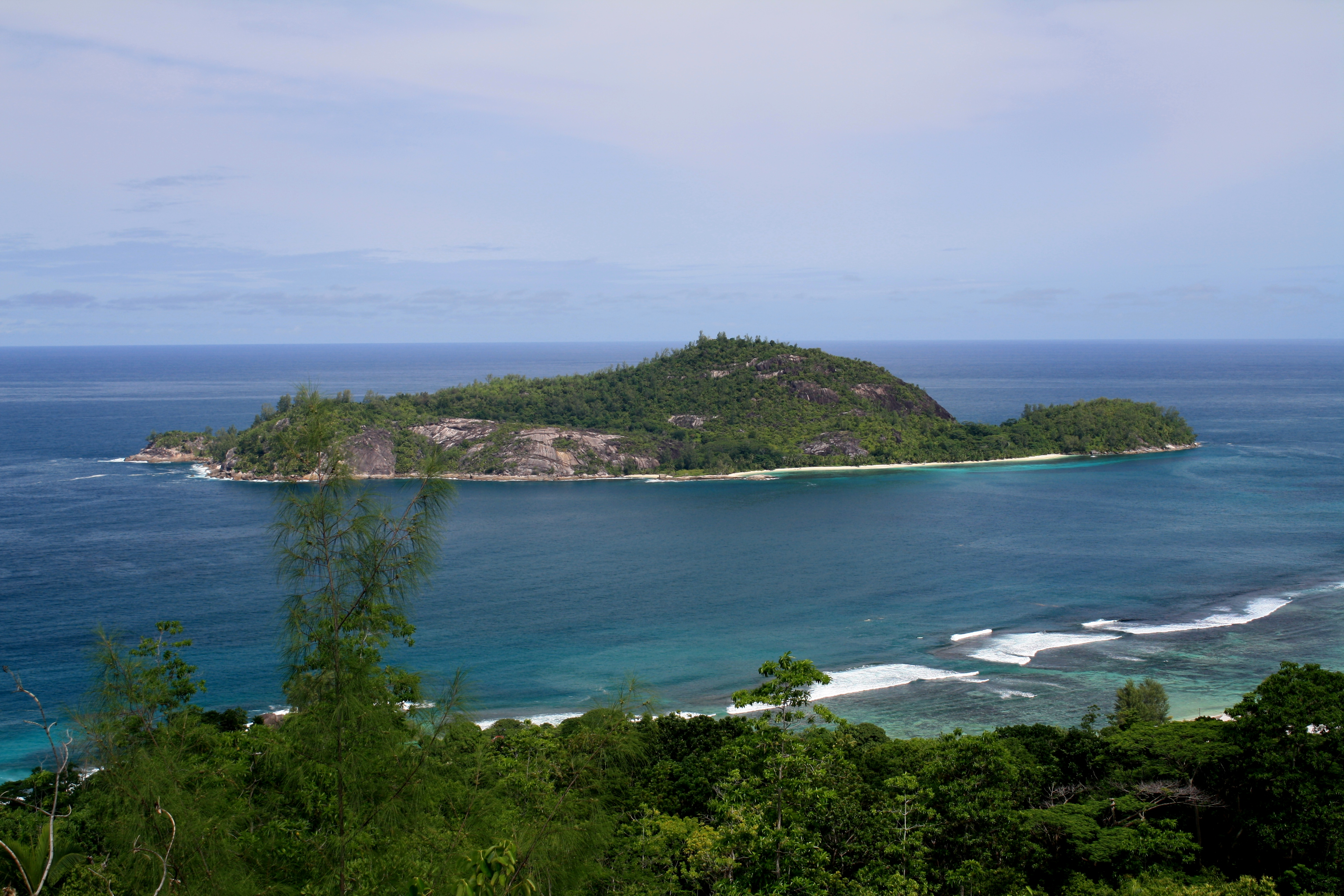
Thérèse Island
