= Providence Atoll =

Atoll in the Seychelles

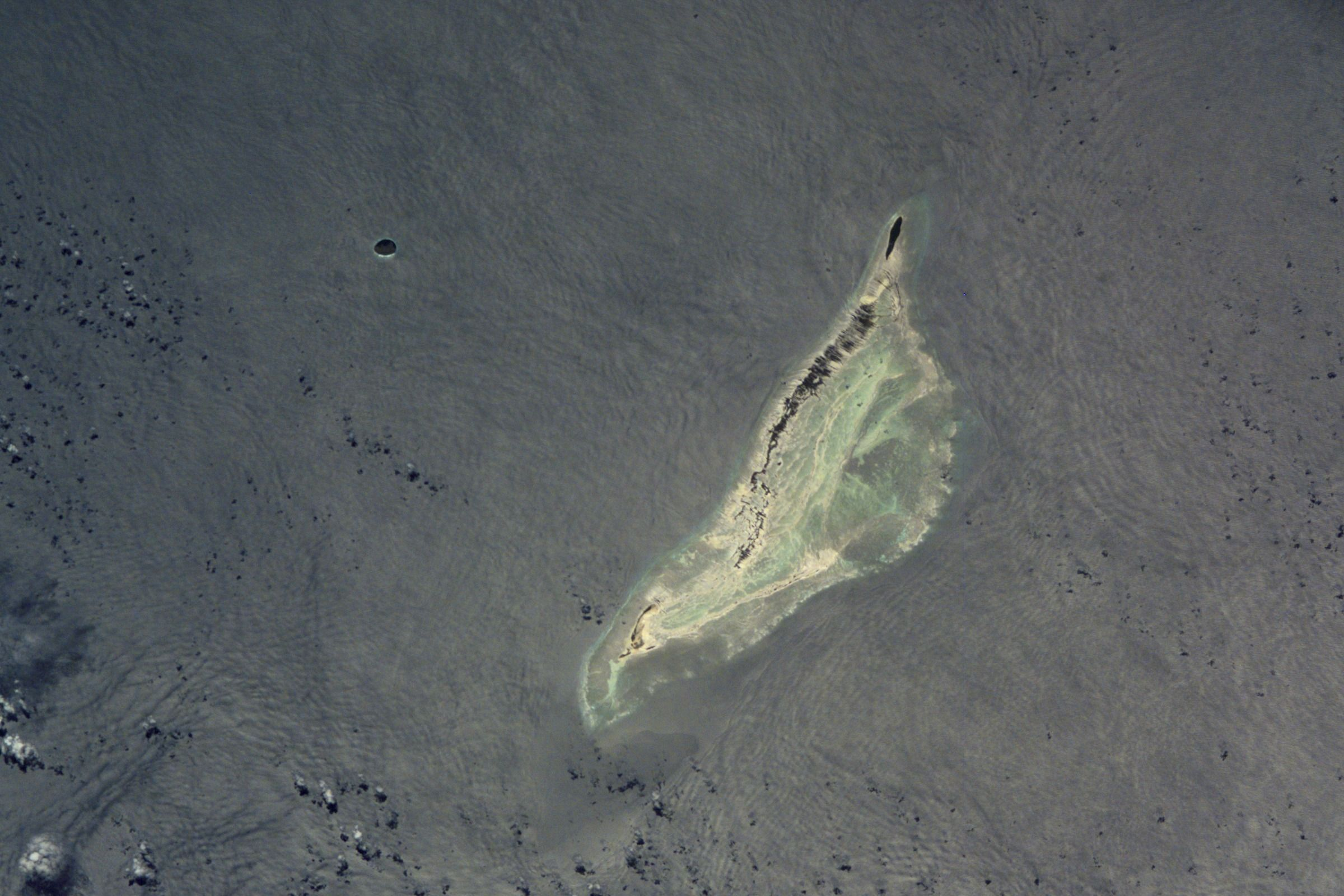
- Providence Atoll in an image from space on 15 April 2001. Providence Island runs very close to north-south, which the image does not reflect.

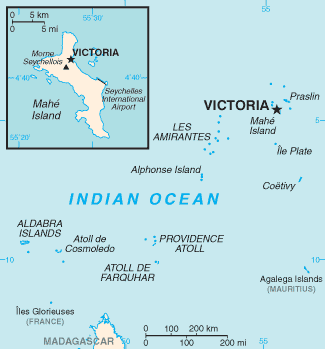
- Map of Seychelles, Providence Atoll in the lower center

- Location within Seychelles

Geography
- Location: Indian Ocean
- Coordinates: 09°18′S 51°00′E
- Archipelago: Seychelles
- Adjacent to: Indian Ocean
- Total islands: 2
- Major islands: Providence Island; Cerf Island
- Area: 2.82 km^{2} (1.09 sq mi)
- Highest elevation: 0 m (0 ft)

Administration
- Seychelles
- Group: Outer Islands
- Sub-Group: Farquhar Group
- Sub-Group: Providence Islands
- Districts: Outer Islands District
- Largest settlement: Providence (pop. 0)

Demographics
- Population: 0 (2014)
- Pop. density: 0/km^{2} (0/sq mi)

Additional information
- Time zone: SCT (UTC+4)
- ISO code: SC-26
- Official website: www.seychelles.travel/en/discover/the-islands/outer-islands

Providence Atoll is an uninhabited atoll in the Seychelles. It is part of the Outer Islands, lying 710 km (383 nmi; 441 mi) southwest of the capital city, Victoria. The atoll consists of Providence Island in the north, Bancs Providence in the south, and an intervening fringing reef. It is administered as part of the Outer Islands District of the Seychelles.

== History ==
Bancs Providence is also known as Cerf Island, after Le Cerf, which was one of the ships commanded by Captain Nicolas Morphey, who sighted the island (or islands) on 30 July 1756. Bancs Providence has never been permanently inhabited, though temporary huts of fishermen have been recorded as early as 1882.

The French frigate L’Heureuse was wrecked on the atoll's reefs in 1763. The crew named the atoll Providence, because it was their salvation. They were able to survive on the atoll until they were rescued.

In 1846, Charles Pridham wrote that Providence had "been granted to an inhabitant of Mauritius who has established a fishery and planted cocoa-nut trees and makes a large profit from the sale of tortoiseshell etc. He employs about forty persons. Lepers are no longer sent here….These islands will bear a few years’ cultivation, but beyond the cocoa-nut tree little will remain of further promise. Those, however, who are shipwrecked on these isles, will find water and sufficient means of existence till chance or their own resources may relieve them".

Providence Island once had a small settlement in the middle of the island, at 9°13′50″S 51°01′54″E. It was inhabited by workers engaged in fishing and copra production, probably continuously from at least 1846 until late 2006, when six villagers inhabited the settlement. In late 2006, Cyclone Bondo destroyed most of the buildings and about 60 per cent of the coconut trees. Following the cyclone, the island was evacuated on 26 December 2006.

== Geography ==
Providence Atoll has a length of 44 km (24 nmi; 27 mi) on its north-south axis, and a width of about 12 km (6 nmi; 7 mi). The total area covered by the atoll is approximately 345 km^{2} (101 sq nmi; 133 sq mi). The aggregate land area, however, is only 2.82 km^{2} (1.1 sq mi). West of the atoll, the sea bottom plunges steeply to a depth of 180 metres (591 ft) only 2.5 kilometres (1.3 nmi; 1.6 mi) beyond the fringing reef. The islands of the atoll are small, coraline, and inhospitable.

Providence Island is located in the far north of the atoll at 9°13′S 51°02′E. It is 3.6 km (2 mi) long north-to-south, and up to 650 m (710 yd) wide at its widest part. It has the shape of a kite. The land area is 1.72 square kilometres (0.66 sq mi), with a coastline of 7.8 km (5 mi).

Bancs Providence is located in the far south of the atoll 30 km (16 nmi; 19 mi) south of Providence Island, at 09°31′59″S 50°59′10″E. The land area is 1.1 km^{2} (0.4 sq mi), with a coastline of 17 km (11 mi). Bancs Providence comprises four large and about six very small islands, but its size and shape appear to be dynamic. In 1967, it was said to be a single large cay with four smaller ones, in 1905 there were seven small islands and in 1882 it comprised three small islets.

The closest neighbor of Providence Atoll is St. Pierre Island, 35 km (19 nmi; 22 mi) west of Cerf Island.

== Flora and fauna ==
Providence Atoll occupies an extensive bank of shallow water well known for its profusion of fish. Green turtles and hawksbill turtle nest on Providence and forage in adjacent waters.

The huge area of reef flats attracts the largest population of grey heron in the Seychelles. Crab plover, whimbrel and other waders roost at the southern tip of Providence, Pointe Gustave. Black-naped tern and greater crested tern breed on Bancs Providence, discovered only in 2016 by ICS. There are also small numbers of fairy terns. The Madagascar fody, probably introduced, is the only resident land bird.

There are no mammals on the atoll.

== Transport ==
Following the evacuation of Providence Island on 26 December 2006, an attempt was made to construct an airstrip on the island to serve the inhabitants in anticipation of their eventual return. Construction was abandoned, however, and the island has remained uninhabited. Airstrip construction later resumed, and an airstrip became operational on the island in 2020. The airstrip enables additional support for the surveillance of the area by the Seychelles People's Defence Force.

Providence Island has no jetty. The island is rarely visited by ships except by the occasional Island Conservation Society expedition or by an Islands Development Company (IDC) boat from Mahé.

There are many shipwrecks at Providence Atoll, including records of a Maldivian mariner presence at the atoll from the 20th century, when a trading vessel from southern Maldives reached Providence Atoll after drifting in the ocean for weeks.

== Economics ==
Fishing and copra production took place on Providence Island probably continuously from at least 1846 until late 2006, when Cyclone Bondo struck. Economic activity came to a halt when the island was evacuated on 26 December 2006, and it has remained uninhabited since then.

An airstrip was constructed in 2022 and it is planned to open a small resort focused on fly-fishing and ecotourism in 2024.

Providence Atoll is a famous fly-fishing destination

== Image gallery ==
Location of Providence Atoll in Seychelles.
