= Mahé =

Largest island of Seychelles

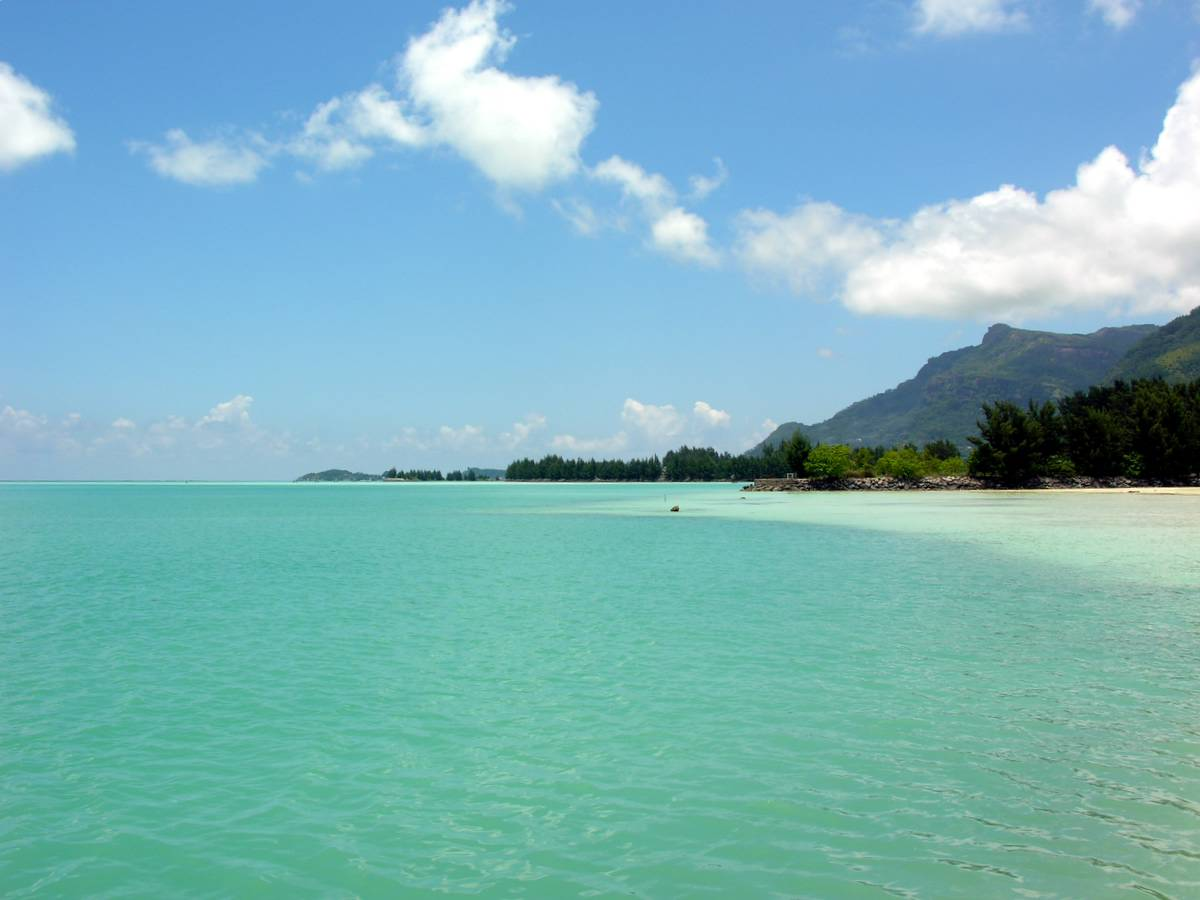
- Beach on Mahé

- Location within Seychelles

Geography
- Location: Seychelles, Indian Ocean
- Coordinates: 4.68°S 55.48°E
- Archipelago: Inner Islands, Seychelles
- Adjacent to: Indian Ocean
- Total islands: 1
- Major islands: Mahé
- Area: 157.3 km^{2} (60.7 sq mi)
- Length: 26 km (16.2 mi)
- Width: 17 km (10.6 mi)
- Coastline: 111.3 km (69.16 mi)
- Highest elevation: 905 m (2969 ft)
- Highest point: Morne Seychellois

Administration
- Seychelles
- Group: Inner Islands
- Sub-Group: Mahe Islands
- Districts: Multiple
- Largest settlement: Victoria (pop. 35,000)

Demographics
- Population: 95,000 (2018)
- Pop. density: 490/km^{2} (1270/sq mi)
- Ethnic groups: Chinese, Creole, East Africans, French, and Indians

Additional information
- Time zone: SCT (UTC+4)

Mahé is the largest island of Seychelles, with an area of 157.3 square kilometres (60.7 sq mi), lying in the northeast of the Seychellois nation in the Somali Sea part of the Indian Ocean. The population of Mahé was 77,000, as of the 2010 census. It contains the capital city of Victoria and accommodates 86% of the country's total population. The island was named after Bertrand-François Mahé de La Bourdonnais, a French governor of Isle de France (modern-day Mauritius).

== History ==
Mahé was first visited by the British in 1609 and not visited by Europeans again until Lazare Picault's expedition of 1742. The French navy frégate Le Cerf (English: The Deer) arrived at Port Victoria on 1 November 1756. On board was Corneille Nicholas Morphey, leader of the French expedition, which claimed the island for the King of France by laying a Stone of Possession on Mahé, Seychelles' oldest monument, now on display in the National Museum, Victoria.

In August 1801, Royal Navy frigate HMS Sibylle captured the French frigate Chiffonne on the island. Mahé remained a French possession until 1812 when it became a British colony. It remained a colony until 1976 when Seychelles became an independent nation.

Mahé had a huge land reclamation project due to a housing shortage in the areas of Bel Ombre and the Port of Victoria.

== Geography ==
Mahé's tallest peak is Morne Seychellois at 905 m (2,969 ft), which lies in the Morne Seychellois National Park. The northern and eastern parts of the island are home to much of the population and the Seychelles International Airport, which opened in 1971. The southern and western parts have Baie Ternay Marine National Park, Port Launay Marine National Park, and University of Seychelles. The Sainte Anne Marine National Park lies offshore, as do Conception Island, Thérèse Island, Anonyme Island, and several smaller islands.

Mahé's forests have rare endemic plants found only in Seychelles, such as the critically endangered Medusagyne oppositifolia (the jellyfish tree), the carnivorous Nepenthes pervillei (Seychelles pitcher plant), and many unique species of orchid.

== Economy ==
Mahé's economy is mainly dependent on tourism.

Air Seychelles has its head office on the property of Seychelles International Airport on the island. The Port of Victoria is home to a tuna fishing and canning industry. From 1963 to 1996, the United States Air Force maintained a satellite control network at the Indian Ocean Station, where it had a significant impact on the local economy.

== Notable people ==
- Margaret Elwyn Sparshott (1870–1940), English matron, born in Mahé.
- Gaston Labat (1876–1934), an influential physician, leader and advocate of regional anesthesiology, and the original founder of the American Society of Regional Anesthesia in 1923.
- Wavel Ramkalawan (1961), fifth president of the Seychelles.
- Ralph Etienne-Cummings (born 1967), Julian S. Smith Professor of Electrical and Computer Engineering at Johns Hopkins University
