= Port Island, Seychelles =

Artificial island in Seychelles

Port Island
Ile du Port
- Location within Seychelles

Geography
- Location: Seychelles, Indian Ocean
- Coordinates: 4.614°S 55.461°E
- Archipelago: Inner Islands, Seychelles
- Adjacent to: Indian Ocean
- Area: 0.587 km^{2} (0.227 sq mi)
- Length: 1.2 km (0.75 mi)
- Width: 0.7 km (0.43 mi)
- Coastline: 3.5 km (2.17 mi)
- Highest elevation: 0 m (0 ft)

Administration
- Seychelles
- Group: Granitic Seychelles
- Sub-Group: Mahe Islands
- Sub-Group: Mahe Port Islands
- Districts: English River
- Largest settlement: North Point (pop. 10)

Demographics
- Population: 10 (2014)
- Pop. density: 17/km^{2} (44/sq mi)
- Ethnic groups: Creole, French, East Africans, Indians.

Additional information
- Time zone: SCT (UTC+4)
- ISO code: SC-16
- Official website: www.puc.sc

Port Island (French: Ile du Port) is an artificial island in Seychelles, lying 2 km from the capital Victoria.

== History ==
The island was constructed between 1995 and 2002. It belongs to the Mahe Port Islands, which are mostly artificial islands created by funds from Dubai when the Dubai dredger was placed in Seychelles. The works began in 1998 in 2009 the new Seychelles National Assembly building was inaugurated. In 2012 the island was ready for installment of wind turbines. In 2013 the island was visited by UN inspectors inspecting worldwide scale of wind farms. In the end of 2013 the wind farm was launched in 2014, it was reported that the PUC farm on Port Island was a success.

== Geography ==
The artificial island plan is a Mixed Commercial, Governmental, Financial, Port & Fisheries.

== Facilities ==
Seychelles National Assembly (2009)

The Port Island causeway connects Port Island to Perseverance Island and to mainland Mahe.

- Seychelles National Assembly
- Judiciary
- Stock Exchange Building
- University of Port Island
- Park
- Petrol Station
- SPTC Headquarters
- SIBA Headquarters
- Fish canning Factory
- Storage Facilities
- New Port section
- PUC farm
- Hotel - new govt. Hotel
- Heliport
- IKEA store

== Demographics ==
The construction camp is located near the Seychelles National Assembly building on the north point.

== Administration ==
The island belongs to English River District.

== Image gallery ==
Map 1

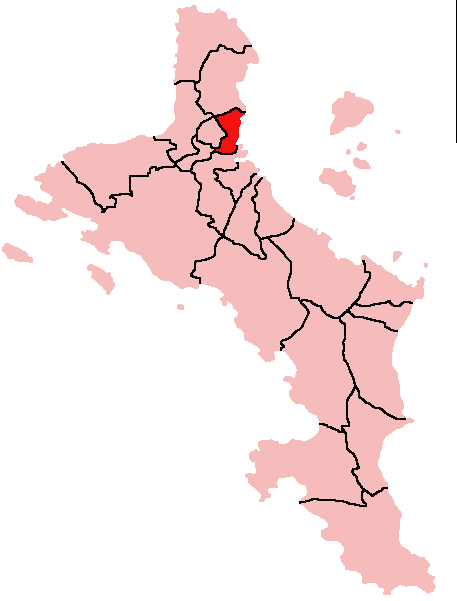
District Map
