= Eric Joyce (disambiguation) =

Eric Joyce (born 1960) is a British politician.

Eric Joyce may also refer to:

- Eric Joyce, husband of Day Joyce (née Sage, 1905-1975) who created the secret diary Day Joyce Sheet during the Pacific War
- Eric Joyce (American football) (born 1978), defensive back
- Eric Joyce (footballer) (1924–1977), English footballer
