= Romainville Island, Seychelles =

Artificial island in the Seychelles

Romainville Island
Nickname: Ile de Romainville
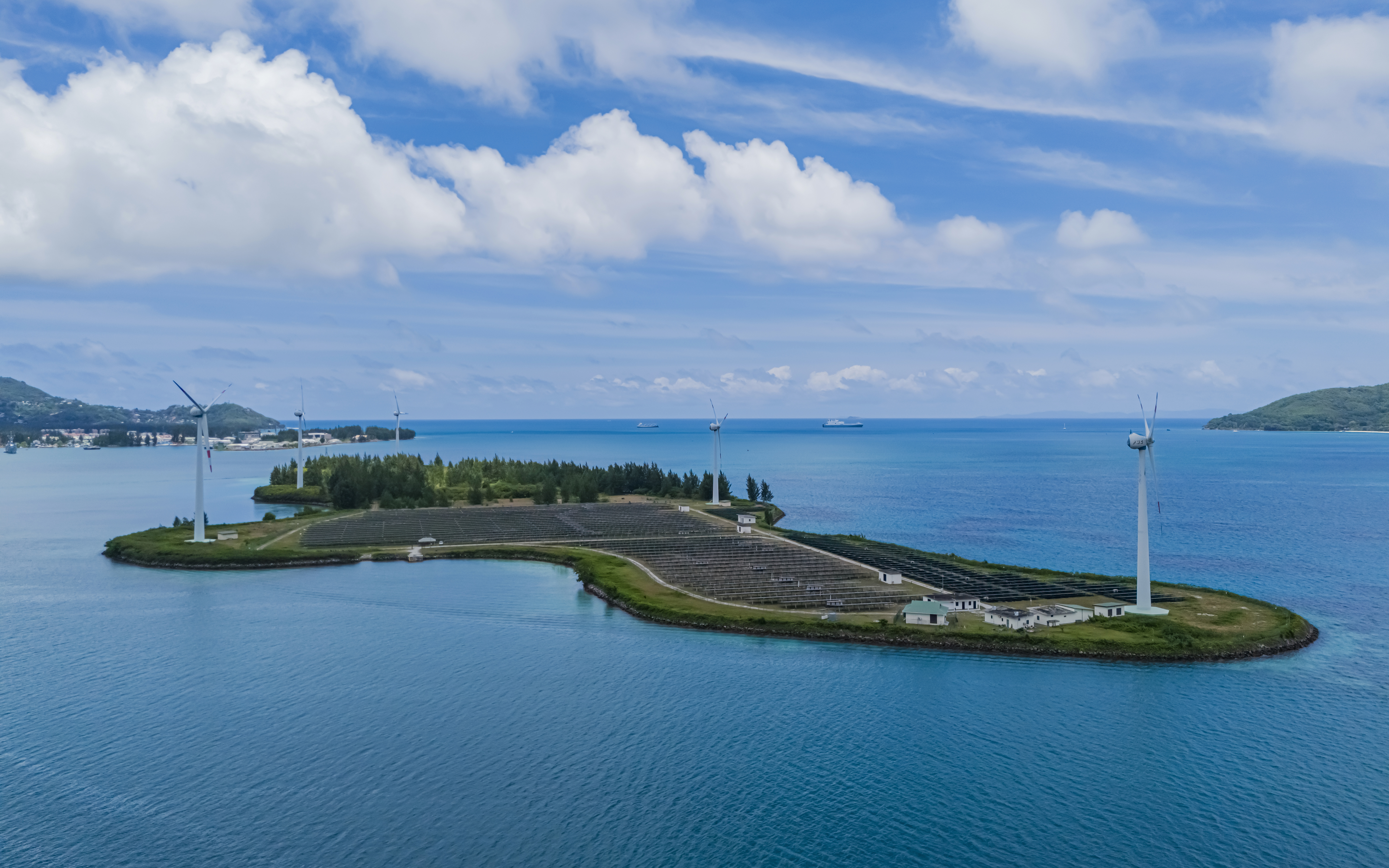
- Aerial view of Romainville Island

- Location within Seychelles

Geography
- Location: Seychelles, Indian Ocean
- Coordinates: 4°37′S 55°28′E
- Archipelago: Inner Islands, Seychelles
- Adjacent to: Indian Ocean
- Total islands: 1
- Major islands: Romainville
- Area: 0.194 km^{2} (0.075 sq mi)
- Length: 1.0 km (0.62 mi)
- Width: 0.3 km (0.19 mi)
- Coastline: 2.4 km (1.49 mi)
- Highest elevation: 0 m (0 ft)

Administration
- Seychelles
- Group: Granitic Seychelles
- Sub-Group: Mahe Islands
- Sub-Group: Mahe Port Islands
- Districts: English River
- Largest settlement: Romainville (pop. 2)

Demographics
- Population: 2 (2014)
- Pop. density: 10.3/km^{2} (26.7/sq mi)
- Ethnic groups: Creole, French, East Africans, Indians.

Additional information
- Time zone: SCT (UTC+4)
- ISO code: SC-16
- Official website: www.puc.sc

Romainville Island is an artificial island in Seychelles, lying 2 km from the capital Victoria.

== History ==
The island was created artificially during the 2000s. It belongs to the Mahe Port Islands, which are mostly artificial islands created by funds from Dubai when the Dubai dredger was placed in Seychelles. The works began in 1998. In 2012 the island was ready for installment of wind turbines. In 2013 the island was visited by UN inspectors inspecting worldwide scale of wind farms. In the end of 2013 the wind farm was launched. In 2014, it was reported that the PUC farm on Romainville was a success. In 2018, Masdar will open a solar farm on the island.

== Geography ==
The artificial island plan is an industrialized plan.

== Demographics ==
The warden's house is located on the island's south point.

== Administration ==
The island belongs to English River District.

== Image gallery ==
Map 1

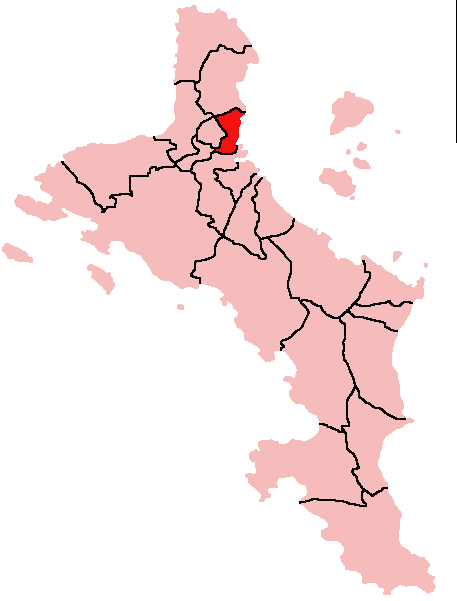
District Map
