= Ile de Romainville Solar Park =

Photovoltaic power plant in Romainville Island, Mont Fleuri, Seychelles

- Country: Seychelles
- Location: Romainville Island, Mont Fleuri
- Coordinates: 4°37′36.7″S 55°28′16.6″E
- Status: Operational
- Commission date: 2022

Power generation
- Nameplate capacity: 5 MW
- Storage capacity: 3.3 MWh

The Ile de Romainville Solar Park is a photovoltaic power station in Romainville Island, Mont Fleuri, Seychelles.

== History ==
Masdar commissioned the 6 MW Port Victoria Wind Farm in 2013. Five years later, the Romainville solar park was announced, and commissioned in 2022.

== Description ==
The power station has an installed capacity of 5 MW. It has an electricity storage capacity of 3.3 MWh and it is connected to the Mahé Island with a 33kV transmission line.

The construction of the power station was financed by Abu Dhabi Fund for Development. It was developed by Masdar and Public Utilities Corporation. It is part of Abu Dhabi Fund for Development's $350 million seven-cycle financing to support renewable energy projects in developing nations.

== See also ==
- Renewable energy in Seychelles
