= Victoria, Seychelles =

Capital city of Seychelles

Victoria
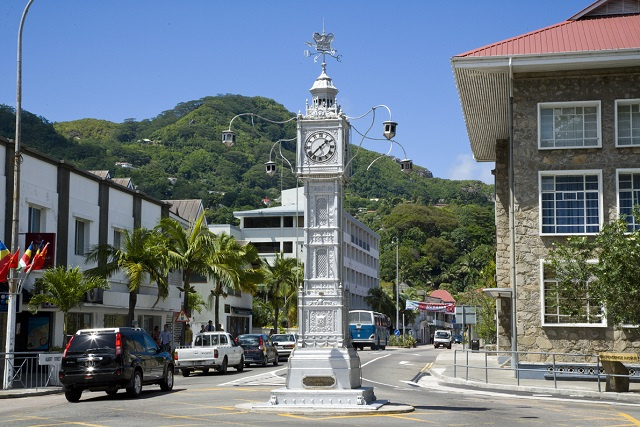
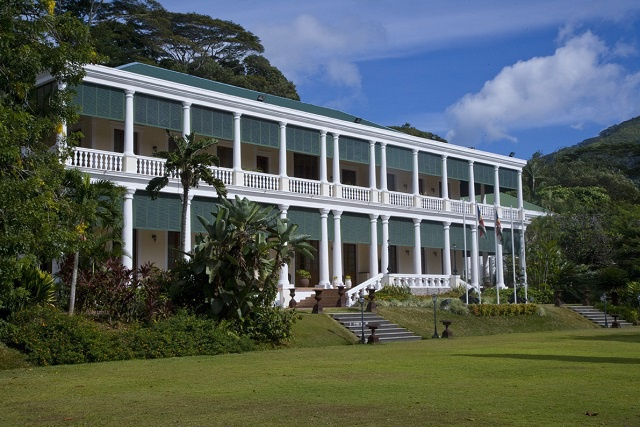
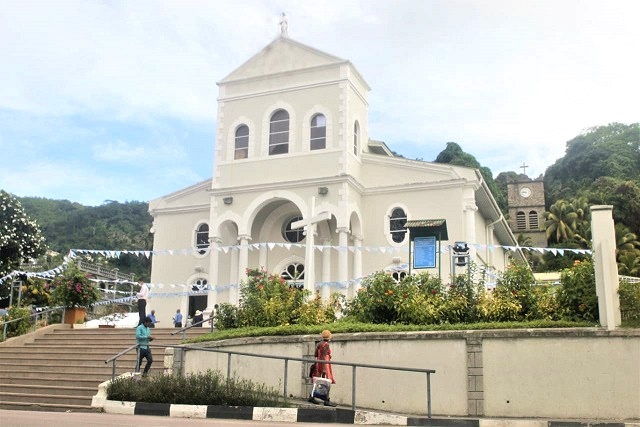
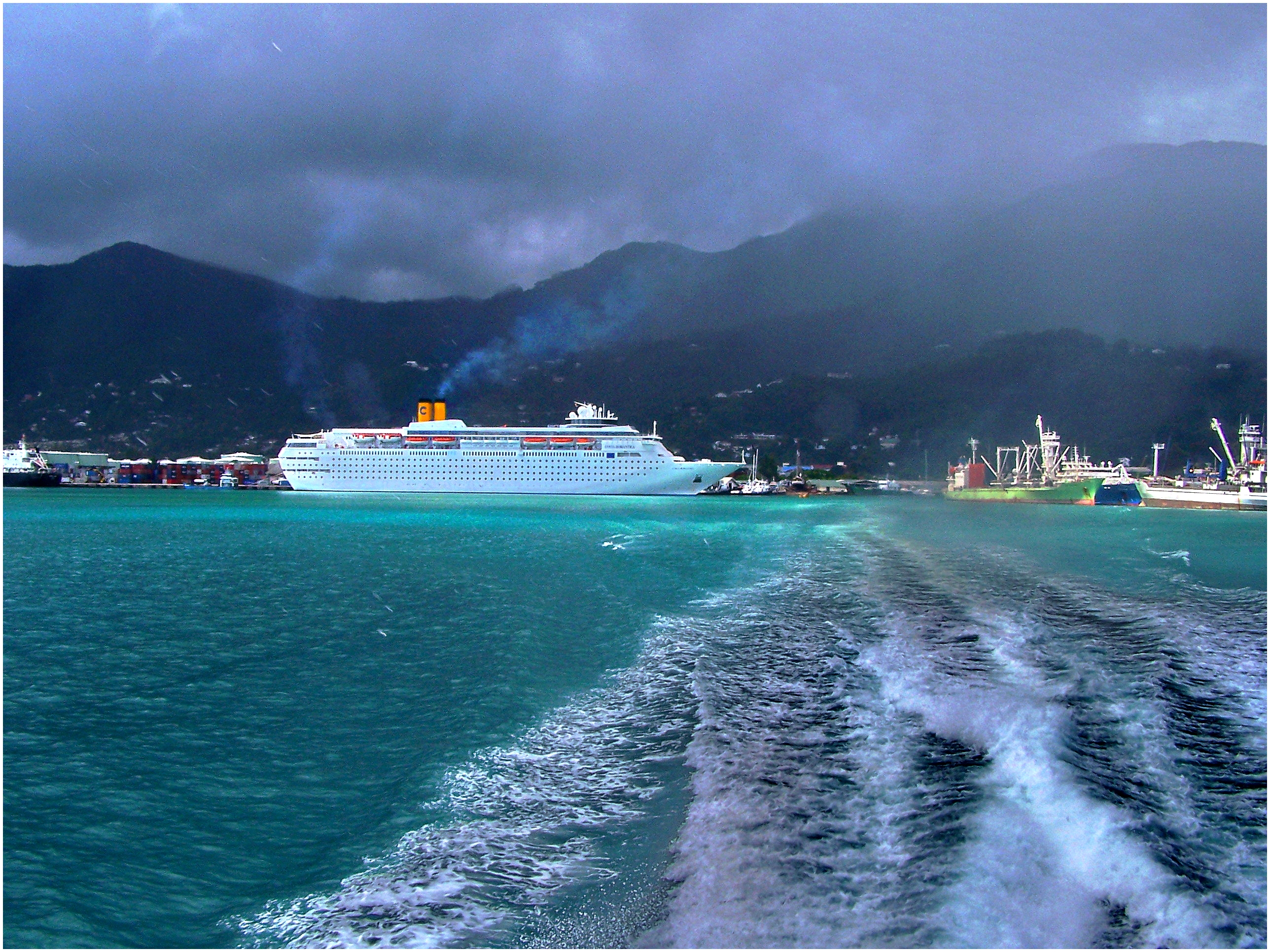
- Clockwise from top: Victoria clock tower, Cathedral of Victoria, Port Victoria, Seychelles State House.

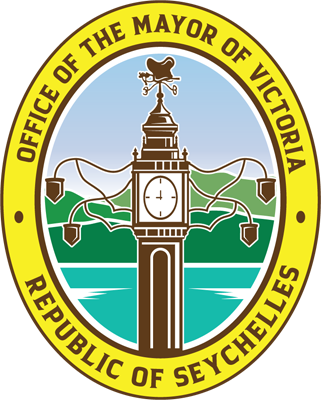
- Seal

- Location within Seychelles Location within Africa
- Coordinates: 4°37′23″S 55°27′09″E
- Country: Seychelles
- Island: Mahé

Government
  - Mayor: Josy Michaud Payet

Area
  - Total: 20.1 km^{2} (7.8 sq mi)

Population (2022)
  - Total: 30,145
  - Density: 2,150/km^{2} (5,600/sq mi)
- Time zone: UTC+04:00 (SCT)
- Website: MayorsOfficeSeychelles.com

Victoria is the capital and largest city of Seychelles, situated on the north-eastern side of Mahé, the archipelago's main island. The city was first established as the seat of the British colonial government. In 2022, the Central region, comprising nine administrative districts within and around the capital, accounted for 30,145 (~30%) of the country's total population of 102,612. The port is known as Port Victoria.

== History ==
The area that would become Victoria was originally settled in 1778 by French colonists after they claimed the island in 1756. The town was called L'Établissement until 1841, when it was renamed to Victoria by the British, after Queen Victoria.

== Economy ==
Tourism is an important sector of the economy. The principal exports of Victoria are vanilla, coconuts, coconut oil, fish and guano.

== Education ==
The Mont Fleuri campus of the University of Seychelles is in Victoria.

== Culture ==
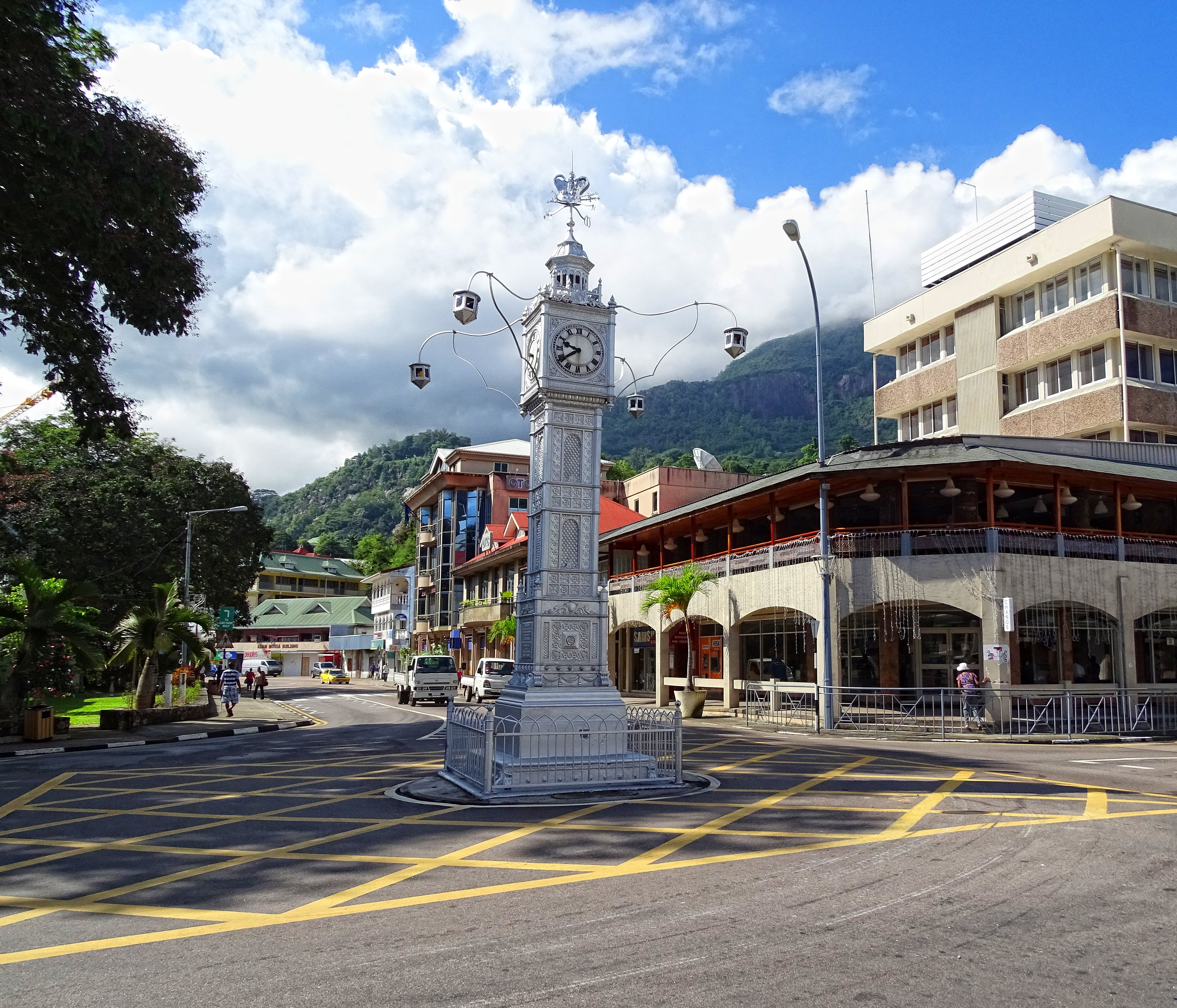
Victoria Clocktower Seychelles

Attractions in the city include a clocktower modelled on Little Ben in London, the courthouse, the Botanical Gardens, the National Museum of History, the Natural History Museum and the Sir Selwyn Selwyn-Clarke Market. Victoria Market and the brightly coloured fish and fruit markets is the local hot spot for the Seychellois people.

== Places of worship ==
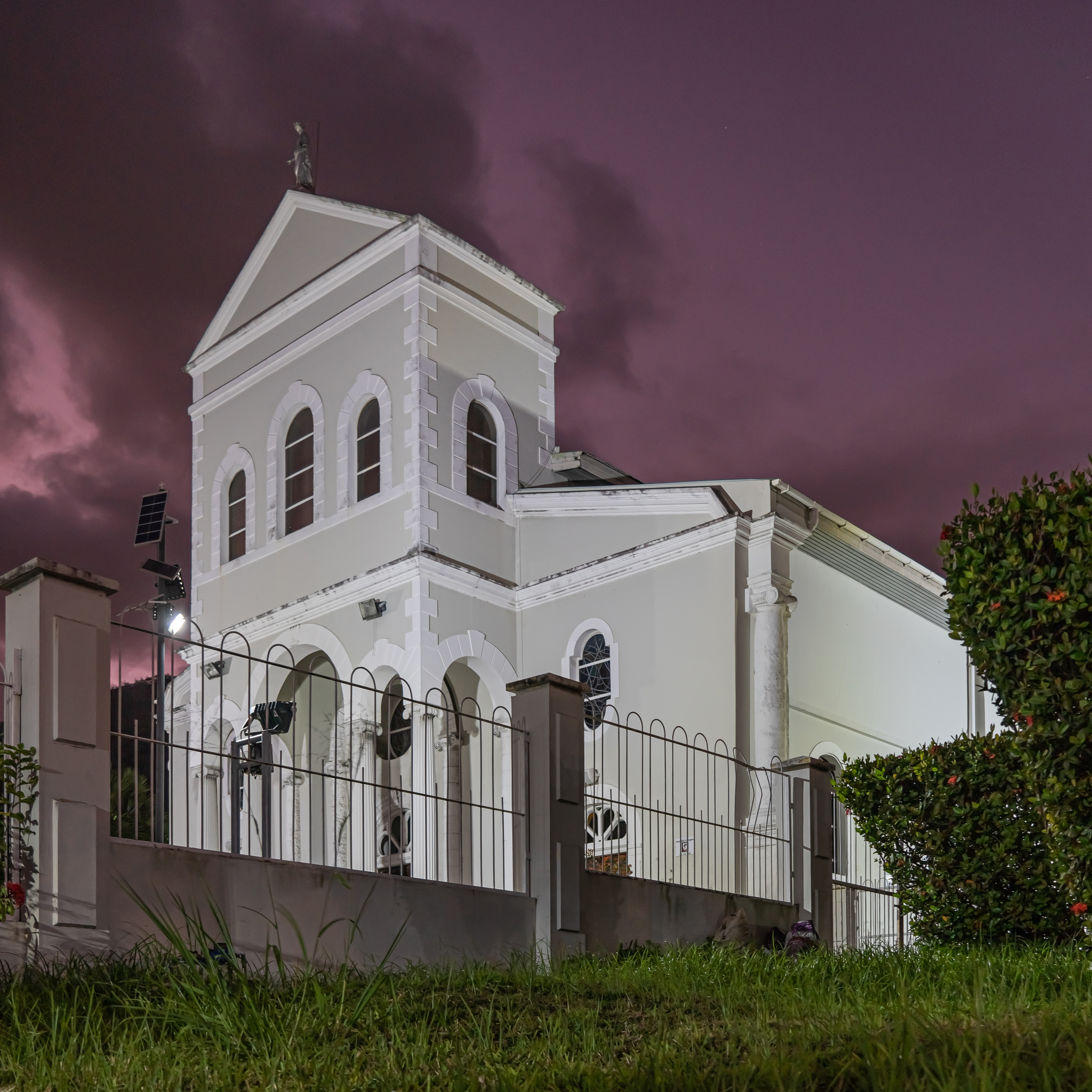
Immaculate Conception Cathedral

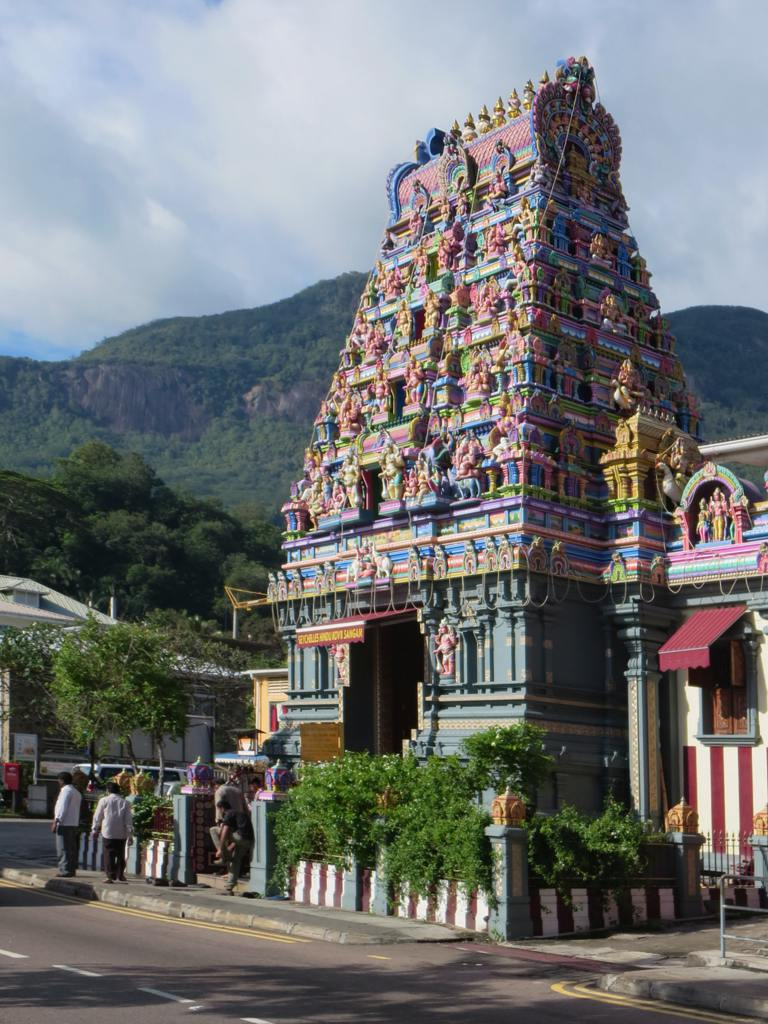
Arulmigu Navasakti Vinayagar Temple

There are two cathedrals in Victoria, Immaculate Conception Cathedral (Roman Catholic) and St Paul's Cathedral, Victoria (Anglican). There are also Baptist and Pentecostal churches, mosques and Hindu temples.

== Sports ==
Stade Linité, the national stadium, is in Victoria. It is mostly used for football matches.

== Transport ==
Victoria is served by Seychelles International Airport, completed in 1971. The inner harbour lies immediately east of the town, where tuna fishing and canning is a major industry. One of the largest bridges in Victoria was destroyed by tsunami waves from the 2004 Indian Ocean earthquake.

== Districts ==
Four of the districts of Seychelles are in Victoria:

- English River (La Rivière Anglaise), the central district
- Saint Louis
- Mont Fleuri
- Bel Air

== Twin towns and sister cities ==
Victoria is twinned with:

Country	City
Djibouti	Djibouti
Israel	Daliyat al-Karmel
China	Haikou

== Climate ==
Victoria features a tropical rainforest climate (Köppen climate classification Af) with high temperatures throughout the course of the year. The capital does have noticeably wetter and drier periods during the year, with June and July being its driest months and December through February being the city's wettest months. However, since in no month does the average monthly precipitation falls below 60 millimetres or 2.4 inches in Victoria, the city does not have a true dry season month. This lack of a true dry season month is a primary reason why the climate falls under the tropical rainforest climate category. The capital averages about 2,300 millimetres or 91 inches of rainfall annually. Although being very rainy, skies are usually clear to partly clear and completely cloudy days remain scarce throughout the year even during the rainiest months.

Victoria, Seychelles

Climate chart (precipitation, max. and min. temperature)
J	F	M	A	M	J	J	A	S	O	N	D
401 30 24	270 31 25	196 31 25	188 32 25	146 31 26	103 29 25	80 28 24	114 29 24	150 29 24	193 30 25	205 30 24	303 30 24
- █ Average max. and min. temperatures in °C
- █ Precipitation totals in mm
Imperial conversion
J	F	M	A	M	J	J	A	S	O	N	D
16 86 76	11 87 77	7.7 88 77	7.4 89 78	5.7 87 78	4.1 85 77	3.2 83 75	4.5 83 75	5.9 85 76	7.6 86 76	8.1 86 76	12 86 76
- █ Average max. and min. temperatures in °F
- █ Precipitation totals in inches

Climate data for Victoria (Seychelles International Airport) 1991–2020
Month	Jan	Feb	Mar	Apr	May	Jun	Jul	Aug	Sep	Oct	Nov	Dec	Year
Record high °C (°F)	33.3 (91.9)	33.4 (92.1)	33.7 (92.7)	34.8 (94.6)	33.5 (92.3)	32.7 (90.9)	31.3 (88.3)	31.4 (88.5)	31.6 (88.9)	32.5 (90.5)	34.4 (93.9)	33.4 (92.1)	34.8 (94.6)
Mean daily maximum °C (°F)	30.1 (86.2)	30.6 (87.1)	31.3 (88.3)	31.7 (89.1)	30.9 (87.6)	29.5 (85.1)	28.7 (83.7)	28.8 (83.8)	29.4 (84.9)	30.1 (86.2)	30.4 (86.7)	30.5 (86.9)	30.2 (86.4)
Daily mean °C (°F)	27.1 (80.8)	27.8 (82.0)	28.2 (82.8)	28.5 (83.3)	28.2 (82.8)	27.1 (80.8)	26.3 (79.3)	26.3 (79.3)	26.8 (80.2)	27.2 (81.0)	27.3 (81.1)	27.3 (81.1)	27.3 (81.1)
Mean daily minimum °C (°F)	24.6 (76.3)	25.3 (77.5)	25.4 (77.7)	25.6 (78.1)	25.9 (78.6)	25.1 (77.2)	24.3 (75.7)	24.4 (75.9)	24.7 (76.5)	24.9 (76.8)	24.7 (76.5)	24.6 (76.3)	25.0 (77.0)
Record low °C (°F)	21.5 (70.7)	21.1 (70.0)	22.1 (71.8)	22.0 (71.6)	21.6 (70.9)	20.9 (69.6)	20.4 (68.7)	19.6 (67.3)	20.2 (68.4)	20.5 (68.9)	21.5 (70.7)	20.0 (68.0)	19.6 (67.3)
Average precipitation mm (inches)	426.6 (16.80)	250.8 (9.87)	204.5 (8.05)	196.3 (7.73)	171.4 (6.75)	121.8 (4.80)	79.9 (3.15)	114.9 (4.52)	183.6 (7.23)	191.2 (7.53)	214.9 (8.46)	298.1 (11.74)	2,454.1 (96.62)
Average relative humidity (%)	82.7	80.0	79.4	78.9	78.6	79.0	79.5	79.5	79.3	78.5	79.4	80.8	79.6
Average dew point °C (°F)	23.9 (75.0)	23.9 (75.0)	24.2 (75.6)	24.4 (75.9)	24.1 (75.4)	23.1 (73.6)	22.4 (72.3)	22.3 (72.1)	22.8 (73.0)	23.1 (73.6)	23.3 (73.9)	23.6 (74.5)	23.4 (74.2)
Mean monthly sunshine hours	155.1	177.8	217.4	239.0	250.4	215.7	234.4	235.3	210.2	223.7	203.1	176.1	2,538.2
Mean daily sunshine hours	5.0	6.2	6.9	7.7	8.2	7.5	7.5	7.5	7.3	7.3	6.8	5.7	6.97
Source 1: World Meteorological Organization
Source 2: Seychelles Meteorological Authority (extremes, mean daily sun 1972–2011)

Climate data for Victoria (Seychelles International Airport) 1972–2011
Month	Jan	Feb	Mar	Apr	May	Jun	Jul	Aug	Sep	Oct	Nov	Dec	Year
Record high °C (°F)	33.3 (91.9)	33.4 (92.1)	33.5 (92.3)	34.1 (93.4)	33.5 (92.3)	32.6 (90.7)	31.1 (88.0)	31.4 (88.5)	31.6 (88.9)	32.4 (90.3)	34.4 (93.9)	33.4 (92.1)	34.4 (93.9)
Mean daily maximum °C (°F)	29.9 (85.8)	30.5 (86.9)	31.1 (88.0)	31.5 (88.7)	30.7 (87.3)	29.2 (84.6)	28.4 (83.1)	28.6 (83.5)	29.2 (84.6)	29.9 (85.8)	30.2 (86.4)	30.2 (86.4)	30.0 (86.0)
Daily mean °C (°F)	26.9 (80.4)	27.5 (81.5)	27.9 (82.2)	28.1 (82.6)	27.9 (82.2)	26.8 (80.2)	26.0 (78.8)	26.1 (79.0)	26.5 (79.7)	26.9 (80.4)	27.0 (80.6)	27.0 (80.6)	27.1 (80.8)
Mean daily minimum °C (°F)	24.3 (75.7)	24.9 (76.8)	25.1 (77.2)	25.3 (77.5)	25.6 (78.1)	24.8 (76.6)	24.1 (75.4)	24.1 (75.4)	24.4 (75.9)	24.6 (76.3)	24.3 (75.7)	24.2 (75.6)	24.6 (76.3)
Record low °C (°F)	24.1 (75.4)	21.1 (70.0)	22.1 (71.8)	22.3 (72.1)	21.6 (70.9)	20.9 (69.6)	20.4 (68.7)	19.6 (67.3)	20.2 (68.4)	20.5 (68.9)	21.5 (70.7)	20.0 (68.0)	19.6 (67.3)
Average rainfall mm (inches)	401.3 (15.80)	270.2 (10.64)	195.5 (7.70)	188.1 (7.41)	146.0 (5.75)	102.9 (4.05)	80.3 (3.16)	114.2 (4.50)	150.0 (5.91)	192.8 (7.59)	205.0 (8.07)	303.2 (11.94)	2,349.5 (92.50)
Average relative humidity (%)	83	80	80	80	79	79	80	79	79	79	80	82	80
Mean monthly sunshine hours	155.0	175.2	213.9	231.0	254.2	225.0	232.5	232.5	219.0	226.3	204.0	176.7	2,545.3
Mean daily sunshine hours	5.0	6.2	6.9	7.7	8.2	7.5	7.5	7.5	7.3	7.3	6.8	5.7	6.97
Source: Seychelles National Meteorological Services

== See also ==
- Romainville Island, Seychelles
