= Sir Selwyn Selwyn-Clarke Market =

Fresh produce market in Victoria, Seychelles

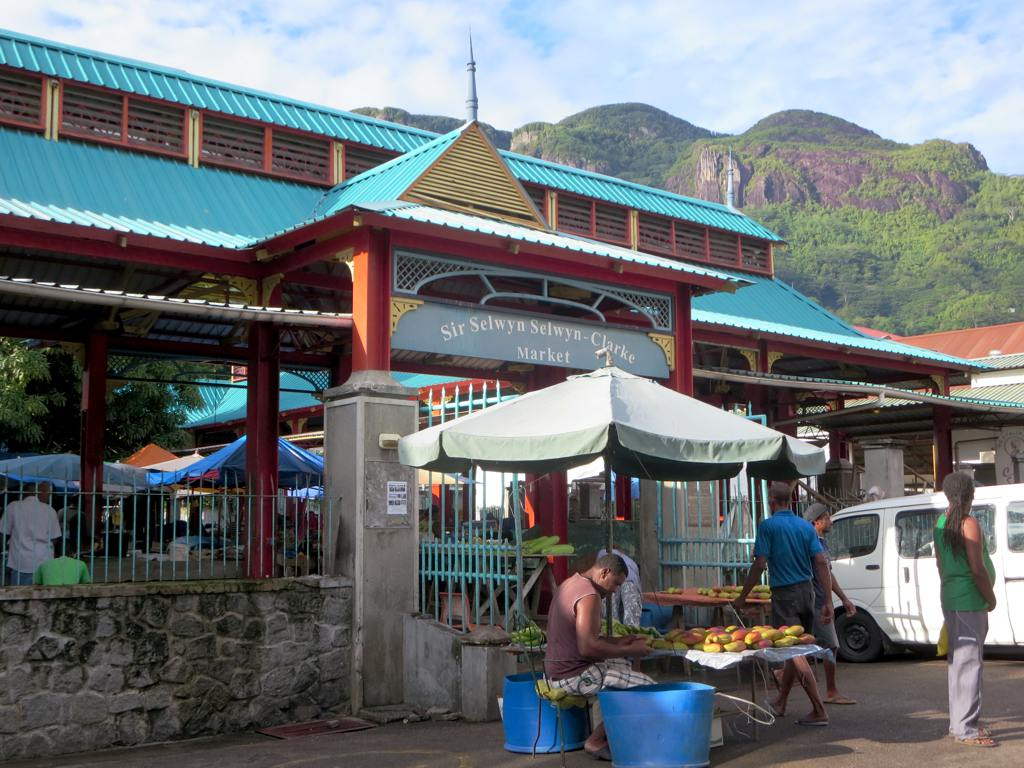
- Sir Selwyn Selwyn-Clarke Market (2013)
- Interactive map of Sir Selwyn Selwyn-Clarke Market
- Location: Victoria, Seychelles
- Coordinates: 4.621346767623129°S 55.451345391686814°E

Construction
- Commissioned: 1840

Sir Selwyn Selwyn-Clarke Market (also known as Victoria Market) is the main market of Victoria, Seychelles.

== History ==
Built-in 1840 and renovated in 1999, this early-Victorian-style market offers fresh produce, fish, meat, spices, and affordable local crafts. The market was renamed the Selwyn-Clarke Market to honor Sir Selwyn Selwyn-Clarke as former Governor of Seychelles.

Open Monday to Friday until late afternoon, it's busiest on Saturdays and usually closed on Sundays.

As of March 2025, the market is undergoing renovations and has been temporarily moved to the former STC Supermarket in Victoria.

== Gallery ==
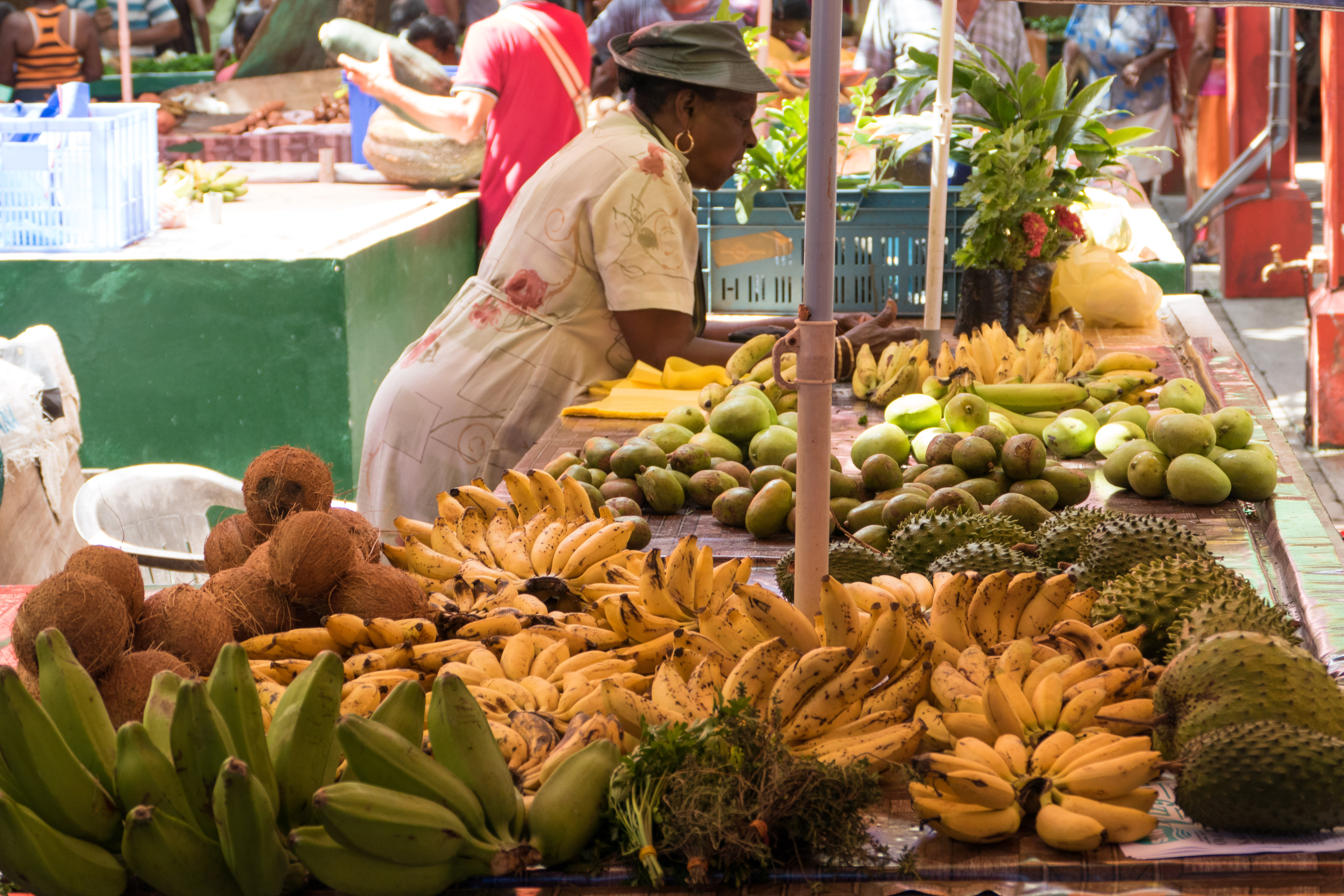
The vendors and produce in the market in 2014

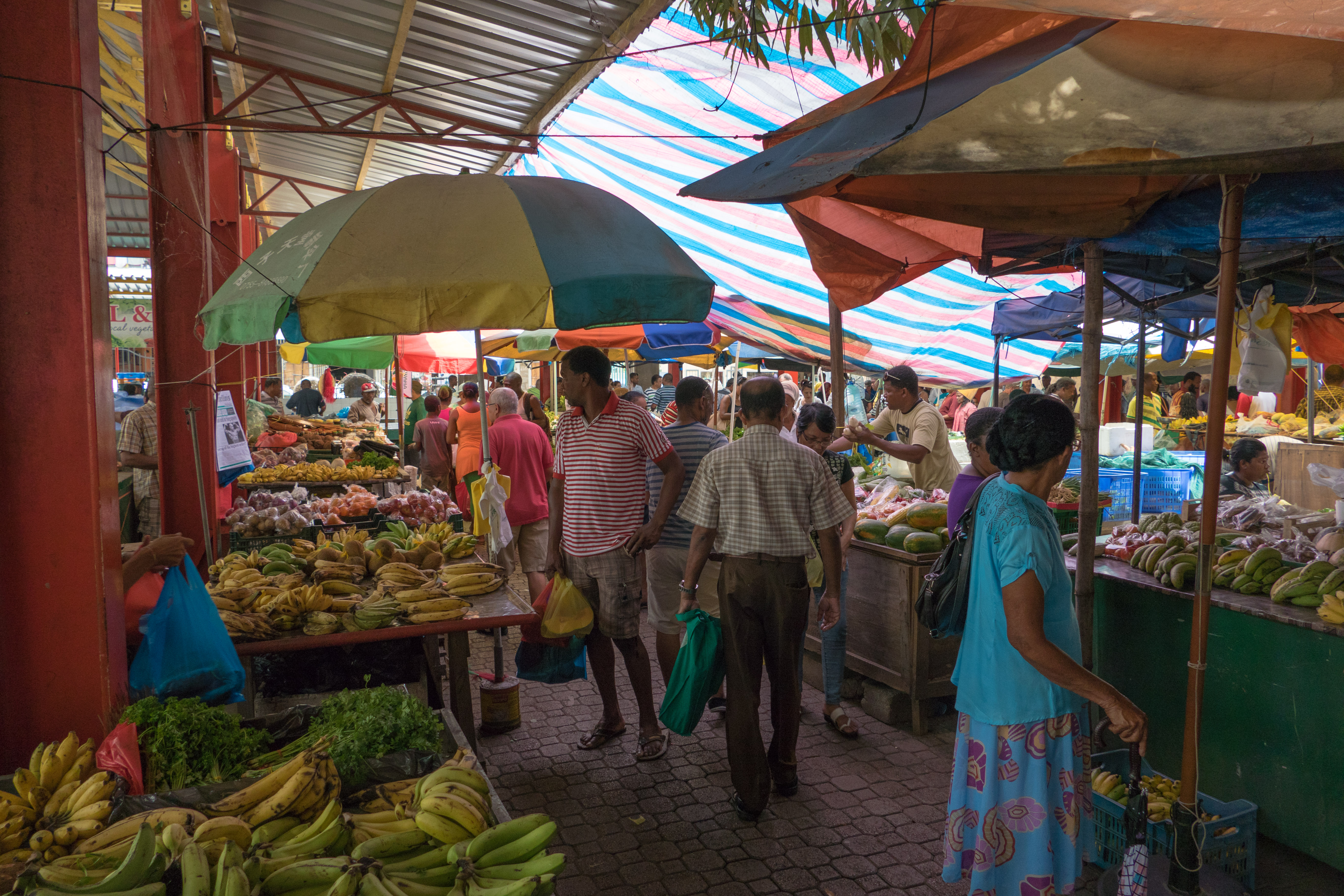
The vendors and produce in the market in 2014

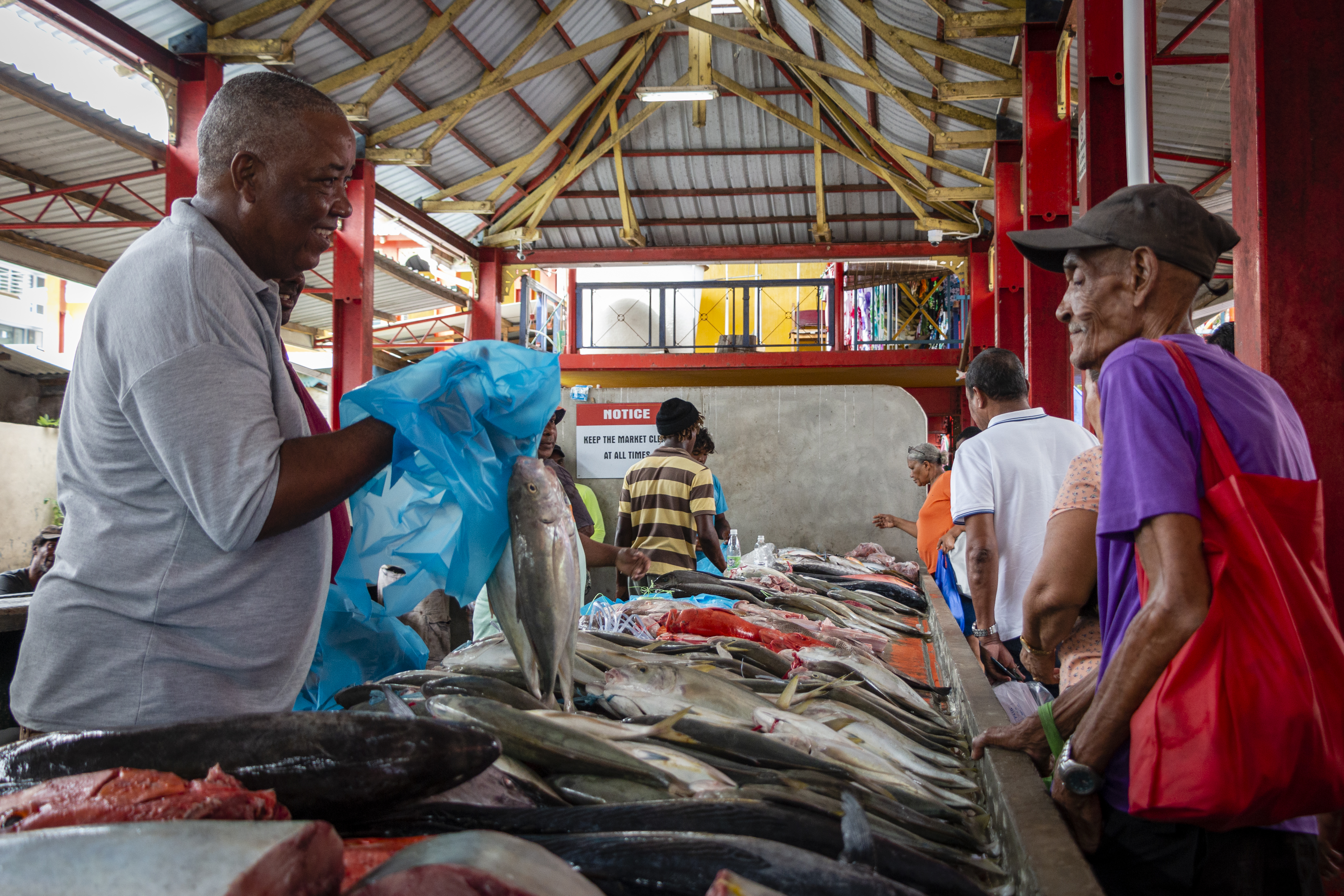
Catch of the day at the market in 2019
