= Seychelles Natural History Museum =

Museum in Victoria, Seychelles

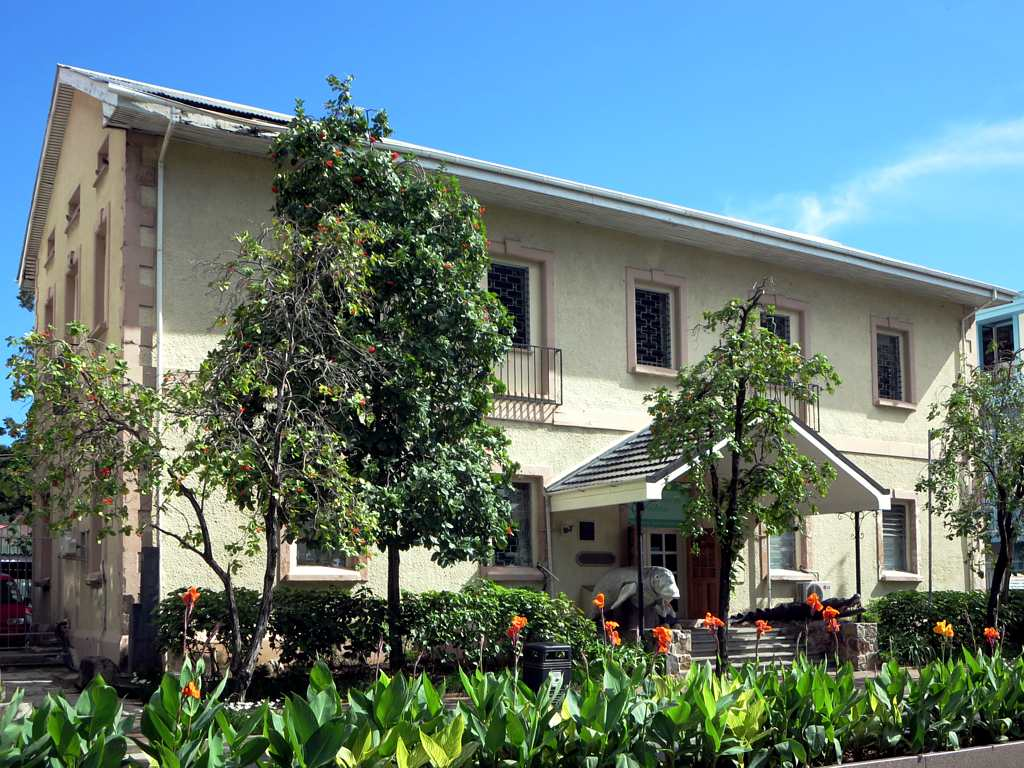
- Established: 1964
- Location: Victoria, Mahé, Seychelles
- Coordinates: 4.623°S 55.453°E

The Seychelles Natural History Museum is a natural history museum in the Seychelles.

== Location ==
The museum is located in next to the main post office in Victoria, the capital of the Seychelles, on Mahé Island.

== Galleries ==
The displays include sections on botany, zoology, geology and anthropology. There are also some items related to the history of the Seychelles People's Militia, the Seychelles People's Liberation Army and the Seychelles People's Defence Forces.

== See also ==
- Seychelles National Museum of History
