= Stanley Internment Camp =

Civilian internment camp in Hong Kong

Stanley Internment Camp 赤柱拘留營
- Internment camp
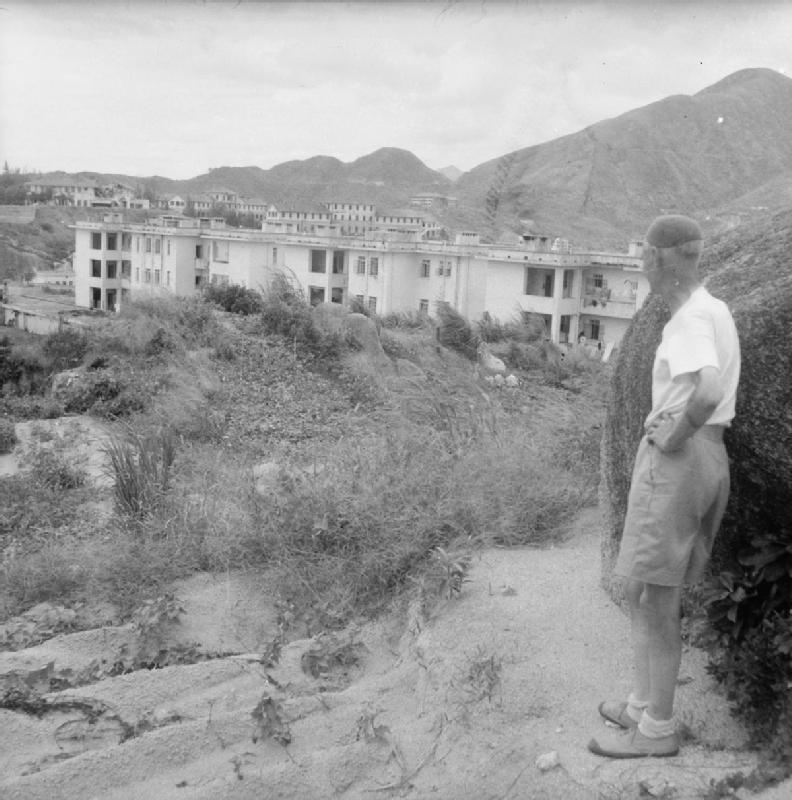
- One of the former internees looks at Stanley Internment Camp
- Coordinates: 22.2158°N 114.21661°E
- Location: Stanley, Hong Kong
- Operated by: Japan
- Original use: School and prison
- Operational: January 1942 - 16 August 1945
- Inmates: Non-Chinese civilians
- Number of inmates: 2,800

Stanley Internment Camp (Chinese: 赤柱拘留營) was a civilian internment camp in Hong Kong during the Second World War. Located in Stanley, on the southern end of Hong Kong Island, it was used by the Japanese imperial forces to hold non-Chinese enemy nationals after their victory in the Battle of Hong Kong in December 1941. About 2,800 men, women, and children were held at the non-segregated camp for 44 months from early January 1942 to August 1945 when Japanese forces surrendered. The camp area consisted of St Stephen's College and the grounds of Stanley Prison, excluding the prison itself.

== Evacuation and arrival at camp ==
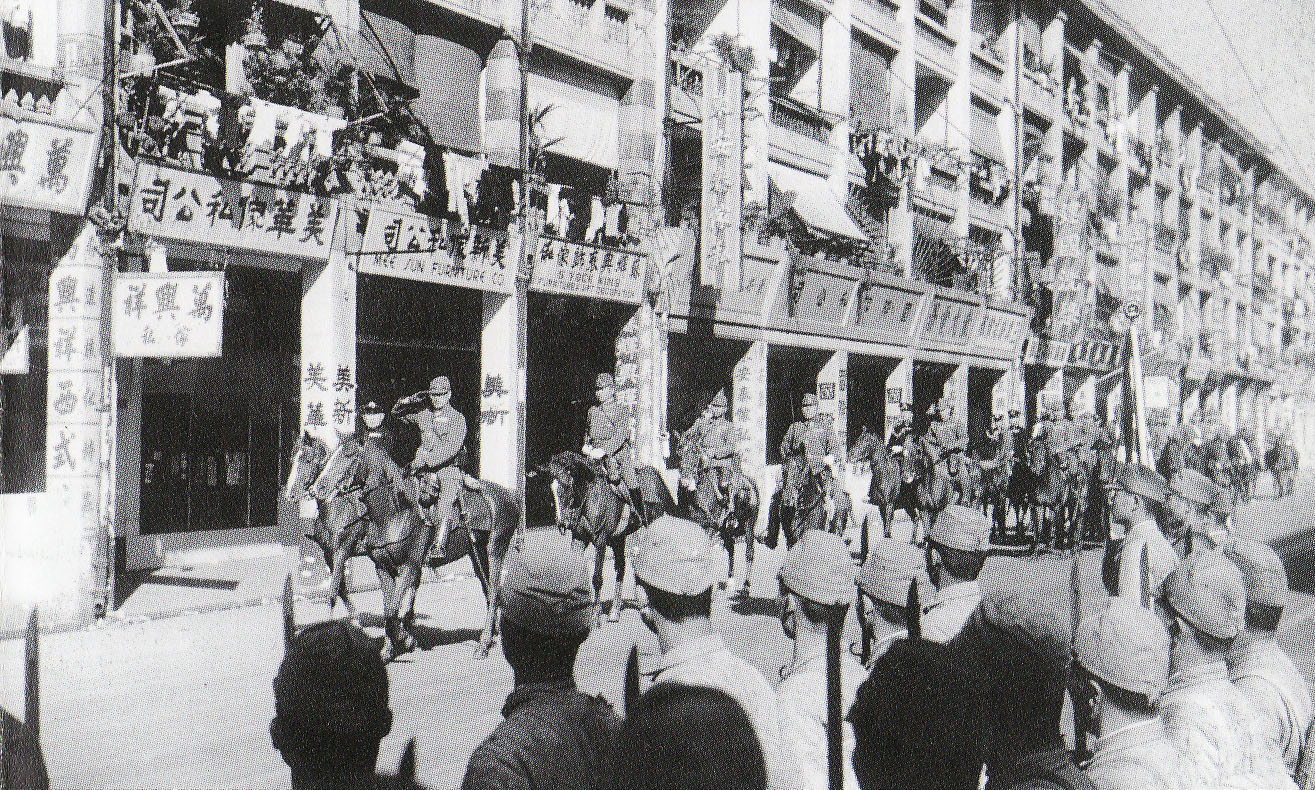
Japanese troops march on Queen's Road, Hong Kong in December 1941, after the British surrender

In 1939, the British government had drawn up evacuation plans for the British and other European residents of Hong Kong, which was a Crown colony of the United Kingdom (UK) at the time. The War Office thought the city would inevitably fall to Japanese forces in the event of an attack, so it should not be reinforced with more defensive forces. The presence of a large number of British women and children would have been an "embarrassment" for the government when the Japanese forces took Hong Kong, and additionally it was thought the internment of thousands of British civilians would cause unnecessary suffering and serve the Japanese as propaganda material. In July 1940, the colonial government of Hong Kong received orders from the UK to proceed with the evacuations. By 3 August, all service families and registered non-service British women and children were moved to the Philippines. However, the hurried compulsory evacuations prompted criticism from many evacuees, their husbands, and their employees, who felt the evacuations were premature and unnecessary. According to historians Bernice Archer and Kent Fedorowich, the local Chinese population were angered by their exclusion from the evacuations and condemned the plans as racist. Additionally, the plans excluded British passport holders who were not of European ancestry. Amidst the criticism, the government subsequently made the evacuations non-compulsory. Existing evacuations already ordered were cancelled provided evacuees volunteered for auxiliary roles, such as nursing or administrative work.

On 8 December 1941 Japanese forces attacked Hong Kong, marking the start of the Battle of Hong Kong. Seventeen days later, on Christmas Day of 1941, which came to be known as "Black Christmas", the Hong Kong government surrendered, and Hong Kong came under Japanese occupation. On 4 January 1942, a notice appeared in an English-language newspaper that all "enemy nationals" were to assemble on Murray Parade Grounds. Many people did not see the notice, but about 1,000 people were eventually gathered on the grounds. In addition to those who gathered voluntarily, there were people forcibly removed from their homes.

The people assembled were marched to and initially interned in hotel-brothels on the waterfront near the present-day Macau Ferry Pier. The conditions there were dirty and overcrowded, and the food was poor. After 17 days, the internees were taken by boat to Stanley. The "enemy nationals" who failed to assemble on Murray Parade Grounds avoided internment at the hotel-brothels. However, by the end of January, most of the civilians to be interned were moved to Stanley. Upon arrival at camp, the internees discovered little was prepared for them there. There were no cooking facilities, no furniture, little crockery or cutlery. The toilet facilities were dirty, inadequate, and without water. The rooms were soon overcrowded with random assortments of people unrelated to each other, and with little attention paid to hygiene or public health.

== Camp grounds ==
A map of Stanley Internment Camp

The Stanley site was chosen by the Japanese through consultation with two Hong Kong government officials – Dr. P. S. Selwyn-Clarke, Director of Medical Services, and F. C. Gimson, the Colonial Secretary. Located on Stanley Peninsula, which was about nine kilometres from the city at the time, the camp consisted of St. Stephen's College and the grounds of Stanley Prison, excluding the prison itself; the prison was used by the Japanese authorities to hold what they considered "criminals" from Hong Kong. Several hundred internees lived at St. Stephen's, while the majority of them lived on the prison grounds. Prior to Japanese occupation, St. Stephen's was a secondary school whose facilities, in addition to classrooms, included an assembly hall, bungalows for teachers, and science laboratories. Over twenty internees occupied each bungalow, which was built for one family, and more than that occupied each science laboratory, living between partitions of sacking and old blankets. Almost all the buildings in the camp were used for housing.

Certain buildings and areas on the prison grounds had specific functions:

- The Prison Officers' Club was used for multiple functions, including as a canteen, a kindergarten, Catholic church, and recreation centre.
- Two main divisions of quarters existed – the Warders' Quarters and the Indian Quarters. Before the war, the Warders' Quarters housed European warders, with large flats designed for one family each, and the Indian Quarters housed Indian prison guards, built with smaller flats. An average of thirty internees lived in each Warders' Quarters flat, and an average of six internees lived in each Indian Quarters flat.
- A building which had housed single Indian warders before the war was turned into a hospital called Tweed Bay Hospital.
- Two houses, originally used as homes for the prison superintendent and the prison doctor, were turned into the Japanese headquarters for the camp.
- The cemetery on the grounds became a popular spot for quiet relaxation as well as a place for intimate meetings between male and female internees.

== Life at camp ==
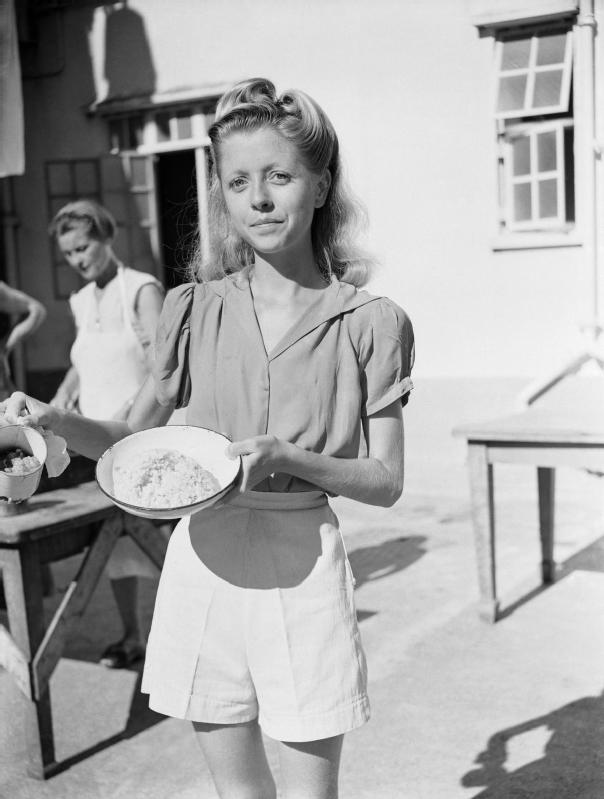
Photo of a former internee, taken after the camp was liberated in 1945, holding the amount of daily rations of rice and stew for her room, which housed five people

The internees numbered at 2,800, of which an estimated 2,325 to 2,514 were British. The adult population numbered at 1,370 men and 858 women, and children 16 years of age or younger numbered at 286, with 99 of whom were below the age of 4. The camp was under the control of the Japanese Foreign Affairs Department, but according to historian Geoffrey Charles Emerson, the Japanese forces had not made plans for dealing with enemy civilians in Hong Kong. As such, the camp was provided with few necessities, and the internees were left to govern the camp themselves. Committees were formed for such matters as housing, food, and medical care. The national groups remained mostly independent of each other except for matters of welfare and medical care. Very few government servants were selected to serve on these committees, due to anti-government sentiment; most internees blamed the government for the quick surrender of Hong Kong.

The biggest concern was food; ensuring there was enough food occupied most of the internees' time. Little food was provided by the Japanese authorities, and it was of poor quality – frequently containing dust, mud, rat and cockroach excreta, cigarette ends, and sometimes dead rats. Every day, the internees were served rice congee at 8 am, and meals consisting of rice with stew at both 11 a.m. and 5 p.m. Additionally, they relied on food mailed from friends or relatives in the city, Red Cross aid, garden-grown vegetables, and bought food from the canteen or the black market.

Another concern was the health and medical care of the internees. Although medical facilities were inadequate, the internees counted amongst them about 40 doctors, two dentists, six pharmacists, 100 trained nurses, and a large number of volunteer auxiliary nurses. Because of this, according to historian G. B. Endacott, no major epidemic occurred. The most common sickness amongst the internees were malaria, malnutrition and its associated diseases, beriberi, and pellagra. The shortage of medical supplies and equipment posed a challenge for those in charge of medical care, with the lack of soap and disinfectant being a particularly troublesome concern.

The women and children contributed to a sense of normality as their presence provided conventional social, family, and gender relations. The internees believed the children's presence made them less selfish, as it forced them to think of the latter's welfare. The women organised Christmas and birthday celebrations. Other diversions such as musicals, plays, recitals, and variety shows were also staged. Although the camp lacked books and educational supplies, the teachers and educational administrators amongst the internees were able to provide lessons for the children at the primary and secondary levels. Additionally, extensive educational opportunities were available for the adults: language courses for Chinese, Malay, and French, and also lectures on photography, yachting, journalism, and poultry-keeping. In addition to the personal diaries kept by internees, many of them now held by the Imperial War Museum, a record of life in the camp was created using a double bed sheet. The Day Joyce Sheet was embroidered and appliquéd with 1100 names, signs and figures including a diary in code.

== Deaths ==
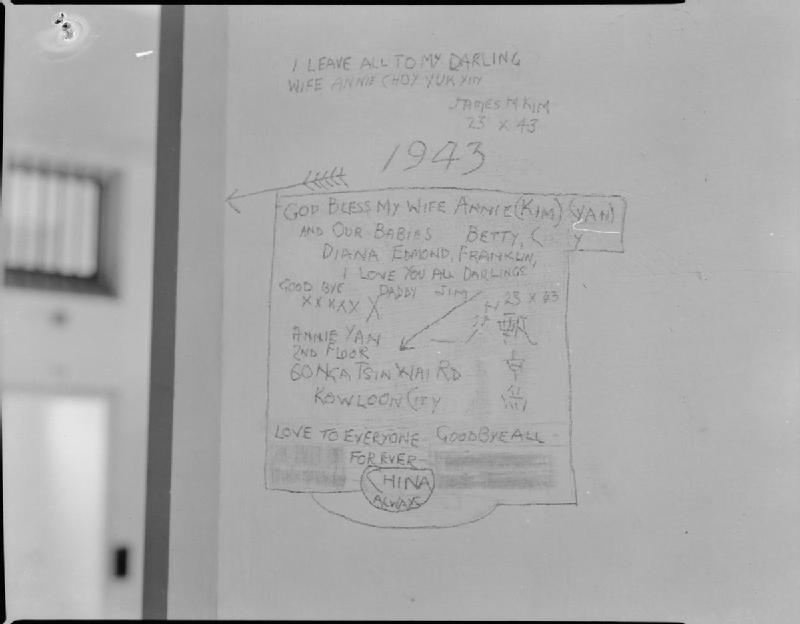
Last will and messages of executed internee James M. Kim

Records show that 121 internees died in the camp, mostly due to illness, with half the deaths being of internees over the age of 50. There were also a few accidental deaths. Two internees died from falls and one child drowned. The worst accident occurred during the large US Navy attack against Hong Kong on 16 January 1945, when a plane accidentally bombed Bungalow 5 at St. Stephen's College, killing 14 internees. These internees were buried at Stanley Military Cemetery.

Another seven internees were executed by the Japanese authorities. These internees had possessed a radio set which they used to pass messages in and out of camp. The radio was discovered by the Japanese and the internees were arrested. The other internees were forced to watch their public torture. Military trials were subsequently held and on 29 October 1943, some of the internees were executed by being shot and at least one, John Fraser, was beheaded. Aside from this, the Japanese authorities had executed by decapitation three Chinese policemen for bringing cigarettes and tobacco to the camp's internees.

== Escape attempts ==
A number of factors made escape attempts daunting for the internees. They would have to navigate through Japanese-occupied territory, find food, and as few internees spoke Cantonese, they would also have to deal with the language barrier if they succeeded in escaping. Despite these difficulties, there were three major escape attempts, of which two in March 1942 were successful. One group of eight internees escaped on a small boat to neighbouring Macau. Another group, consisting of two internees, escaped through the New Territories and into mainland China. The third group, four policemen, in April 1942 managed to escape the camp grounds but were caught within a few miles of camp. They were subsequently imprisoned and released back to camp after a few weeks.

== Early repatriation ==
Repatriation was one of the two most talked-about subjects at camp (the other being food). On 6 May 1942, the Japanese authorities informed the internees repatriation for the Americans would take place on 15 June. Japanese treatment of the American internees improved during this period before the actual repatriation took place; more and better food was given to them, and they were allowed contacts with Chinese friends outside of camp. American journalists were interviewed by a Japanese news agency and asked questions about the war and the camp. The internees came to find out later the interview became war propaganda for the Japanese, in the form of an article claiming that American journalists had complimented the Japanese military and the camp itself, stating the camp was "probably the most comfortable in the world." It was not until 29 June that repatriation for the Americans finally took place, after Japanese and Thai citizens held in the US and South America boarded ships in late June in preparation for exchange of internees. Those being repatriated were given smallpox vaccination, cholera inoculation, and thorough medical examinations. No books, bibles, diaries, or addresses were allowed to leave with the Americans, but the remaining internees were each allowed to write a 150-word letter for the Americans to take with them. The American internees boarded the ship, the Asama Maru, along with other Americans who had been allowed to stay in Hong Kong outside of the camp. After picking up Americans for repatriation from other locations in Asia, the Asama Maru arrived at Maputo, Mozambique (then called Lourenço Marques) on 22 July, where the Americans and Japanese exchanged internees. The Americans were to finally reach New York City on 25 August. Reportedly a total of 377 Americans were repatriated from Hong Kong.

Repatriation of Canadian internees and remaining American internees was announced in August 1943 (not all American internees had been repatriated in June 1942). Preparations similar to the prior repatriation were made, including messages and reports to be delivered. The ship, the Teia Maru, reached Hong Kong on 23 September, taking on board 73 Canadian internees, 24 American internees, and 13 Latin American internees. The ship sailed to Goa, where an exchange of prisoners and internees with Japan took place.

There were indications and notices to the British internees that their repatriation was possible; Gimson told them a Swiss Red Cross representative had spoken "encouragingly" about repatriation, the Japanese authorities twice informed them (on 24 May 1943 and 2 November 1943) that they would be repatriated, and 25 May 1943 issue of the Hong Kong News reported negotiations for repatriation were "going on rather smoothly". Despite this, the British internees were not repatriated until the end of the war.

== Freedom ==
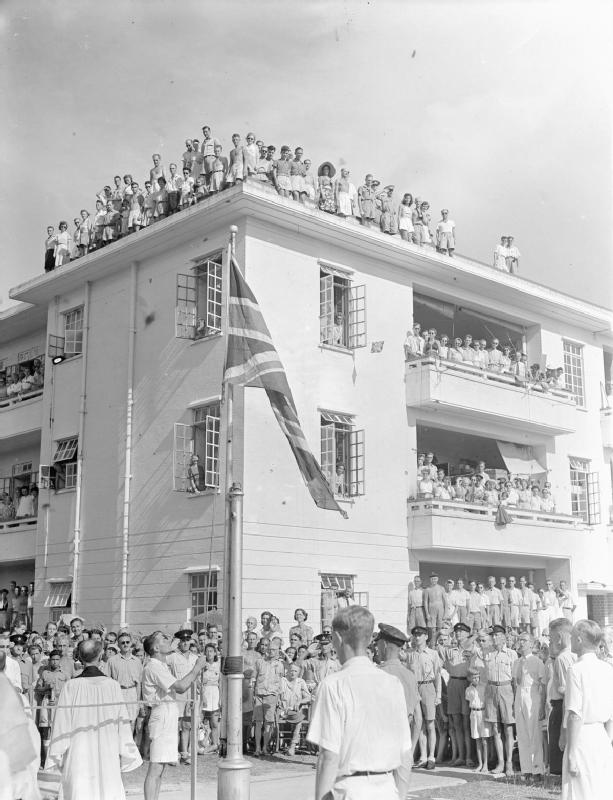
The Union Jack raised at camp after Japanese forces surrendered

The internees were freed on 16 August 1945, the day after Emperor Hirohito broadcast his acceptance of the Potsdam Proclamation in surrender. About two weeks later, the British fleet came for the internees, and several weeks after that, the camp was closed. Many internees went back to the city and began to adjust back to their former lives, and many others, particularly those of poor health, remained on the camp grounds to await for ships to take them away. Historian Geoffrey Charles Emerson wrote the "probable" reason the British internees were not repatriated before the end of the war was related to the Allied forces refusing to release Japanese nationals held in Australia. These nationals were the only sizeable group of Japanese nationals held by the Allies after the repatriation of the American and Canadian internees. They had been pearl fishermen in Australia before the war, and knew the Australian coastline well. Their knowledge would have been "militarily important" to the Japanese if an invasion of Australia was attempted, hence the Allied refusal to release them.

== Compensation ==
In 1948 the US government, through the War Claims Act, authorised a payment of US$60 for every month an adult spent in an internment camp, and US$25 per month for child internees. Some also received US$1 per day for "missed meals". In the UK, from 1952 to 1956, about 8,800 British internees, specifically those who normally resided in the UK when the war began, received a sum of £48.50 as reparation. Payments for American and British internees were made from the proceeds of Japanese assets seized per the Treaty of San Francisco. Dutch internees each received a sum of US$100, with the payments funded by a separate agreement signed between the Dutch and the Japanese in 1957.

The rise of Japan as an economic power and the opening of World War II files at the UK's Public Record Office created a sentiment in the 1990s that not enough had been done to redress the suffering of internees and prisoners-of-war. In November 2000, the British government announced a compensation scheme for British civilians who had been interned in World War II. The scheme called for a package of £167 million, and by February 2001, the first raft of payments of £10,000 were being made. Initially, the plan excluded British persons who had no "bloodlink" to Britain, a point of distinction that was made between those who were "British citizens" and those who were "British subjects".

In reaction to this, former Stanley internee Diana Elias launched a civil action case against the British government, alleging the distinction of "bloodlink" made by the compensation scheme was discriminatory, and that the Japanese authorities had made no such distinction in their treatment of the internees. Elias' family, including her parents and her grandparents, were all holders of British passports. The "bloodlink" distinction, however, made her ineligible for compensation because she is of Iraqi Jewish ancestry. In July 2005, the High Court in London ruled in her favour, and was subsequently backed by the Court of Appeals when the Ministry of Defence appealed the High Court's decision. This allowed for hundreds of surviving civilian internees to collect the compensation earlier denied to them by the "bloodlink" distinction.

== Post-war ==
St. Stephen's College was re-opened in 1945 after the war. St. Stephen's Chapel was built on the grounds of the school in 1950; the memorial window over its west door was a donation, serving to remember the suffering at Stanley Internment Camp.

== Notable internees ==
- Sir Mark Aitchison Young – Governor of Hong Kong
- Captain Mateen Ansari GC (c. 1915 – 29 October 1943) of the 5th Battalion, 7th Rajput Regiment
- Sir C. Grenville Alabaster – Attorney General of Hong Kong
- Morris Abraham Cohen
- Kenelm Hutchinson Digby
- Geoffrey Herklots
- Dorothy Hetty Fosbery Jenner (nee Gordon) - former film actress and newspaper columnist, better known as 'Andrea'
- Elly Kadoorie
- Sir Atholl MacGregor – Chief Justice of Hong Kong
- Ernest William Lunn Martin - Warden of St Stephens College and his wife who died in the camp.
- Lewis Morley
- Hilda Selwyn-Clarke
- Andrew Lusk Shields
- Francis Arthur Sutton
- Sir Franklin Charles Gimson KCMG KStJ – Colonial Secretary of Hong Kong and later Governor of Singapore

== See also ==
- Pacific War
- History of Hong Kong
- Japanese occupation of Hong Kong
- List of Japanese-run internment camps during World War II
- North Point Camp
- Second Sino-Japanese War
- St. Stephen's College massacre
- Battle of Hong Kong
