= Seychelles National Museum of History =

Museum in Victoria, Seychelles

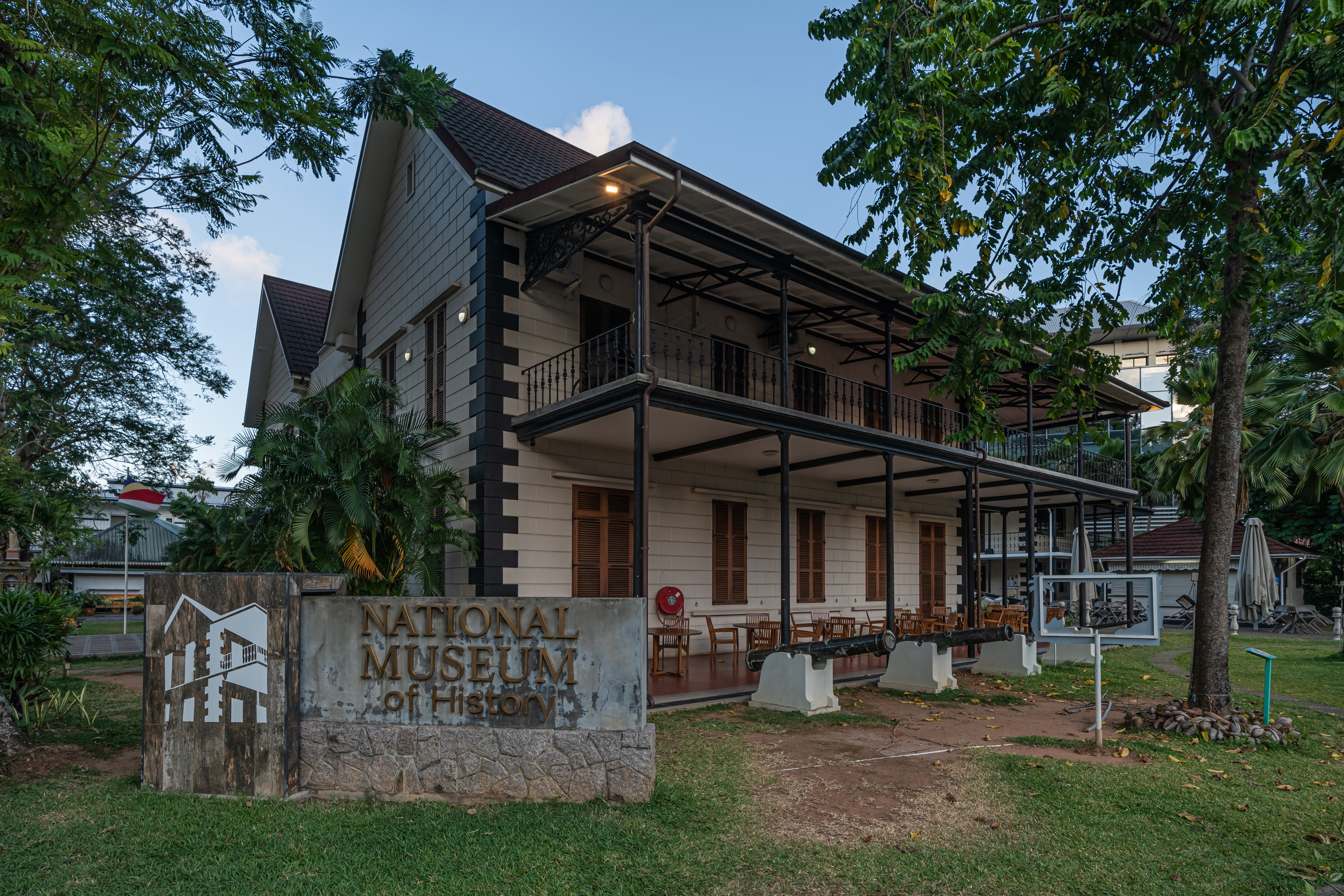
- Seychelles National Museum of History in Victoria, 2024
- Established: 1965
- Location: Victoria, Mahé, Seychelles
- Coordinates: 4.623405829588577°S 55.4525894984871°E
- Director: Beryl Ondiek

Seychelles National Museum of History is a museum in Victoria, Seychelles, dedicated to preserving and showcasing the country's cultural and historical heritage.

== History ==
Established in 1965, the museum originated from the National Archives at Carnegie Library, based on Captain Archibald T.W. Webb's personal collection. Initially a multipurpose hall, it housed natural history, history, and ethnology sections. In June 1994, the history and ethnology sections moved to a historic building on State House Avenue, built in 1902 by Sir Ernest Sweet Escott. After renovations funded by Barclays Bank, the museum officially opened on 17 June 1996.

Currently, the museum is located in the restored 1885 colonial-era Supreme Court building, reopened in 2018 by then-Seychelles president Danny Faure. The museum's ground floor explores 300 years of Seychelles history through model ships, cannons, and artefacts, while the upper floor dedicated to Creole culture, including clothing, music, and architecture.

== Galleries ==
The museum features several galleries and a temporary exhibition hall, including:

- Early Discovery to Crown Colony (915–1903)
- Crown Colony to Independence (1903–1976)
- Nationhood (1976–2018)
- Gift of State (Presidential Gifts)
- Creole Culture (Traditional Life)

== See also ==
- Seychelles Natural History Museum
