= Selwyn Selwyn-Clarke =

British doctor and politician; governor of the Seychelles

Sir Selwyn Selwyn-Clarke
- Born: 17 December 1893; North Finchley
- Died: 13 March 1976 (aged 82); Hampstead
- Occupation(s): Doctor, barrister
- Known for: Governor of the Seychelles
- Spouse: Hilda Selwyn-Clarke

Sir Percy Selwyn Selwyn-Clarke (Chinese: 司徒永覺, 17 December 1893 – 13 March 1976) was the Director of Medical Services, Hong Kong, from 1937 to 1943 and Governor of the Seychelles from 1947 to 1951.

== Biography ==
Sir Percy Selwyn Selwyn-Clarke was born in North Finchley on 17 December 1893 and educated at Bedales. He joined St Bartholomew's Hospital Medical School in 1912 and qualified in 1916.

Selwyn-Clarke served as a medical officer with two different units in France during the First World War. He was wounded twice and was awarded the Military Cross in 1918. He entered the Colonial Medical Service and was posted to the Gold Coast in 1919.

From 1937–1943, Selwyn-Clarke served as Hong Kong Director of Medical Services at the request of the incoming governor, Sir Geoffry Northcote. In 1942, Selwyn-Clarke went to the incoming Japanese military governor and secured permission to carry on as director of medical services, to work to preserve the lives and improve the health of thousands of prisoners of war, internees, and others by containing disease, improving sanitation, and working to prevent food-borne illnesses.

Early in 1943, two of Selwyn-Clarke's sponsors on the Japanese foreign office staff were posted away. At the same time, allied prisoner escapes were becoming more organized and successful. Fearing imminent arrest, he shared the details of his secret stores of medical supplies to two Chinese women helpers who continued his work successfully to the end of the war.

The Japanese arrested Selwyn-Clarke on 2 May 1943, and subjected him to 19 months of solitary confinement, which included 10 months of repeated tortures in an attempt to get him to confess to a list of 40 charges, including that he was the head of British espionage in Hong Kong. Though Selwyn-Clarke confessed to no charges, other tortured prisoners implicated him. Selwyn-Clarke was sentenced to death in a formal trial. The sentence was never carried out and the torture resumed.

Early in 1944, Selwyn-Clarke was moved to Stanley prison and given a second military trial. His sentence was reduced to three years and the capital charges against him were dropped. In December 1944 he was reprieved for reasons that remain debated.

Following his experiences in Hong Kong, Selwyn-Clarke served the British government as governor and commander-in-chief of the Seychelles for four years. In 1951 he returned to London and, for the five years until his retirement, resumed his career at the Ministry of Health. He remained active as an advocate for improved human conditions and medical and social advancement until his death in Hampstead on 13 March 1976.

== Family life ==
In 1935 Selwyn-Clarke married Hilda Browning, whom his associates characterized as a woman of strong social conscience and forward-looking ideas. Their daughter, Mary, was born in 1936 and accompanied them to Hong Kong. She went to study at Somerville College, Oxford. Selwyn-Clarke's wife became known as "Red Hilda" during the couple's time in Hong Kong. Though not officially employed, Hilda worked by Selwyn-Clarke's side to improve conditions, help people under her husband's care, and repeatedly make a new home for her family as they were uprooted and moved about.

At the time of Selwyn-Clarke's arrest, his wife and daughter were taken to Stanley Internment Camp on the Stanley Peninsula.

== Place names ==
The Nursing Quarters at Kwong Wah Hospital in Hong Kong was named after Selwyn-Clarke.

The main fruit and fish market in Victoria, Seychelles, a popular tourist attraction, is known as the Sir Selwyn Selwyn-Clarke Market.

== Sources ==
- The Hard Boiled Saint: Selwyn-Clarke in Hong Kong by Mervyn Horder, published in the British Medical Journal

Government offices
Preceded by William Marston Logan	Governor of the Seychelles; 1947–1951	Succeeded by Frederick Crawford
