= Hilda Selwyn-Clarke =

British socialist activist and politician

Lady Hilda Selwyn-Clarke
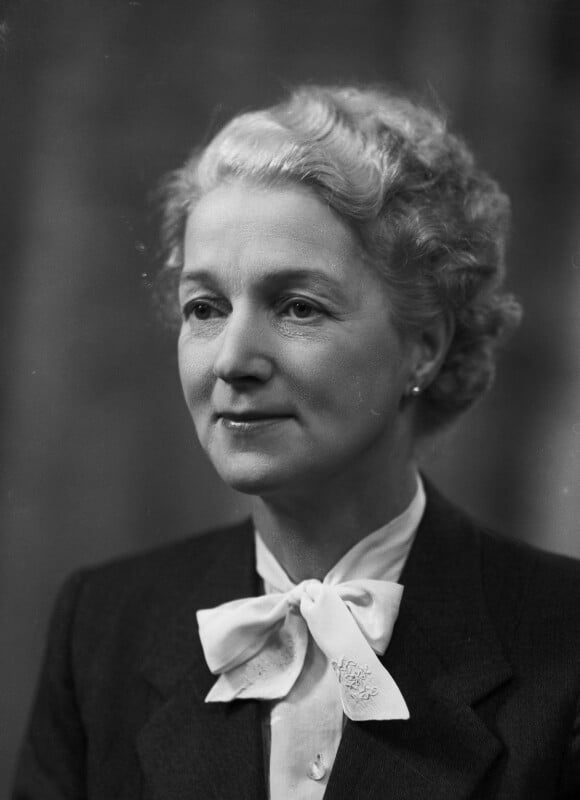
- Selwyn-Clarke in 1952
- Born: 1899
- Died: 1967 (aged 67–68)
- Education: Goldsmiths, University of London
- Occupation: Politician
- Political party: Labour Party
- Spouse: Selwyn Selwyn-Clarke

Lady Hilda Alice Selwyn-Clarke, née Browning, (1899-1967) was a British socialist activist.

Born in Sevenoaks as Hilda Alice Browning, she was educated on a scholarship at a local grammar school, then studied teaching at Goldsmiths College.

Selwyn-Clarke became active in the Independent Labour Party (ILP) and stood for it in Clapham at the 1931 general election. In 1934, she stood for the London County Council in Clapham against Bertram Mills, using the slogan "Bread not Circuses". In 1934, she wrote a pamphlet, "Women under fascism and communism", with Dora Fabian.

Selwyn-Clarke worked as an assistant to Fenner Brockway, then for the Society for Cultural Relations with the Soviet Union. Through this, she met Selwyn Selwyn-Clarke, and the two married in 1935. She went to live with her husband on postings in Ghana and Nigeria, and from February 1938 in Hong Kong, and brought up their daughter, Mary, who was born in 1936 and went to study at Somerville College, Oxford. During this time, Selwyn-Clarke was known by the nickname 'Red Hilda'. In Hong Kong, she chaired the local Eugenics League, which promoted the availability of birth control for working-class women, and was honorary secretary of the China Defence League, which raised funds for China in its war against Japan.

During World War II, Selwyn-Clarke worked at the War Memorial Hospital. Although her husband initially continued in his role under Japanese occupation, he was arrested on 2 May 1943; she and Mary were sent to the Stanley Internment Camp. Dr. Selwyn-Clarke refused to make any confession in spite of torture, and in December 1944, he was released from a prison sentence and the family was reunited at another camp. Dr. Selwyn-Clarke served as Governor of the Seychelles between 1947 and 1951.

Back in England, Selwyn-Clarke was elected to London County Council in 1952 as a Labour Party councillor in Fulham East, continuing as councillor for Fulham when the seats were redistributed until she stood down in 1965 due to poor health. She was also prominent in the Fabian Society, chairing its Colonial Bureau and working with the China Campaign Committee.

Non-profit organization positions
| Preceded by Marjorie Nicholson | Secretary of the Fabian Colonial Bureau; 1955–1961 | Succeeded by Margaret Roberts |
