= Eric Joyce (footballer) =

English footballer

Personal information
- Date of birth: 3 July 1924
- Place of birth: Durham, England
- Date of death: 1977 (aged 52–53)
- Place of death: Chester-le-Street, England
- Position: Wing half

Senior career*
Years	Team	Apps	(Gls)
- Eppleton CW
1946–1947	Bradford City	5	(0)
- Consett
Total		5	(0)
- * Club domestic league appearances and goals

Eric Joyce (3 July 1924 – 1977) was an English professional footballer who played as a wing half.

== Career ==
Born in Durham, Joyce played for Eppleton CW, Bradford City and Consett.
