= Day Joyce Sheet =

Artefact

Photograph courtesy of The Imperial War Museum, London.EPH3849

The Day Joyce Sheet is an artefact that emerged from the prison camps of the Second World War. Created secretly in Stanley Internment Camp, Hong Kong, the double bed sheet was embroidered and appliquéd with 1100 names, signs and figures and includes two years of camp diaries in code. It was successfully hidden during numerous searches of the camp and brought back to England at the end of the war. The needle Mrs. Joyce was using is still lodged in the sheet at the place where she broke off when the camp was liberated in 1945. In 1975 it was donated to the Imperial War Museum, London. In May 2009 the sheet was placed on public display for the first time, as part of a temporary exhibition at Imperial War Museum North entitled Captured: The Extraordinary Life of Prisoners of War. While the sheet's size and fragility prevent it from being put on permanent display, it can be seen in the Exhibits and Firearms Department by prior appointment.

Most of the available information about the Day Joyce Sheet come from Day Joyce's own memoirs and the works of historian Bernice Archer who researched the history of civilian internment during the Pacific War.

== Early life of Day Joyce (née Sage) ==
Day Joyce was born Daisy Mary Sage on 12 November 1905 in Yoxford, Suffolk. Before the Second World War, Day (as she was called for short) had completed a degree in biology and when war was declared she also trained as an auxiliary nurse. Bored with waiting to be called up for service for the Second World War in Europe, in March 1940 she accepted a job as a biologist for the Hong Kong Education Department. It was while she was working in this post in Hong Kong that the Japanese attacked on 7 December 1941.

During the battle she joined other auxiliary nurses in La Salle College, a Catholic boys' school in Kowloon City that was commandeered as an emergency hospital for the war effort. Shortly before Hong Kong surrendered to the Japanese on 25 December 1941, the Japanese took over the hospital. Day and other nurses remained in La Salle College until 20 January 1942 when they were interned with the approximately 2,000 other Western civilian men, women and children in the bomb-scarred prison warders quarters of Stanley Prison on the south eastern peninsula of Hong Kong Island. Stanley is in the neck of the peninsular and, as Day wrote in her memoirs, it was "a relatively easy place in which to make a cage with the sea to reinforce the bars."

== Creation of the sheet ==
Throughout the war Day kept a diary on loose sheets of paper and embroidered the sheet. The loose leaves of the diary she hid in a pair of Chinese pyjamas. "What was of prime importance of the pyjamas was their creaking and their crackling. For three years they were to contain in their noisy folds all my written pages and to keep them safe through exciting searches"

The sheet, approximately 8ft x 7ft (2.5m x 2m), was "looted" at the outset of the war and was "born" in La Salle emergency hospital. Having managed to get "a needle from somewhere" she pulled some threads out of the hospital linen and started sewing her thoughts. "It was not begun with any purpose consciously in mind, nor was it continued with any 'after-the-war' ideas. It was simply a hand steadying, mind employing, secret thought recorder of my own" (p. 36).

When not being embroidered the sheet was kept, undetected, between the rugs on her camp bed. By the time Day was liberated, the sheet had accumulated 1100 names, signs and symbols, including two years of camp diaries in coded words and the signatures of "so many men, women and children, and of heroic people who will not come home." "To say it is code," Day wrote, "is making a very simple idea sound far too grand, but it is true in so far as I hoped what I was doing was not too obvious. To an enemy enquirer I was just learning better English" (p. 100).

== Later life and legacy ==
Day survived the war and was repatriated in August/September 1945. On her way home to England she was so ill she was put into hospital in Colombo. While there some friends, Willoughby G. Beauchamp and his wife Kathleen Beauchamp, found her and took her to their home in Colombo to recuperate. Arriving at Lyneham RAF base in Wiltshire some time later, she and others were taken by coach "smoothly on that Autumn morning, through the chokingly emotive beauty of the English countryside to Victoria Station, London. Nobody that I knew was there. I sat on my Hong Kong basket and cried" (p. 270).

Day never recovered fully enough to return to Hong Kong. She spent some time in Norway to recuperate further and, on her return, she took a job as a warden at Sheffield University. While in Sheffield she met and married bullion merchant Eric Joyce.

In the early 1970s, when "enough time had elapsed for the fierce agonies of remembrance to be controlled and for the worthwhile, interesting core of the business to remain in the memory" (p. 1), she began to write. Assisted by her loose leaf diary, which she claimed was "sadder than memory," and the sheet, she wrote her memoirs of her time in Hong Kong during the war. In 1975 she donated the memoirs and the sheet to the Imperial War Museum, London where they have remained ever since. Mrs. Daisy Mary Joyce, pre-deceased by her husband, died of cancer on 19 October 1975.

Six decades after the sheet's creation, the meanings of the coloured patches of materials, the signatures, the various symbols and the different coloured threads lovingly chain stitched on this "gay and colourful, not very beautiful, much stained" sheet were decoded using Day's memoirs as a key (p. 2). In the process, this apparently placid and randomly embroidered sheet reveals Day's secret thoughts and a record of the "horrors, points of light and peaks of hope...the big things and little things, important things and silly things" in the lives of the internees in Stanley Camp Hong Kong during the Second World War (p. 2 and 105).

== Imperial War Museum holdings ==
The Day Joyce Sheet, ID no. EPH 3849, is held in the Exhibits and Firearms Department of the Imperial War Museum. It can currently (August 2023) be seen as part of the ‘Second World War – Witnesses to War’ terrace display gallery. When not on display, it can be seen by prior appointment. The Guide to the Day Joyce Sheet by Dr. Bernice Archer is available at the department.

Mrs. Joyce's memoir, Ordinary People: The Sheet, ID no. P324, is also held by the Imperial War Museum. It can be seen by prior appointment at the Department of Documents Reading Room.

A recording of Mrs. Joyce describing the sheet and explaining some of its features, ID no. 16065/2, is held in the Museum's Sound Archive. It can be heard by prior appointment in their Reading Room; copies are available for purchase.

== Bibliography ==
Most of the secondary sources on the Day Joyce Sheet were written by Bernice Archer, who extensively researched the experiences of interned civilians under Japanese occupation during the Pacific War. Published works include:

- Bernice Archer (2004): The Internment of Western Civilians under the Japanese, 1941-1945: A Patchwork of Internment. Routledge, 2004. ISBN 0-7146-5592-9. This book is a comparative study of the experiences of civilians in mixed family camps and sexually segregated camps in the Far East, combining a wide variety of conventional and unconventional source material.
- Bernice Archer, Kent Fedorowich (2006): The Women of Stanley. In: Women's History Review, Volume 5, Number 3, doi:10.1080/09612029600200119. This article examines the experiences of some of the women in Stanley Internment Camp, Hong Kong, analysing their roles and contributions to camp life.
- Bernice Archer (2008), Internee voices: Women and children's experience of being Japanese captives. In: Kevin Blackburn and Karl Hack (eds,) Forgotten Captives in Japanese Occupied Asia, (London & New York, Routledge, 2008), pp. 224-242.
