= English River, Seychelles =

Coordinates: 4°35′S 55°27′E

English River
- District

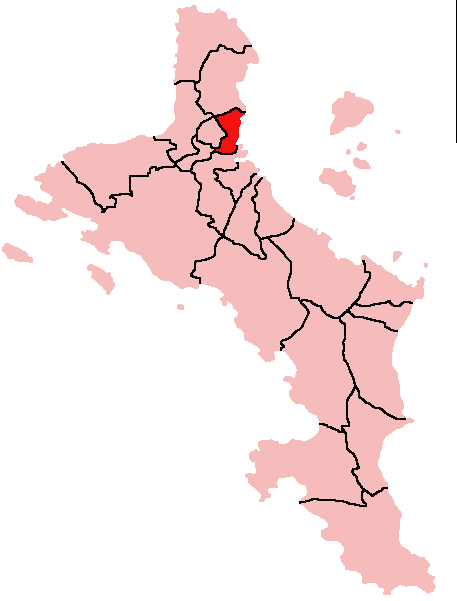
- Location within Mahé Island, Seychelles
- Country: Seychelles

Government
  - District Administrator: Nicole Gabriele
  - Member of National Assembly: Hon. Wilbert Herminie (PL)

Population (2019 Estimate)
  - Total: 3,737
- Time zone: Seychelles Time

English River (French: La Rivière Anglaise, French pronunciation: [la ʁivjɛʁ ɑ̃ɡlɛz]) is an administrative district of Seychelles on the island of Mahé.
