= Renewable energy in Seychelles =

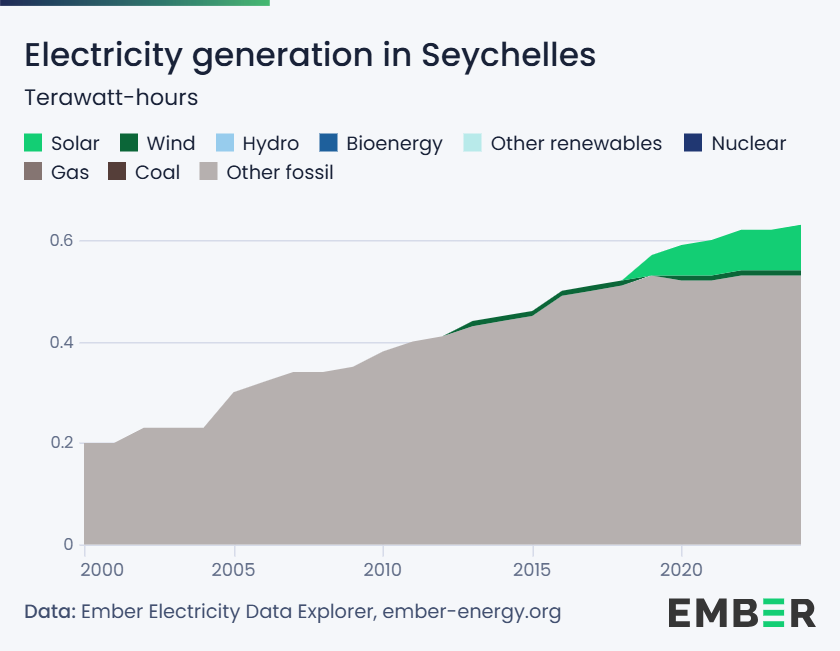
Electricity generation in Seychelles in terawatt-hours

Renewable energy in Seychelles is a recent development in providing power to the country. Electricity for the island nation of Seychelles is primarily produced by diesel generators which must import their fuel (69 MW on Mahe and 12 MW on Praslin). Energy policy calls for 15% renewables by 2030. In June 2013, the first wind farm in Seychelles was officially inaugurated. This 6 MW power plant can produce up to 2% of the Seychelles' power and is located on Mahé Island. It is expected that the wind farm will replace 1.6 million litres of diesel fuel annually. The wind farm is expected to generate 7 GWh of electricity and the islands consume 350 GWh of electricity per year. The project was developed by Masdar of Abu Dhabi. Unison of South Korea manufactured and installed the wind farm, with a 2-year maintenance contract upon commissioning.

Electricity production is expected to be highly seasonal with the majority of energy produced in the months of June to September when wind strength and wind probability are highest on the island of Mahe.

Project Development

The wind farm project was fully funded by the Abu Dhabi government through a $28 Million grant to the Seychelles. The Abu Dhabi government appointed Masdar as project manager.

The wind farm was originally envisaged to be commissioned by November 2012 however this suffered several delays. The commissioning date was moved to February 2013 but just three of the eight turbines were commissioned by this date. The farm was finally fully commissioned 8 months later than first planned in June 2013.

The wind farm operator, the state owned Public Utilities Corporation (PUC), confirmed on 25 July 2013 that one of the turbines was out of operation due to an overheating transformer. This followed weeks of speculation on local social media networks that one of the turbines was not in operation. The PUC also confirmed that the farm had produced 2.4 GWh of electricity during 2013 up to 25 July 2013, approximately halfway through the windy season. Energy production from the wind farm is therefore expected to be below projections in 2013.
